= Ivor Abrahams =

English sculptor and print maker (1935–2015)

Ivor Abrahams RA
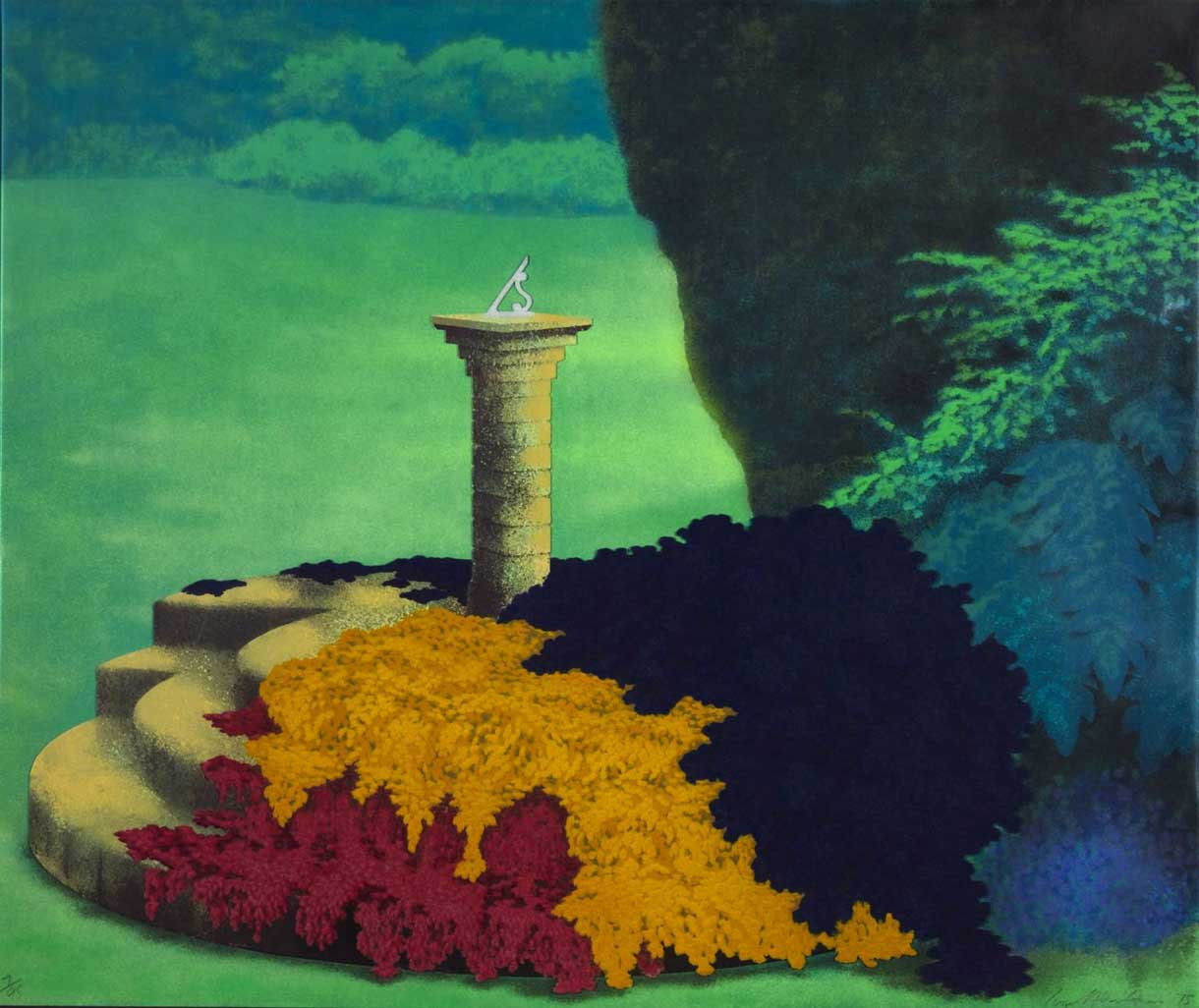
- Sundial Summer, 1975, Tate Gallery
- Born: Ivor Abrahams; 10 January 1935; Wigan, Lancashire, England
- Died: 6 January 2015 (aged 79); Ramsgate, Kent, England
- Education: Saint Martin's School of Art, 1952–1954; Camberwell School of Art, 1954–1957
- Occupations: Sculptor, ceramicist and print maker
- Known for: Sculpture, printmaking
- Awards: Royal Academician, 1989; Winston Churchill Travelling Fellowship, 1988

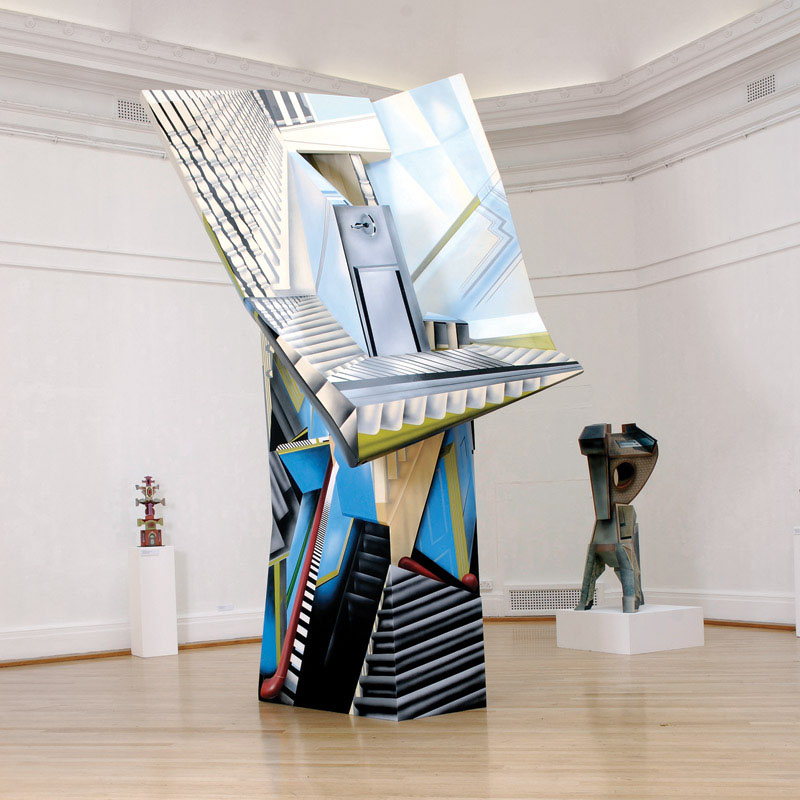
Head of the stairs, 2001

Ivor Abrahams RA (10 January 1935 – 6 January 2015) was a British sculptor, ceramicist and print maker best known for his polychrome sculptures and his stylised prints of garden scenes. His career-long exploration of new subject matter, novel techniques and materials made his art dealer, James Mayor, describe him as Europe's equivalent of Robert Rauschenberg.

== Early life ==
Ivor Abrahams was born 10 January 1935 in Wigan, Lancashire, to a Jewish family, the eldest of two children. Both parents were born in Manchester area – Ray (Rachael) née Kalisky / Kay and Harry (Hyman) Abrahams – but all four grandparents came from eastern Europe. He studied sculpture at Saint Martin's School of Art under Frank Martin and Anthony Caro 1952–54, and Camberwell School of Art under Karel Vogel and Martin Bloch 1954–57. In 1957, Abrahams became apprentice to the Fiorini Bronze Foundry, and went on to work as a display artist for Adel Rootstein.

== Work ==
His first show, in 1960, was at the Portal Gallery with Peter Blake. Through Eduardo Paolozzi, Abrahams was included in the landmark 1961 ICA exhibition 26 Young Sculptors, together with Phillip King and Maurice Agis, friends from the St Martin's days.

By the late 1960s, Abrahams had found inspiration in the imagery of domestic gardens. As well as bronze, he started using new material for his work, nylon flocking, pre-vulcanized latex, styrene and plastics. After a solo show at the Richard Feigen Gallery in New York in 1970, he established his international reputation with a major museum show at the Kolnisher Kunstverein Cologne in 1973. In 1975, he met James Mayor, who invited him to show the following year at the Mayor Gallery, thus beginning an association that continued till his death.

Abrahams' print output includes his garden series and suites celebrating Edmund Burke and Edgar Allan Poe showcased in a Royal Academy exhibition in 2010. His body of prints was published by Bernard Jacobson who regularly exhibited his work in London and the US. In 1982, Bryan Robertson organised an exhibition of the sculptures at the Warwick Arts Trust. and in 1984 he was invited to mount his first sculpture retrospective at the Yorkshire Sculpture Park.

Abrahams' post-Cubist architectural structures of the 1990s resulted in a commission by the Goodwood Sculpture Park and the purchase of the bronze Head of the Stairs by the Royal Borough of Kensington & Chelsea.

In the 2000s, a series of owls and cockerels, using various media, including enamel on steel epoxy resin and decal, culminated in the 2005 Mayor Gallery exhibition A Parliament of Owls. A mini-retrospective entitled The Four Seasons of Ivor Abrahams was held in 2007 at One Canada Square in Canary Wharf. In 2008, the Henry Moore Institute mounted an exhibition of early work untitled By Leafy Ways showing the 1972 film of the same name, which prompted a reintroduction of the Garden image. In 2012, a retrospective at the Royal West of England Academy was accompanied by an Andrew Lambirth monograph: Eden and Other Suburbs, the Life and Work of Ivor Abrahams.

== Selected public collections ==
- Aberdeen Art Gallery
- Arts Council of Great Britain
- Fitzwilliam Museum, Cambridge
- Leeds Art Gallery
- Royal Academy of Arts
- Tate Gallery, London
- Victoria and Albert Museum, London
- Metropolitan Museum of Art, New York
- Museum of Modern Art, New York

== Sources ==
- Huntington-Whiteley, James (2019). "Ivor Abrahams". Oxford Dictionary of National Biography (online ed.). OUP. doi:10.1093/ref:odnb/109052. (Subscription, Wikipedia Library access or UK public library membership required.)
- Lambirth, Andrew (2012a). Eden and Other Suburbs - The Life and Work of Sculptor Ivor Abrahams. Sansom. ISBN 978-1906593810.
- Lambirth, Andrew (11 February 2012b). "Memorable imagery". The Spectator. Archived from the original on 5 March 2016.
- A Dictionary of Modern and Contemporary Art (2 ed.). OUP. 2009. ISBN 978-0199239665.
- Rubinstein, William D; Jolles, Michael; Rubinstein, Hilary L (2011). The Palgrave Dictionary of Anglo-Jewish History. Palgrave Macmillan. ISBN 978-1403939104.
- Sinclair, Clive (1994). Clive Sinclair on Ivor Abrahams. Modern British Masters. Vol. X. Bernard Jacobson. ISBN 978-1872784175.
- McEwen, John (1 February 2015). "Ivor Abrahams: Maverick artist". The Independent. Archived from the original on 4 March 2016.
- "Ivor Abrahams, artist – obituary". The Telegraph. 19 January 2015. Archived from the original on 19 January 2015.
