= Australian Jewish Genealogical Society =

Australian non-profit organisation

The Australian Jewish Genealogical Society (AJGS) is an Australian non-profit organisation established to encourage and assist those with Jewish ancestry to research their family histories. It is dedicated to the collection, preservation and dissemination of genealogical information of particular relevance and interest to members of the Australian Jewish community.

The Society was established in Sydney in 1993. A Victorian branch was established in 1995, which incorporated in 1998. The Sydney Society represents member researchers in the Australian Capital Territory, New South Wales, South Australia and Western Australia. There are several members in Canberra, some of whom are members of the ACT Jewish community.

The Sydney Society maintains library resources of Jewish genealogically relevant reference books, maps, newsletters, and journals, and has since 1993 produced a quarterly magazine called The Kosher Koala.

The Australian Jewish Genealogical Society (Victoria), Inc. and the Australian Jewish Genealogical Society, Inc. are affiliated to the International Association of Jewish Genealogical Societies (IAJGS), which comprises over 80 national Jewish genealogical societies.

== Australian Jewish Genealogical Society (Victoria), Inc ==
A Victorian branch of the Society was established in 1995, and incorporated as a separate association in 1998 as the Australian Jewish Genealogical Society (Victoria), Inc. It presently has about 150 members.

The Victorian library collection (which includes material belonging to the Australian Jewish Historical Society) is housed at the Makor Jewish Community Library, which is part of the Lamm Jewish Library of Australia. It also provides online and personal information as to where various types of lists are available and holds seminars and other educational events. The Victorian Society has since February 1999 produced a quarterly newsletter called Jewish Genealogy Downunder.

== See also ==
- History of the Jews in Australia
- Australian Jewish Historical Society
- Australian Association for Jewish Studies
- Jewish Museum of Australia
