= Suzanne Rutland =

Australian university teacher

Suzanne Dorothy Rutland
- Born: 1946 (age 79–80)

Academic work
- Discipline: History, Jewish Studies
- Institutions: University of Sydney
- Main interests: History of Australian Jewry
- Notable works: Edge of the Diaspora (1988)

Suzanne Dorothy Rutland OAM (born 1946 in Sydney) is an Australian-Jewish historian. Rutland serves as Professor Emerita at the University of Sydney. She was previously Chair of the Department of Hebrew, Biblical and Jewish Studies, at Sydney University's Faculty of Arts and Social Sciences, serving in that position for 11 years. She specializes in the history of Australian Jews and religious education.

== Overview ==
Rutland received her B.A. (Hons), M.A. (Hons), and Ph.D. from the University of Sydney. She also received a Diploma in Education from Sydney Teachers College. She was the president of the Australian Association for Jewish Studies and is a recipient of the Medal of the Order of Australia for "service to Jewish education and history through a range of higher education development roles and as an author and academic, and to the promotion of interfaith relations".

Rutland's work Edge of the Diaspora: Two Centuries of Jewish Settlement in Australia was first published in 1988 with further editions in 1997 and 2001. Her work The Jews in Australia was published by Cambridge University Press in 2005. Her book co-written with journalist Sam Lipski, Let My People Go: The Untold Story of Australia and Soviet Jews, 1959-1989, Melbourne: Hybrid Publishers was published in 2015 and in 2016 was joint-winner of Australian Prime Minister's Literary Award (Australian History).

She has held numerous leadership positions, including president of the Australian Jewish Historical Society and Sydney editor of its journal since 1991, as well as serving on its committee. She has been actively involved with the Australian Association of Jewish Studies, has served as its president and been the convenor of a number of its conferences. She is currently a committee member and, as a past president, very actively involved. She is also a Board Member of the Freilich Project, ANU, Honorary Secretary of the University of Sydney Association of Professors’ and a member of Australia's expert delegation of the International Holocaust Remembrance Alliance, on its Education Working Group, as well as being involved with other Jewish community organisations.

== Research ==
- History of the Jews in Australia
- Australian Jewry
- The Holocaust and Dutch Jewry
- Jewish Education in Australia
- Modern Israel

=== Lessons ===
- Jewish civilization, thought and culture
- The Australian Jewish Experience
- The evolution of Judaism in the New World
- Jerusalem: From Rome to Islam

== Publications (selection) ==
- Rutland, Suzanne D. Lone Voice: The Wars of Isi Leibler, Jerusalem: Gefen Books; Melbourne: Hybrid Publishing, 2021.
- Gross, Zehavit and Rutland, Suzanne, ‘Special Religious Education in Australia and its Value to Contemporary Society, Springer International Publishing, 2021.
- Lipski, Sam and Rutland, Suzanne D. Let My People Go: the Untold Story of Australia and Soviet Jews, 1959-1989, Melbourne: Hybrid Publishers, 2015.
- Edge of the Diaspora: Two Centuries of Jewish Settlement in Australia, American edition :, New York: Holmes & Meier, 2001, i - xv, 479th.
- With One Voice: the History of the New South Wales Jewish Board of Deputies Sydney, Australian Jewish Historical Society, 1998, Ix, 405 (with co-author).
- If you will it, it is no dream: The Moriah Story, Sydney: Play Right Publishing., 2003.
- Jewish Life Down Under: The Flowering of Australian Jewry, Jerusalem, Institute of the World Jewish Congress, Policy Study No. 21, 2001, the 39th.

For a full list of publications see Professor Susanne Rutland, Sydney University.

=== Australian Journal of Jewish Studies ===
- Rutland, Suzanne D. "Book review: Gabrielle Gouch's Once, Only the Swallows were Free." Australian Journal of Jewish Studies Volume XXVII (p. 157). Australian Association for Jewish Studies. 2013.
- Rutland, Suzanne D. "Whitlam's Shifts in Foreign Policy 1972-1975: Israel and Soviet Jewry." Australian Journal of Jewish Studies Volume XXVI (p. 36). Australian Association for Jewish Studies. 2012.
- Rutland, Suzanne D. and Sol Encel. "Major Issues Facing the Jewish Community: Women's Perceptions." Australian Journal of Jewish Studies Volume XX (p. 169). Australian Association for Jewish Studies. 2006.
- Rutland, Suzanne D. "1948 and the Creation of the State of Israel: A Watershed Period for Australian Zionism." Australian Journal of Jewish Studies Volume XVIII (p. 97). Australian Association for Jewish Studies. 2004.
- Rutland, Suzanne D. "Postwar Jewish 'Boat People' and Parallels with the Tampa Incident." Australian Journal of Jewish Studies Volume XVI (p. 159). Australian Association for Jewish Studies. 2002.
- Rutland, Suzanne D. "The State of Jewish Education in Australia's Jewish Day Schools." Australian Journal of Jewish Studies Volume XIV (p. 78). Australian Association for Jewish Studies. 2000.
- Rutland, Suzanne D. "'Our Children Will Be Our Guarantors': Child Survivors in Australia." Australian Journal of Jewish Studies Volume VIII, Number 1 (p. 74). Australian Association for Jewish Studies. 1994.
- Rutland, Suzanne D. "'Are You Jewish?' Postwar Jewish Immigration to Australia, 1945-1954." Australian Journal of Jewish Studies Volume V, Number 2, (p. 35). Australian Association for Jewish Studies. 1991.
- Rubinstein, W. D., Paul Bartrop and Suzanne D. Rutland. "The Future of Australian Jewish Historiography: A Panel Discussion." Australian Journal of Jewish Studies Vol. 0 No. 0 Volume 3, No. 1, Issue 4 (p. 29). Australian Association for Jewish Studies. July 1989.
- Rutland, Suzanne D. "Australia and Refugee Migration, 1933-1945: Consensus or Conflict." Australian Journal of Jewish Studies Volume 2, No. 2, Issue 3 (p. 77). Australian Association for Jewish Studies. December, 1988.

== See also ==
- History of the Jews in Australia
