= Victorian Jewish War Memorial =

Coordinates: 37°52′35″S 144°59′41″E

The Victorian Jewish War Memorial (also referred to as the Ripponlea obelisk) is located at Burnett Grey Gardens on Morres Street in the Melbourne suburb of Ripponlea. The memorial dedicated to Victorian Jewish soldiers who served in the first and second World Wars, as well as in other conflicts. The monument was unveiled on 15 November 2015. The reason for the building of the monument was to accommodate veterans who wished to visit a local memorial.

The Jewish war memorial originally incorrectly stated that World War II began in 1938 instead of 1939. The organisation behind the memorial, Victorian Association of Jewish Ex & Servicemen & Women Australia (VAJEX), deliberately chose 1938 to acknowledge Kristallnacht, which they viewed as the beginning of Jewish persecution leading to the Holocaust. Critics, including the Australian Jewish Historical Society and MP Michael Danby, argued this distorts history, since World War II officially began with Germany's invasion of Poland in September 1939. VAJEX has acknowledged the historical fact and stated they would add a clarifying plaque explaining the reasoning behind the date.

According to VAJEX, major funders for the memorial included the Pratt Foundation and Marcus Besen. The site was offered by Heritage Victoria.
