= Miriam Fink =

Australian Jewish community leader

- Born: 5 December 1913; Białystok
- Died: 2 May 1990 (aged 76); Prahran, Victoria, Australia
- Occupations: community leader, activist, philanthropist
- Notable work: Awarded Member of the Order of the British Empire in recognition of service to Jewish women

Miriam (Mina) Fink (5 December 1913 – 2 May 1990) was an Australian social activist and charity worker of Polish-Jewish origin. She was actively involved in the establishment of Melbourne's Jewish Holocaust Museum and Research Centre and awarded a Member of the Order of the British Empire in recognition of her service to Jewish women.

== Biography ==
Miriam Waks was born in Bialystok on 5 December 1913 the second child of merchant Nathan Waks and his wife Freda (née Kaplan). In 1921, Miriam, along with her brothers Leon and Jacek, became orphans after their father died in a typhus epidemic and their mother committed suicide. She attended Dawid Druskin 's junior high school, where she obtained her high school diploma. In 1932, she met businessman Leo Fink who was visiting Bialystok. On 20 September 1932 they got married and soon after the wedding they emigrated to Australia. They had two children, a son and a daughter.

During World War II, Fink actively participated in helping the victims of the Holocaust. In 1943 she was elected as director of the United Jewish Overseas Relief Fund (UJORF). In 1945-47 she was the president of the women's section of this organization. She coordinated fundraising and the shipment of material aid packages. UJORF founded seven shelters for post-war emigrants in Melbourne, helping them in the first phase of their stay in Australia. Fink personally welcomed new immigrants to Port Melbourne, and was also responsible for the day-to-day running of hostels and the Jewish landsmanshaft Bialystoker Center. Fink "adopted" a group of children later known unofficially as the Buchenwald boys, many of whom had previously been in concentration camps, helping them with resettlement, education, and employment.

In the years 1947-1976 Fink was a board member of the successor of UJORF - the Australian Jewish Welfare and Relief Society (AJWRS). In the years 1957-60 she was the first European-born woman to become president of the Victorian section of this organization. As part of her work at AJWRS, she emphasized the independent work of women in the organization, and not only as additional help for men. After being elected president of AJWRS (1967–73), she developed an ambitious fundraising program for local Jewish and non-Jewish communities and for aid in Israel. She participated in conferences of the International Council of Jewish Women (1954, 1963, 1966, 1969), was president of the ICJW Melbourne Conference (1975).

In 1974 she was awarded the Member of the Order of the British Empire in recognition of her service to Jewish women.

== Death and legacy ==
Fink actively participated in the creation of the Jewish Holocaust Museum and Research Centre, which opened in Melbourne in 1984. She was a member of the centre's original organising committee and together with her husband Leo, she established the Leo and Mina Fink Fund, which enabled the purchase of the Centre's building.

Fink died in Prahran in Melbourne on 2 May 1990. She was buried in the Chevra Kadisha Cemetery in Springvale.

After her death the National Council of Jewish Women established a leadership development fund in her honour.

== See also ==
- Judaism in Australia
