= Melbourne Holocaust Museum =

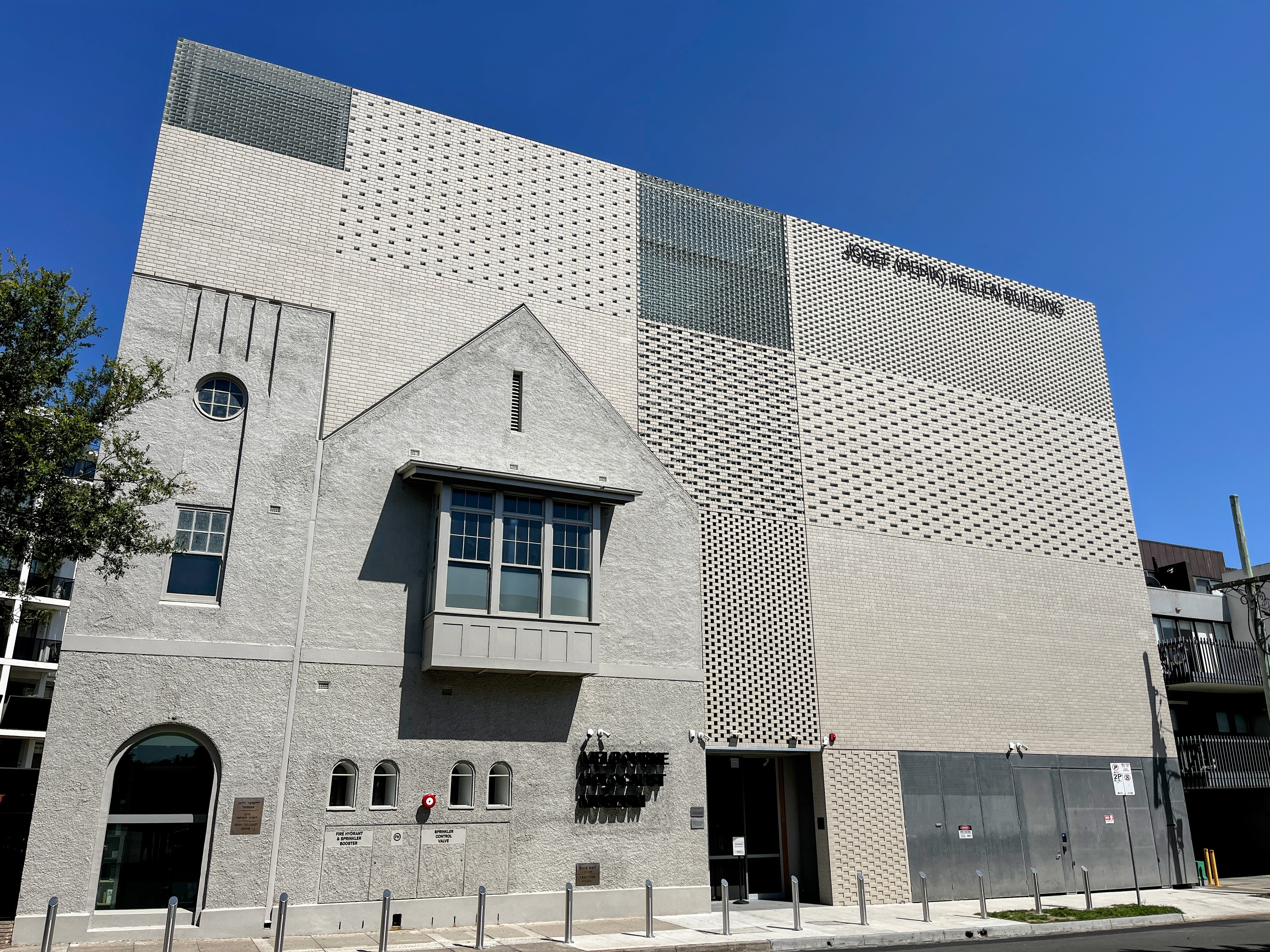
- Former name: Jewish Holocaust Centre
- Established: March 4, 1984
- Location: 13 Selwyn St, Elsternwick, Melbourne, Australia
- Coordinates: 37.8834°S 145.0011°E
- Type: Holocaust museum
- Founders: Symcha Binem Wiener; Miriam Fink; Abram Goldberg; Aron Sokolowicz
- Presidents: Sue Hampel; Michael Debinski
- Website: https://mhm.org.au/

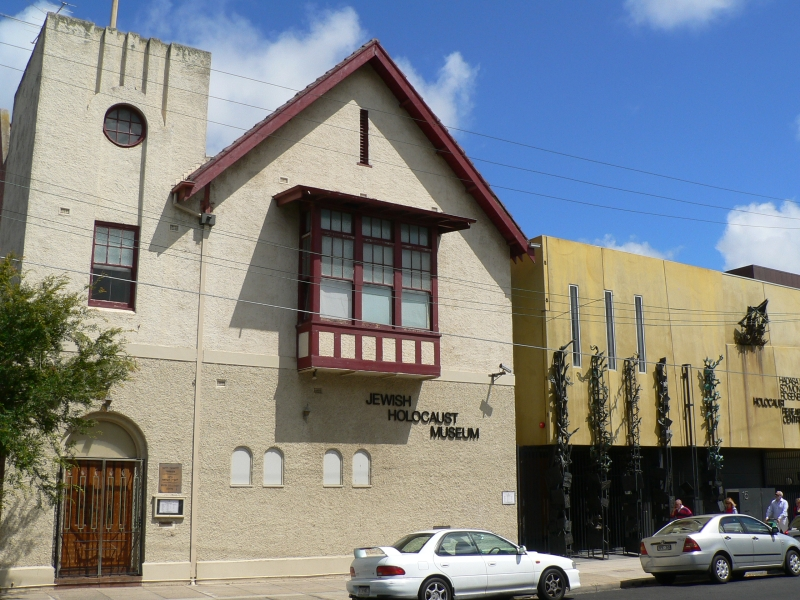
Jewish Holocaust Centre (original building)

The Melbourne Holocaust Museum (MHM) (formerly known as the Jewish Holocaust Centre) is an Australian institution dedicated to Holocaust education, research, and remembrance, based in Melbourne. It was founded in Elsternwick, Melbourne, in 1984 by Holocaust survivors. Its mission is to commemorate the six million Jews murdered by the Nazis between 1933 and 1945, and amplify the voices of Holocaust survivors, to inspire a better future free from antisemitism, racism and prejudice. The museum focuses on educating younger generations against hate, with tens of thousands of students visiting the museum every year to participate in MHM's age-appropriate education programs.

== History ==
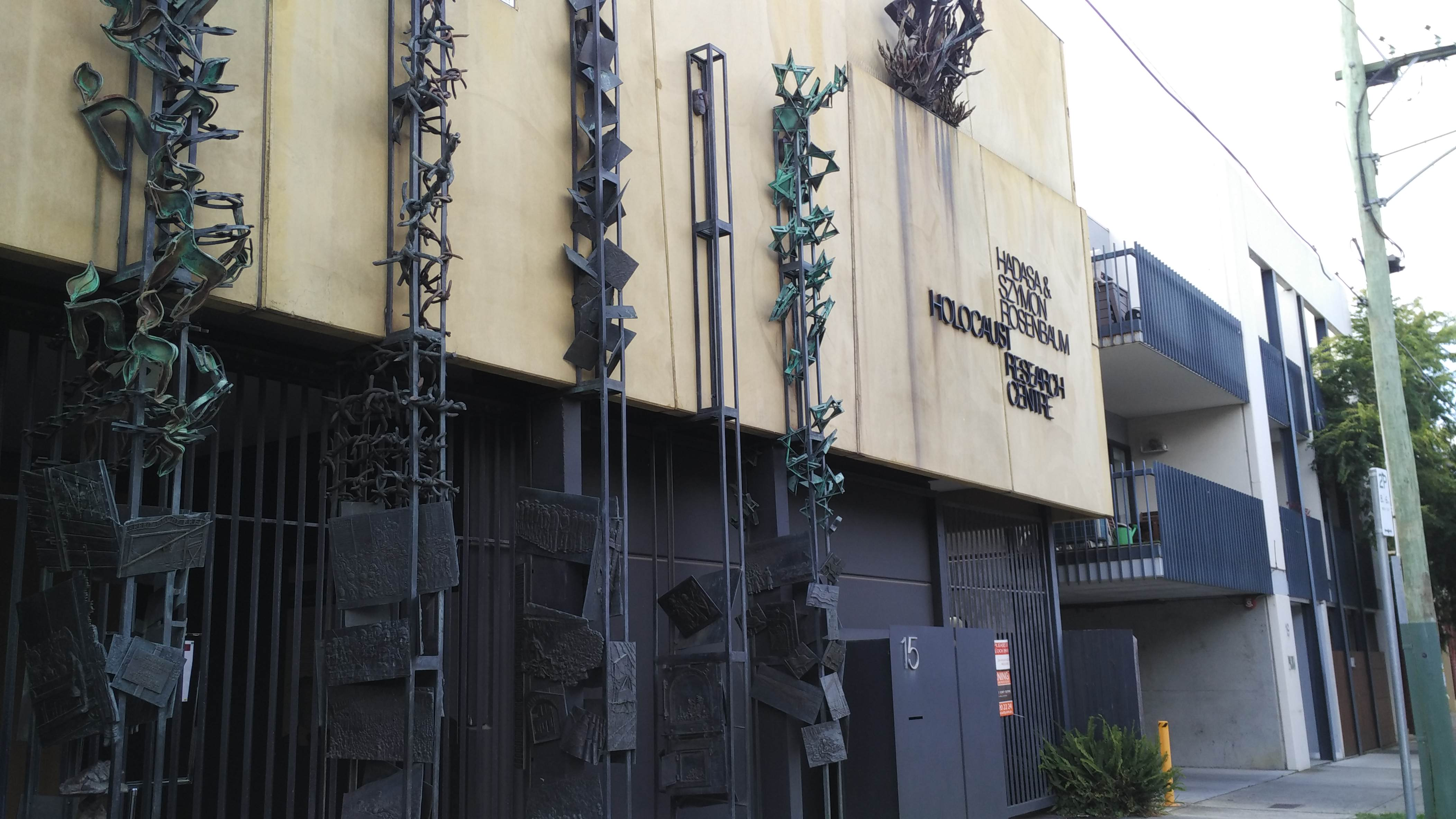
Jewish Holocaust Centre (former entrance)

The Melbourne Holocaust Museum was founded in 1984 by Holocaust survivors. The museum was founded without significant public or private funds and has had to rely on support from Holocaust survivors, their relatives, volunteers, and philanthropists.

Holocaust survivor Abram Goldberg (1924-2025) was a founding member of the museum. He told many visitors his story at the museum, before his death in September 2025, aged 100. He migrated from Poland to Australia in 1951. In 2013 he was awarded an Order of Australia Medal, in recognition of his long service dedicated to the museum, and to Jewish culture. His 314-page memoir, The Strength of Hope, was published in 2022.

Miriam Fink was a member of the centre's original organising committee and together with her husband Leo, she established the Leo and Mina Fink Fund, which enabled the purchase of the Centre's building.

In early 1994 Pauline Rockman joined the museum as a volunteer in the testimonies department, which was responsible for interviewing Holocaust survivors and recording their stories for posterity. After a couple of years, she became Australian regional coordinator for the Shoah Foundation, for which she collected more testimonies, over 17 years. She became MHM co-president in 2006.

The museum closed to the public in 2020 to undergo a major redevelopment project with Kerstin Thompson Architects. The original heritage building, built in the 1920s, was retained and integrated with a new facade. The expansion created spaces for research, education, and administration. In April 2023, ahead of the anticipated reopening, the name was updated to the Melbourne Holocaust Museum, with a fresh logo. The project won the 2023 National Award for Public Architecture.

In August 2023, Pauline Rockman, who had shared the presidency with Sue Hampel (or Hempel in some sources), stepped down from her role. Hempel stayed on and was joined by Michael Debinski, who had been vice-president since 2021.

In November 2023 the refurbished museum officially reopened to the public.

In February 2025 a new initiative called "Journeys of Hope" was created by ABC Education working in partnership with MHM. The project comprises five short films of interviews with Holocaust survivors who came to Australia as children, ending with a message of hope. There is also a set of classroom activities linked to the Australian Curriculum.

== Description and activities ==
As of 2025 Sue Hampel and Michael Debinski are presidents of the museum. Dr Breann Fallon is CEO.

The museum has two permanent exhibition spaces, a gallery for temporary exhibitions, a virtual reality documentary experience, a memorial room, two auditoriums and four classrooms. Apart from guided tours through the museum, the MHM offers adult education programs, teacher training and also hosts a range of events which are open to the public.

The museum holds a collection of over 1300 survivor video testimonials and over 12,000 historical artefacts, including documents, photos, artworks and objects from the Holocaust and immediate-post Holocaust era.

The museum features a reinstallation of the Pillars of Witness sculpture by Andrew Rogers.

== Exhibitions ==
The permanent exhibition titled Everybody Had a Name follows the chronology of the Holocaust, beginning with pre-war Jewish life, and closing with how local survivors rebuilt their lives in Melbourne after the war.

The exhibition Hidden: Seven Children Saved is an immersive audio-visual exhibition designed for younger audiences (10+). It follows the journey of seven children who were in hiding during the Holocaust.

== Austrian volunteers ==
Austrian volunteers, under a programme called Austrian Service Abroad, are able to work for 10–12 months in the MHM alternatively to compulsory military service or civilian service in Austria. Their work includes, among other things, the translation of documents, the preparation of exhibitions, working in the library and cataloguing of photographs.

== See also ==
- Adelaide Holocaust Museum and Andrew Steiner Education Centre
- Jewish Museum of Australia
- Sydney Jewish Museum
- Australian Association for Jewish Studies
