= History of the Jews in Australia =

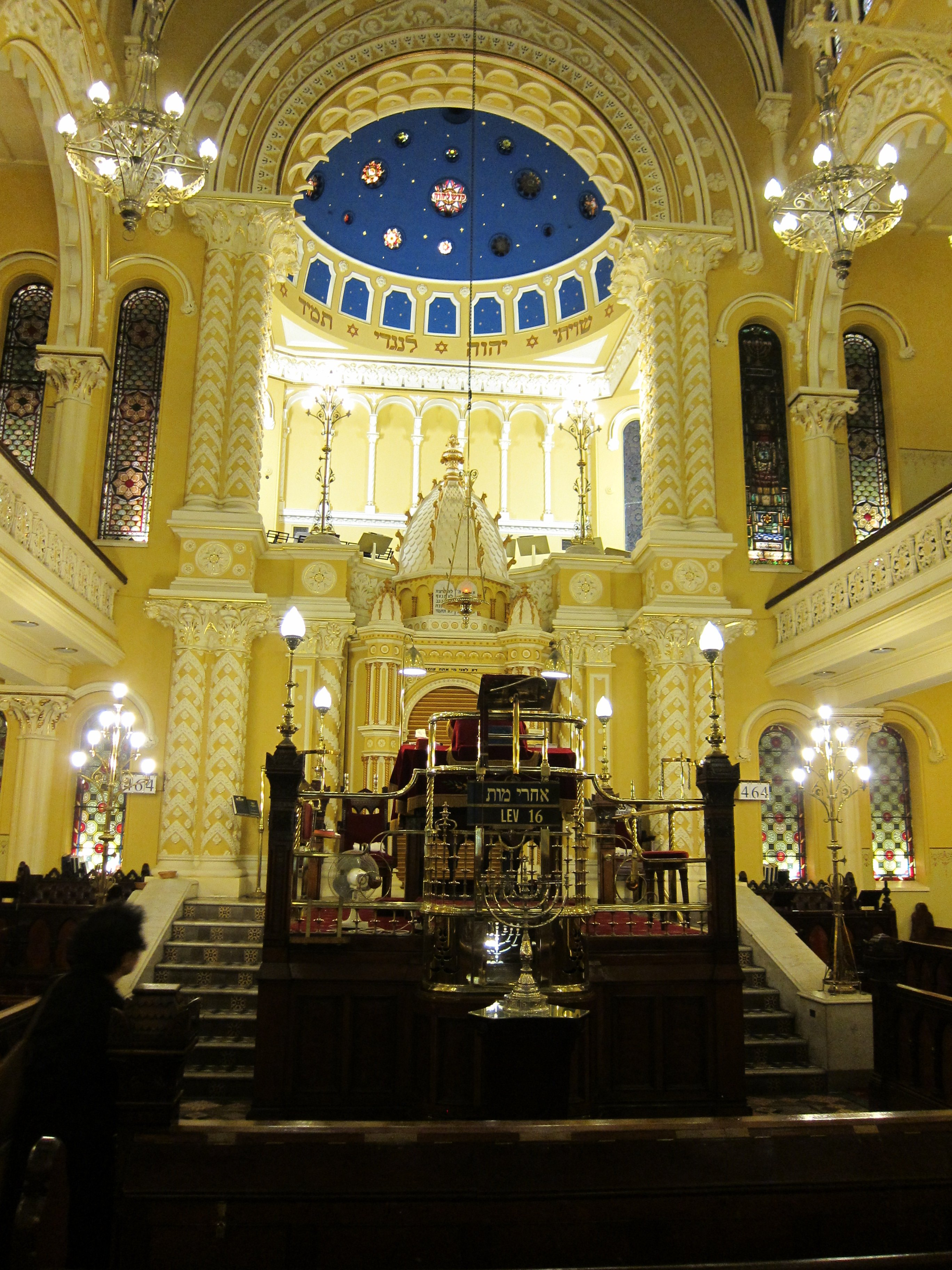
The Great Synagogue of Sydney.

The history of Jews in Australia traces the history of Australian Jews from the British settlement of Australia commencing in 1788. Though Europeans had visited Australia before 1788, there is no evidence of any Jewish sailors among the crew. The first Jews known to have come to Australia came as convicts transported to Botany Bay in 1788 aboard the First Fleet that established the first European settlement on the continent, on the site of present-day Sydney.

97,335 Australian residents identified themselves as Jewish by religion in the 2011 census, but the actual number was estimated to be 112,000 (An answer to the question on the census was optional). In the 2021 census 99,956 residents identified themselves as religious Jews, but in the same census only 29,115 identified themselves as Jewish by preferred ancestry, so the number of Jewish Australians simply is not known. Given more than two centuries of Jewish migration to Australia and the extent of moving away from or marrying out of Judaism, as many as 250,000 Australian residents may have Jewish ancestries. The majority are Ashkenazi Jews, many of them Jewish refugees, including Holocaust survivors, who arrived during and after World War II, and their descendants. (Note: Includes people who arrived on HMT Dunera and their descendants.) Jews make up about 0.5% of the Australian population.

== History ==
Major general histories of the Jews in Australia are Hilary L. Rubinstein and William D. Rubinstein, The Jews in Australia: A Thematic History (2 vols., 1991) and Suzanne D. Rutland, Edge of the Diaspora: Two Centuries of Jewish Settlement in Australia (2001; first ed. 1988). Each of these academic historians has written more concise general histories also, with Hilary L. Rubinstein's Chosen: The Jews in Australia (1987) being the first overall history of Australian Jewry, and described by Rabbi Raymond Apple as skilfully and stylishly weaving together the strands of the story of a colourful minority group and its interaction with general society. Rabbi John Simon Levi, co-author of Australian Genesis: Jewish Convicts and Settlers, 1788-1850 (1974) has authored the magisterial biographical directory, These Are The Names: Jewish Lives in Australia, 1788-1860 (2013). The Australian Jewish Historical Society Journal (started 1939) appears twice a year, published in Sydney and Melbourne respectively. There are also a number of published monographs on aspects of Australian Jewish history, for a guide to which (as well as to Australian Jewish literature) Serge Liberman, A Bibliography of Australasian Judaica, 1788-2008 (2011) is a distinguished reference work.

=== Colonial era ===
Australian Jews never constituted more than 1% of the total colonial community. Eight convicts transported to Botany Bay in 1788 aboard the First Fleet have been identified as Jewish. There were probably more, but exact numbers are not possible as the transportation records did not indicate a convict's religion. Over a thousand more people of Jewish descent are estimated to have been sent to Australia as convicts during the next 60 years. Most of them came from London, were of working-class background and were male. Only 7% of Jewish convicts were female, compared to 15% for non-Jewish convicts. The average age of the Jewish convicts was 25, but ranged as young as 8 to some elderly people. Esther Abrahams (who arrived with the First Fleet, with her baby daughter Roseanna) and Ikey Solomon were among the convicts who were Jewish.

At first, the Church of England was the established religion in the colony, and during the early years of transportation all convicts were required to attend Anglican services on Sundays. This included Irish Catholics as well as Jews. Similarly, education in the new settlement was Anglican church-controlled until the 1840s.

The first move towards organisation in the community was the formation of a Chevra Kadisha (a Jewish burial society) in Sydney in 1817. In 1820, William Cowper allotted land for the establishment of a Jewish cemetery in the right-hand corner of the then-Christian cemetery. The Jewish section was created to enable the burial of one Joel Joseph. During the next ten years there was no great increase in membership of the society, and its services were not called for more than once a year. The actual allocation of land for a consecrated Jewish cemetery was not approved until 1832.

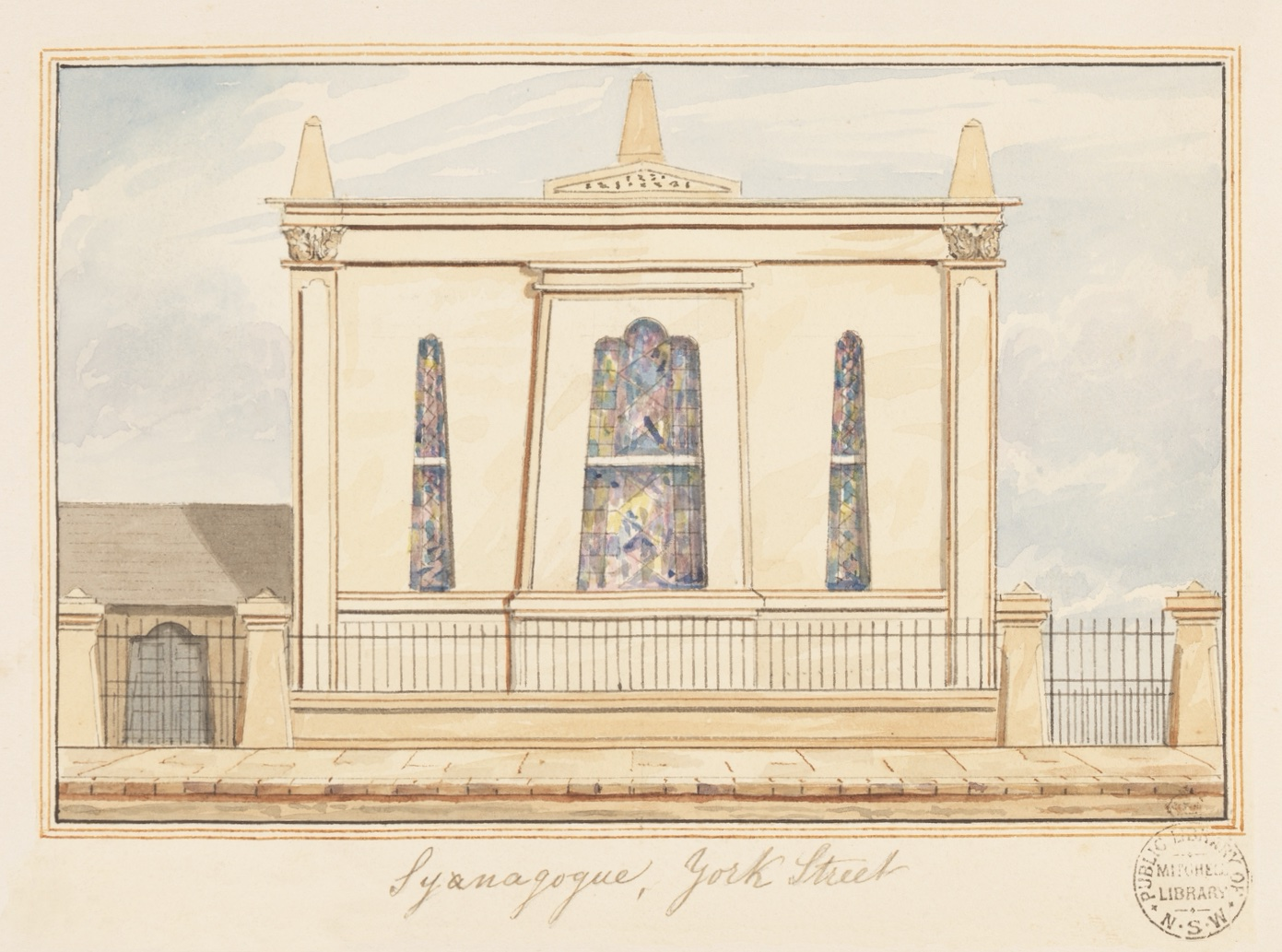
York Street Synagogue, Sydney, 1840s

The first Jewish services in the colony were conducted from 1820 in private homes by emancipist Joseph Marcus, one of the few convicts with Jewish knowledge. An account of the period stated:

In 1827 and 1828 then the worldly condition of the Hebrews in the colony improved considerably, in consequence of the great influx of respectable merchants; and this, with other circumstances, has raised the Hebrews in the estimation of their fellow colonists. About this period P. J. Cohen having offered the use of his house for the purpose, divine worship was performed for the first time in the colony according to the Hebrew form, and was continued regularly every Sabbath and holiday. From some difference of opinion then existing among the members of this faith, divine service was also performed occasionally in a room hired by Messrs. A. Elias and James Simmons. In this condition everything in connection with their religion remained until the arrival of Rev. Aaron Levi, in the year 1830. He had been a dayyan, and, duly accredited, he succeeded in instilling into the minds of the congregation a taste for the religion of their fathers. A Sefer Torah [scroll of the Law] was purchased by subscription, divine service was more regularly conducted, and from this time may be dated the establishment of the Jewish religion in Sydney. In 1832 they formed themselves into a proper congregation, and appointed Joseph Barrow Montefiore as the first president.

In 1830 or 1832, the first Jewish wedding in Australia was celebrated, the contracting parties being Moses Joseph and Rosetta Nathan. Three years later a Mr Rose came from England and acted as the chazzan, shochet, and mohel. He was succeeded by Jacob Isaacs.

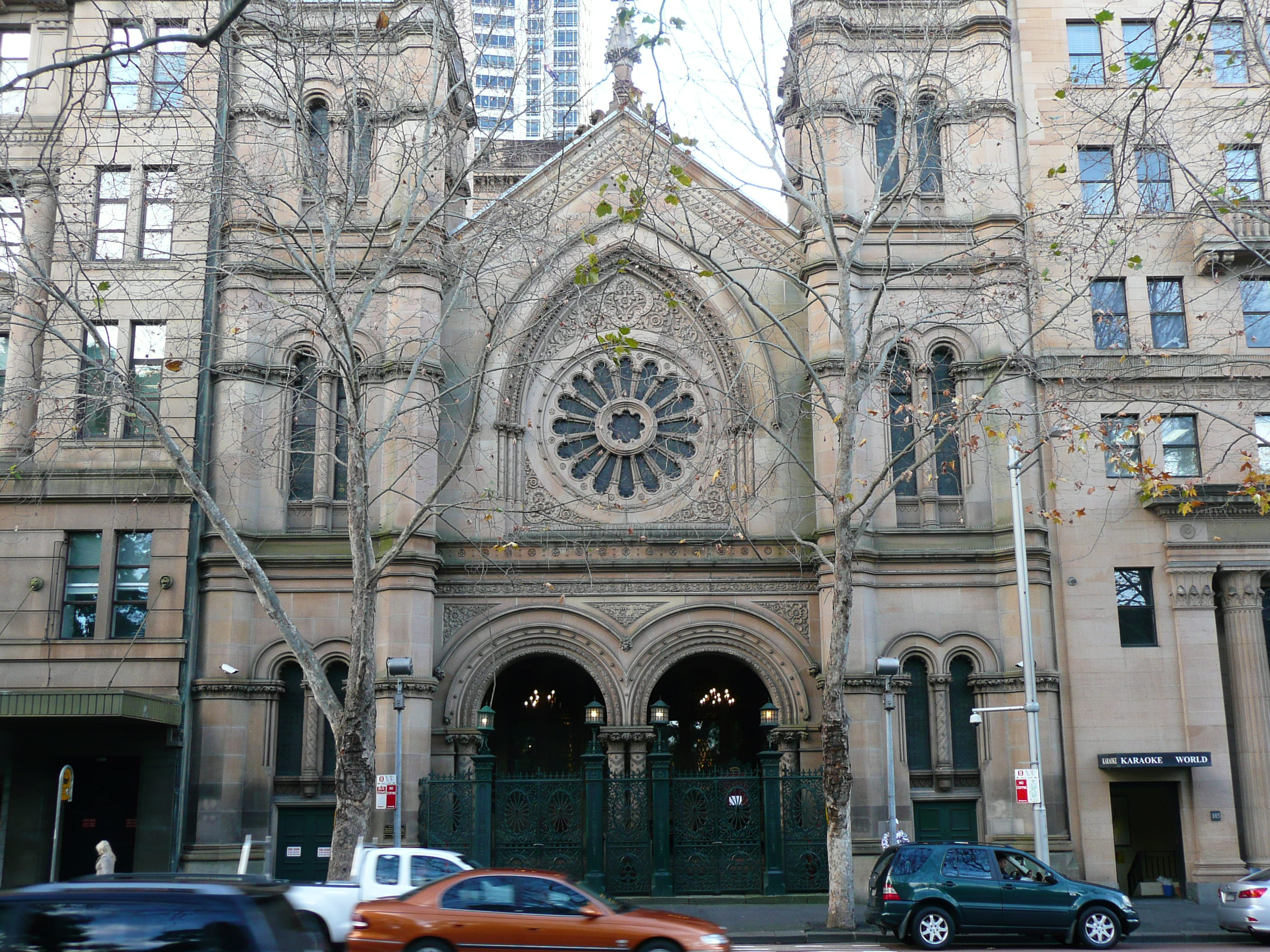
The Great Synagogue, Elizabeth Street, Sydney, constructed in 1878

Over the following decades, the community's numbers increased, primarily as a result of Jewish immigration from the United Kingdom and Germany. Kehillas (organized communities) began to be established in Sydney (1831) and Melbourne (1841). The condition of the Jewish community improved to such an extent that in 1844 the first synagogue was formed in York Street, Sydney using rented space, which continued in use for more than thirty years.

The 1841 census shows that New South Wales Jewry accounted for 65.3% of the total Australian Jewish population, and 0.57% of the total Australian population. In 1848, there were 200 Jews in Victoria, and they formed the Melbourne Jewish Philanthropic Society to provide assistance to those in need.

Although the Jewish community was primarily Ashkenazi, some Sephardi Jews also immigrated to Australia, and the community thrived during the mid-to-late 19th century. For some twenty years, there was a Sephardic congregation, and some Sephardi families occupied important communal positions. Gradually, however, the Sephardi population declined, and the congregation was disbanded in 1873.

The gold rush of the 1850s attracted a wave of immigrants, and Jewish immigrants soon outnumbered native-born Jews. Initially, they settled in rural areas, but by the end of the 19th century the lack of Jewish communal connections and fear of assimilation led most Australian Jews in rural areas to relocate to the Jewish centres in cities. As a result, the rapidly growing community in Sydney needed larger facilities, and built the Great Synagogue, located on Elizabeth Street, opposite Hyde Park, which was consecrated in 1878.

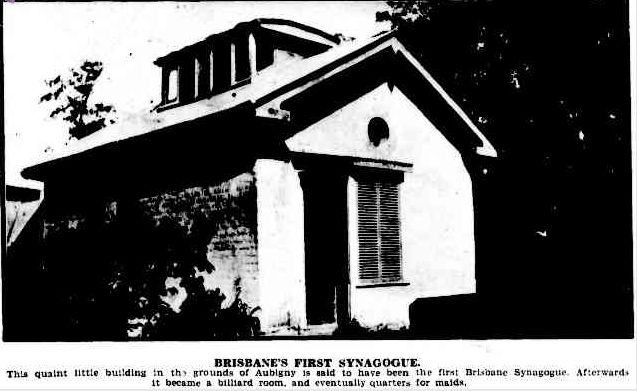
Brisbane's First Synagogue in the grounds of Samuel Davis's home on North Quay, 1930

When Queensland separated from New South Wales in 1859, Jewish people began to settle in Brisbane, forming the Brisbane Hebrew Congregation in 1865. The congregation used a number of venues as temporary places of worship, including a building in the grounds of Samuel Davis's home at North Quay (the house later known as Aubigny), while raising money through various land speculations to purchase a site and build a synagogue. They purchased land in Margaret Street for £200 and in 1885 called for designs, choosing the plans of Arthur Morry, an architect who worked for the Queensland Colonial Architect. Arthur Midson, a prominent Brisbane building contractor, built the Synagogue for the sum of £6450. The Brisbane Synagogue was consecrated on 18 July 1886, its spiritual name being "Kehilla Kedosha Sha'ari Emuna" (The Holy Congregation of the Gates of Faith).

The Jewish press in Australia was pioneered in Melbourne. In 1895, Sydney's first Jewish newspaper, called the Hebrew Standard of Australasia, was published, and is the forerunner of The Australian Jewish News.

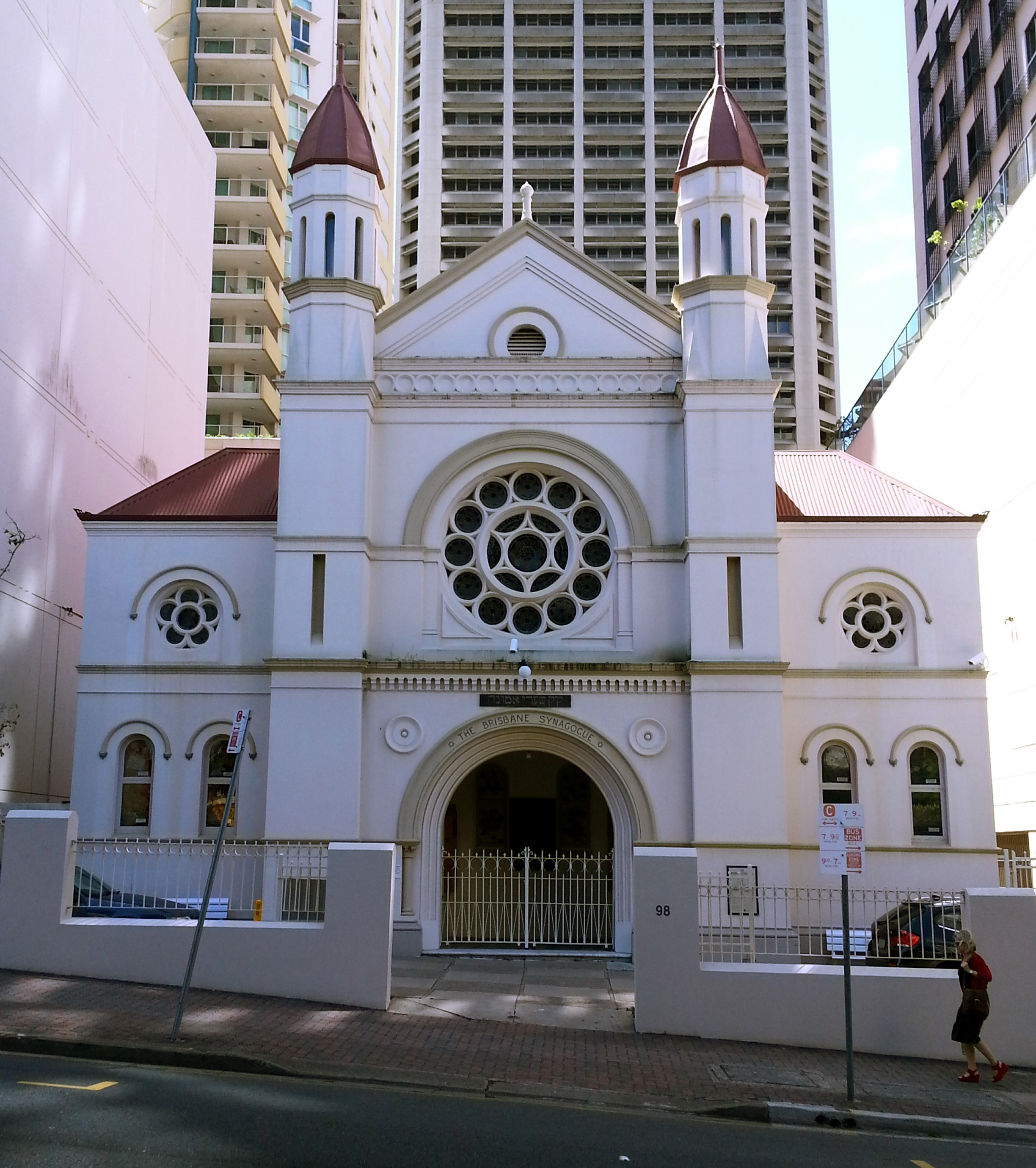
Brisbane Synagogue, 2012

At the end of the 19th century and the beginning of the 20th, as Australia was unifying its colonies into a single independent country, a new wave of Jewish immigration began. Jewish refugees from Russia and Poland began arriving in the 1890s, fleeing pogroms in their native lands. This immigration wave led to a divide among urban Jewish communities. Most Jews in Sydney were from Western and Central Europe, and were largely secular. Meanwhile, Jewish immigrants from Eastern Europe settled in Melbourne, and were highly Orthodox. In addition, thousands of highly observant Jews immigrated from South Africa and settled in Perth.

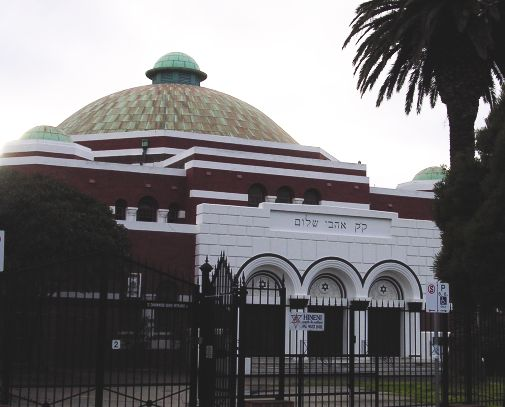
St Kilda Synagogue

Jews also began to assemble in Melbourne, then in the Port Phillip District (now Victoria). The Melbourne Hebrew Congregation was formed in 1841, and the first synagogue building opened in 1847 at 472 Bourke Street, with a seating capacity of 100. Other synagogues were built in Hobart (1845), Launceston (1846) and Adelaide (1850).

With the arrival of large numbers of immigrants in the 1850s, especially during the Victorian Gold Rush, there was a need for a larger synagogue in Melbourne. Construction of a larger 600 seat synagogue at South Yarra commenced in March 1855. Other Jewish congregations were formed in Geelong, Bendigo, and Ballarat (1853). The East Melbourne Hebrew Congregation split from the Bourke St congregation in 1857. The St Kilda Hebrew Congregation was formed in 1871, with the first services held in St Kilda Town Hall and the building of a permanent building in Charnwood Road, St Kilda, commencing in 1872. Since the 1850s, Melbourne has had the largest Jewish population in the country. A religious court (Beth Din) was set up in Melbourne in 1866.

=== 20th century ===
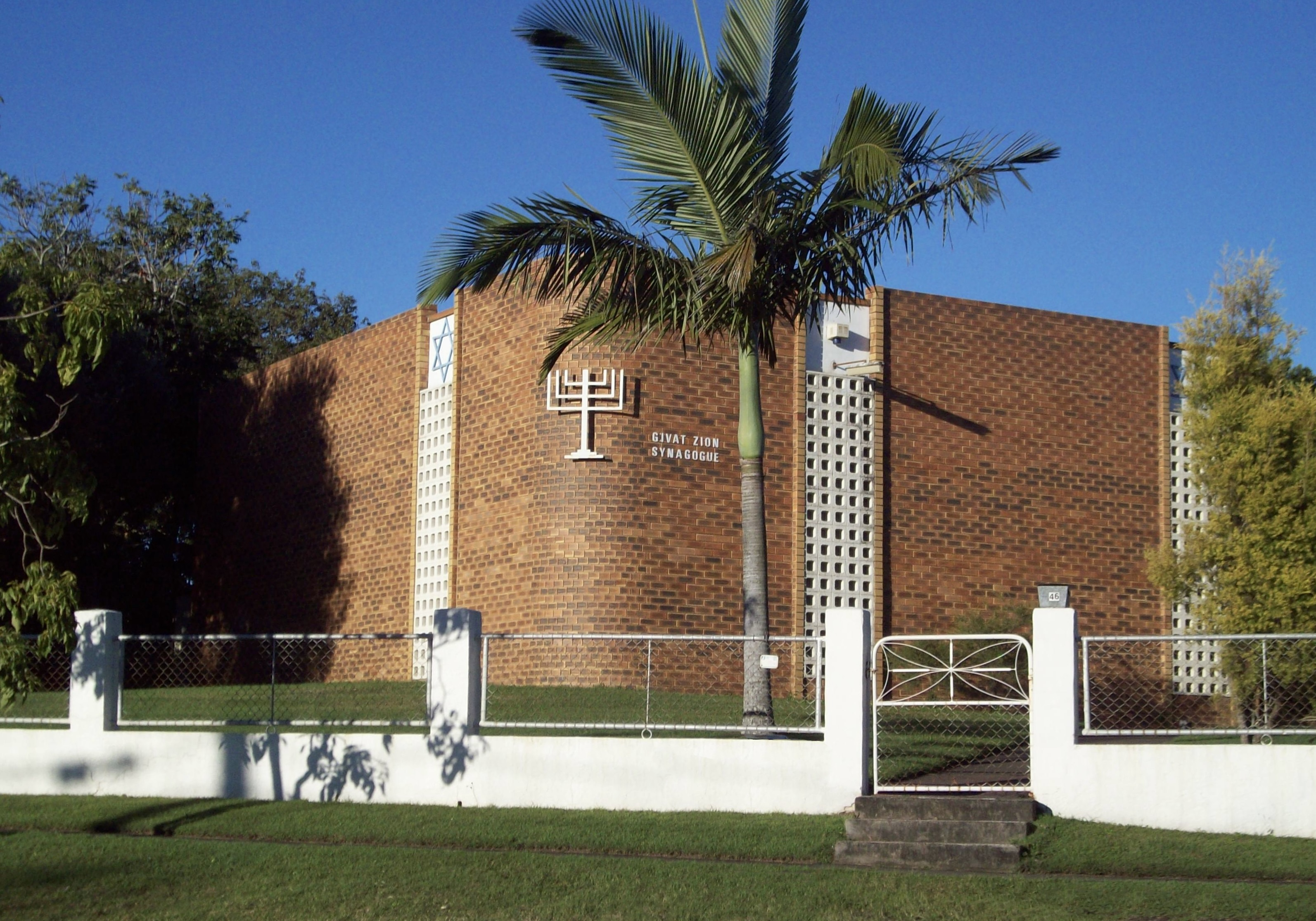
Givat Zion Synagogue, Greenslopes, Queensland

By 1901 it is estimated there were over 15,000 Jews in Australia. When Australia federated in 1901, some of the founders were Jewish. From the outset, Jews were treated as equal citizens with freedom to participate in economic and cultural life, and played an important role in their development. Antisemitism, which was common in contemporary Europe, was very rare in Australia.

Following World War I, another stream of Jewish immigrants came including Russian and Polish Jewish refugees, and when the Nazis took power in Germany in 1933, many German Jews came to Australia. The Australian government was initially hesitant in permitting entry to the many Jews who wanted to come, but in 1938, it allotted 15,000 visas for "victims of oppression". Some 7,000 Jews were able to take up the visas before the outbreak of World War II put an end to the program.

With the outbreak of World War II, the Australian government instituted a policy of interning German nationals, termed enemy aliens, including refugees from Nazism. Among these were Jews who had German passports, such as sculptor Karl Duldig and artist and inventor Slawa Duldig and their two-year-old daughter Eva. They were sent, with nearly 300 other internees to isolated Tatura Internment Camp 3 D near Shepparton, in northern Victoria. There, armed soldiers manned watchtowers and scanned the camp that was bordered by a barbed wire fence with searchlights, and other armed soldiers patrolled the camp. Petitions to Australian politicians, stressing that they were Jewish refugees and therefore being unjustly imprisoned, had no effect. They remained in the internment camp until 1942, when the father enlisted in the Australian Army. Their daughter, Eva Duldig, was years later a top tennis player for Australia.

Organisations during WWII tried to help children affected by the war by bringing them to Australia but were only able to after the war ended. During WWII transportation for civilians was limited, so no Jewish orphans could be brought over even though the Australian government increased their allowance quota for orphaned children. After the war, the pre-war anti-Jewish refugee sentiment influenced the government's choice not to fund any Jewish immigration, saying it was the Jewish community's responsibility to bring over the refugees. This made it so sponsors and organisations were the ones to help fund the Jewish refugee's journey and settlement into the Australia Jewish community.

In the aftermath of World War II Australia abandoned its previous Anglo-centric immigration policy and permitted immigration of large numbers of people from continental Europe. Many European Jews, survivors of the Holocaust, arrived in the country from displaced persons camps, but there were instances of antisemitism. For example, K. M. Bolton of the Returned Services League tried to encourage the government and the immigration Minister Arthur A. Calwell to stem the flow of displaced persons, and other groups published cartoons opposing immigration of Jews.

From 1938 to 1961 the Jewish population almost tripled in size from the 1933 population to 61,000 Jews living in Australia. Organisations during the war tried to bring over and place children affected by the war, but were only able to after the war ended. Two organisations assisting with the immigration, specifically of orphaned children were Save the Children’s Scheme and the Jewish Welfare Guardian Scheme, who brought over a total of 317 orphaned Jewish children from Europe in the years after the war. The girls brought over were placed into orphanages, while the boys were placed into hostels, where they lived with other holocaust survivors.

In 1940 there were 2,500 German and Austrian refugee internees including 1,750 Jewish refugees, known as the Dunera internees, were all immediately sent to an internment camp in Hay, New South Wales. A large number of the new immigrants were observant Jews, and day-school attendance rose steadily. A new Sephardic community also emerged in the post-war period. Previously, Mizrahi Jews were generally not permitted to enter due to Australia's White Australia policy. However, following the Suez Crisis in 1956, a number of Egyptian Jews were allowed to enter. Over the following years, overtures from Jewish communities led the government to drop its previous stance on entry of Mizrahi Jews. By 1969, when Iraqi Jews were being persecuted, the government granted refugee status to Iraqi Jews who managed to reach Australia.

In the 1970s, the Australian Jewish community was concerned by the rising intermarriage rate which impacted the numbers of Jews with bonds to the community. By the early 1980s, intermarriage again dropped to one of the lowest rates in the diaspora. The community was further bolstered by immigration from South Africa, and starting in 1989, from the former Soviet Union.

Throughout the 20th century, many Jews served as elected officials. Among the positions held by Jews were five mayors of Adelaide, at least two of Melbourne, and a similar number in Sydney, a premier of South Australia, speaker of the House of Representatives, and speaker of Parliament. Many Jewish elected officials simultaneously served as the heads of their kehillas. However, the successful integration of Jews into Australian society led to a rise in assimilation. Intermarriage rates rose, synagogue attendance dropped, and many Jews stopped practising Judaism altogether. However, there were still many who chose to remain observant.

=== Recent history ===
JewishCare is among Australia's largest and oldest Jewish aid organisations, started in 1935 as the Australian Jewish Welfare Society to assist with Jewish migration from Nazi Germany. It is still engaged in assisting migrants and providing other welfare services.

The Jewish community's Jewish Museum of Australia opened in Melbourne in 1982 and the Sydney Jewish Museum opened in 1992 to commemorate the Holocaust, as well as to "challenge visitors' perceptions of democracy, morality, social justice and human rights". There was an increase in immigration from Australia to Israel in 2010, when 240 Australians moved to Israel, up from 165 in 2009. On 30 June 2023, the Queensland Holocaust Museum and Education Centre in Brisbane opened as the first Jewish Museum in Queensland.

The government of Israel received adverse publicity with the revelation that their spies were travelling on Australian passports, either forged or borrowed from Jewish travellers, in 2003 and 2010.

On 27 November 2016, the Annual Report of the Executive Council of Australian Jewry (ECAJ) on antisemitism in Australia, reported that in the 12-month period ending 30 September 2016 there was a 10% increase in antisemitic incidents in Australia involving threats or acts of violence over the previous year.

There was a further uptick in antisemitic incidents, particularly in Sydney, since the protracted Israel-Gaza War and Gaza genocide after the October 7 attacks by Hamas. In January 2025 the Albanese government announced the construction of a National Holocaust Education Centre in Canberra as well as funding for an upgrade to the Holocaust Institute of Western Australia's Education Centre in the Perth suburb of Yokine, to educate schoolchildren.

On 14 December 2025, a terrorist mass shooting occurred at Bondi Beach in Sydney, in the early evening during a Hanukkah celebration attended by approximately one thousand people. Two alleged gunmen, Sajid Akram and Naveed Akram, killed 15 people, including a 10 year old child. The incident was identified as Islamic State inspired and was deliberately targeting the Hanukkah celebration.

== Public life ==
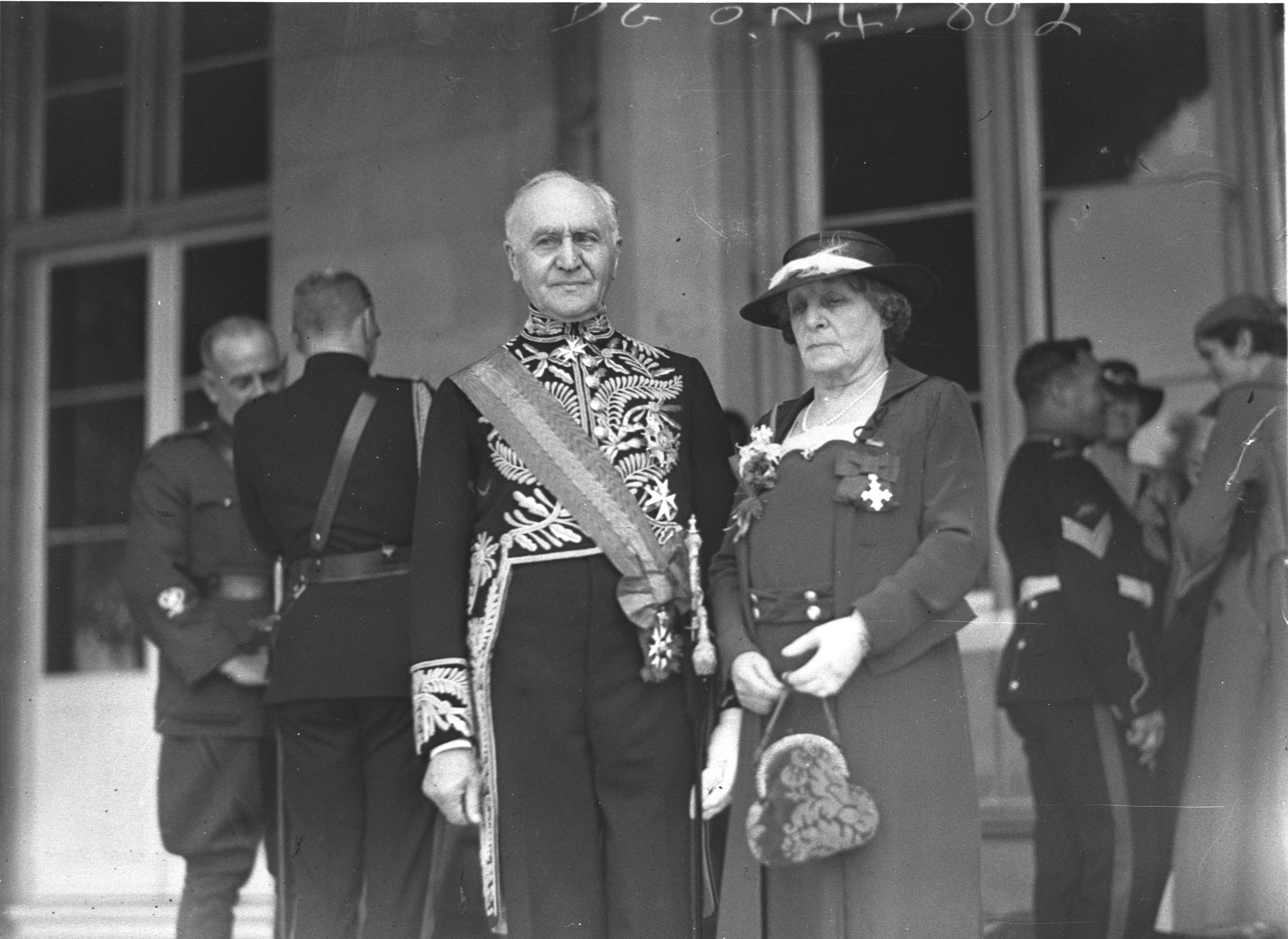
Sir Isaac Isaacs was the first Australian born Governor General of Australia and was the first Jewish vice-regal representative in the British Empire.

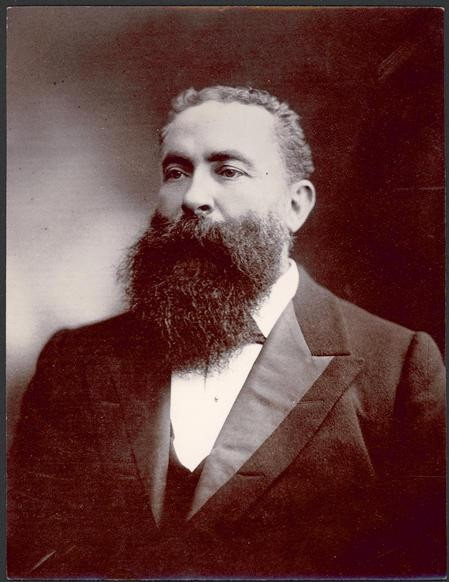
Vaiben Solomon served briefly as South Australia's premier in 1899.

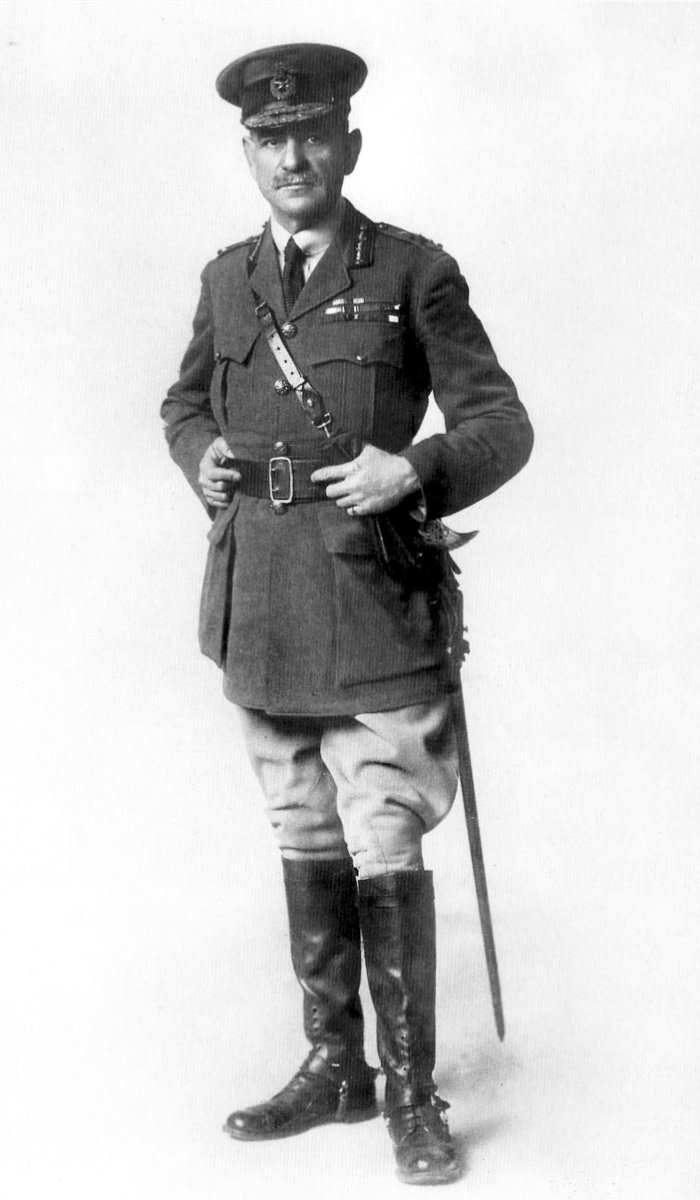
Sir John Monash in 1918. Monash was one of the most distinguished Allied commanders of the Western Front during World War I.

Jews have also figured prominently in Australian honours and include Nobel Prize winner Bernard Katz.

Besides his diverse business interests in Sydney, Sir Saul Samuel was the first Jew to become a magistrate, to sit in a colonial parliament and to become a government minister. In 1854 he was appointed to the New South Wales Legislative Council and subsequently was an elected member of the Legislative Assembly. He also served periods as Treasurer and Postmaster General. Vaiben Solomon was Premier of South Australia for a week in 1899. Leo Port was Lord Mayor of Sydney between 1975 and 1978.

In 1931, Sir Isaac Isaacs was the first Australian-born Governor-General, and was the first Jewish vice-regal representative in the British Empire. Sir Zelman Cowen also served as Governor-General, between 1977 and 1982. Linda Dessau has been Governor of Victoria since July 2015, the first woman and the first Jew to serve in the position. Sir John Monash, a distinguished Australian Lieutenant-General during World War I, led Australian troops both in Gallipoli and on the Western Front. The agent-generalship of New South Wales has been administered by two Jews: Sir Saul Samuel, one of the most prominent and successful Jews in Australian politics, and Sir Julian Salomons.

Several Jews have served as Chief Justices of various states. Sir Julian Salomons was Chief Justice of New South Wales for a fortnight in 1886; James Spigelman was the Chief Justice of NSW from 19 May 1998 to 31 May 2011. Mahla Pearlman was Chief Judge of the NSW Land and Environment Court from 1992 to 2003, and she was the first woman chief judge in any (State) jurisdiction in Australia. Jews are especially prominent in the legal profession; for example, in Melbourne alone, the Hon. Michael Rozenes sits as Chief Judge of the County Court of Victoria, Justice Redlich sits on the Court of Appeal, while Justices Raymond Finkelstein, Alan Goldberg, Mark Weinberg, Ronald Sackville and Ron Merkel have all sat in recent years on the Federal Court of Australia. James Edelman is a justice of the Federal Court, and is appointed to be a justice of the High Court of Australia.

David Bennett is a Sydney barrister. He was president of the Australian Bar Association from 1995 to 1996 and of the NSW Bar Association from 1995 to 1997. Bennett was president of the Association of Lawyer Arbitrators and Mediates in 1998 and President of the Australian Academy of Forensic Sciences from 1999 to 2001. He was Solicitor-General of Australia from 1998 to 2008. Bennett was awarded the Centenary Medal in 2003. His wife, Annabelle Bennett is a Judge of the Federal Court of Australia.

== Commerce ==
Among the Jews who have figured as business pioneers in Australia were Joseph Barrow Montefiore (1803–1893) and his brother Jacob Barrow Montefiore (1801–1895), one of the founders of the colony of South Australia, as he was selected by the British government to act on the first board of commissioners, appointed in 1835 to conduct its affairs. Jacob's portrait hangs in the Art Gallery of South Australia, and his memory is perpetuated by Montefiore Hill, a vantage point which overlooks the city of Adelaide. Their nephew Jacob Levi Montefiore (1819–1885), whose mother was a first cousin of Sir Moses Montefiore, and J. B. Montefiore gave an impetus to the progress of New South Wales. Jacob owned one of the largest sheep-runs in the colony, and founded and for many years acted as director of the Bank of Australasia. The close connection of these two with the colony is further evidenced by the township of Montefiore, New South Wales, which stands at the junction of the Bell and Macquarie rivers in the Wellington valley. Joseph Montefiore was the first president of the first Jewish congregation formed in Sydney in 1832.

V. L. Solomon of Adelaide is remembered for the useful work he achieved in exploring the vast Northern Territory, the interests of which he represented in Parliament. M. V. Lazarus of Bendigo, known as Bendigo Lazarus, also did much to open up new parts in the back country of Victoria. Nathaniel Levi, for many years urged the cultivation of beetroot for the production of sugar and spirits owed its brief existence as an industry to Levi's own interest in raw material for his distilling company. In his labours on behalf of this industry he published in 1870 a work of 250 pages on the value and adaptability of the sugar-beet. In Western Australia, the townships of Karridale and Boyanup owe their existence to the enterprise of M. C. Davies, a large lumber merchant.

== Arts and culture ==
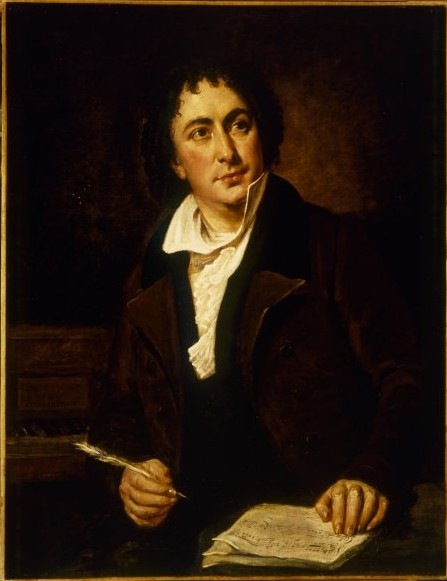
Isaac Nathan c. 1820. Artist unknown, probably one of Lord Byron's portraitists.

Barnett Levy founded an early theatre in Australia. He was refused a license by then Governor Darling in 1828, though in the following year he was permitted to hold approved performances in his Sydney Hotel. A record of the event is found in an entry in "Sydney in 1848", a work published in that year: "In the late twenties His Excellency Sir R. Bourke granted Barnett Levy a license for dramatic performances, with a restriction that he should confine himself to the representation of such pieces only as had been licensed in England by the Lord Chamberlain." Levy was at that time the owner of the original Royal Hotel in George Street; and he fitted up the saloon of that establishment as a theatre, where the first representations of the legitimate drama in the colony were given. The encouragement that this undertaking received induced the enterprising proprietor to enlarge his sphere of activity. He built a theatre called the Theatre Royal, which was opened in 1833, at a cost which almost bankrupted him.

Isaac Nathan, who emigrated to Australia in 1841, wrote the first Australian opera, Don John of Austria to a libretto by Jacob Levi Montefiore. It premiered on 3 May 1847 at the Royal Victoria Theatre, Sydney.

There have been Jewish contributions to Australian visual arts. Georges Mora, born Gunter Morawski in 1913 in Leipzig, Germany, of Jewish/Polish heritage, fled Germany to Paris in 1930, then to Melbourne in 1949. He established the Tolarno Gallery in Melbourne's bohemian St Kilda. This became a venue for exhibitions of Australian Modernist avant garde art. His wife, Mirka Mora, became a prominent artist. Printmaker and projection artist Ludwig Hirschfeld Mack graduate and professor of the Bauhaus was deported to Australia as an "enemy alien" on the ship HMT Dunera, spending time in internment camps in Hay, Orange and Tatura, before being sponsored for Australian citizenship by (Sir) James Darling, headmaster of Geelong Church of England Grammar School. He was influential in the introduction of Bauhaus principles into visual art and design curricula in Australia. E. P. Fox and Abbey Alston have achieved distinction. Paintings by both these artists have been hung in the Melbourne National Gallery. In the Adelaide Gallery hangs a tribute to the memory of H. Abrahams for the services he rendered to the progress of art in Australia. Two Jews of Australian birth, S. Alexander and Joseph Jacobs, have attained some distinction as writers.

There has long been an Australian Jewish media sector. From The Australian Jewish News, to radio shows, online magazines, periodicals, and blogs, Jewish Australians have contributed to media serving both the Jewish community, as well as the wider Australian society.

In May 2004, art collector and dealer, Joseph Brown, donated his substantial collection of Australian art of the 20th century to the National Gallery of Victoria. It was the largest single gift of works of art ever made to a public gallery in Australia. Brown migrated from Poland in 1933. He was appointed an Officer of the Order of Australia (AO) for his services to the arts.

== Antisemitism ==
Since the days of European settlement in Australia, Jews have enjoyed formal equality before the law and have not been subject to civil disabilities or other forms of state-sponsored antisemitism excluding them from full participation in public life. Jews have been active contributors in science, art, and literature, and in the government of the colonial and Commonwealth eras, with a number attaining prominent public offices, including several governors-general. Despite this tolerant ethos, Australia rejected a Jewish refugee resettlement proposal, during World War II.

Post-war Jewish immigration came at a time when antisemitism was rife, with the Returned Services League publishing cartoons to encourage the government and Immigration Minister Arthur A. Calwell to stem the flow of Jewish immigrants. Attacks on Jewish property and institutions increased with tensions in the Middle East, with corresponding increases in security precautions. In 1975, ASIO documents revealed that Palestinian terrorists planned to kill high-profile Jewish figures including the Israeli ambassador Michael Elizur and "Zionist spokesmen" Isi Leibler and Sam Lipski. Former prime minister Bob Hawke, "one of Israel's most vocal supporters", was also considered for attack.

Synagogues across Australia are often targeted in acts of vandalism. For instance, in the 21st century, vandalism and arson attacks on synagogues have occurred in 2000 (Sydney, Canberra), 2001 (Canberra), 2002 (Melbourne, Sydney), 2004 (Perth), 2005 (Melbourne, Newcastle), 2006 (Sydney) 2008 (Melbourne, Sydney), 2010 (Perth), Brisbane (2011), 2016 (Sydney), 2018 (Canberra), 2022 (Melbourne), and 2023 (Maitland).

There have been numerous incidences of antisemitic activities on university campuses. For example, antisemitic material had been found on five university campuses in March 2017.

There are a number organisations that track antisemitic activity, including the Executive Council of Australian Jewry that publish an annual report for all reported antisemitic activity, the Anti-Defamation Commission Melbourne and Anti-Defamation Unit in Sydney. The incidents include attacks on synagogues and various speeches with antisemitic content. The Jewish community in Melbourne supports an "anti-defamation commission" (ADC) which makes monthly reports to police of offensive graffiti found in public toilets and elsewhere.

In December 2025, a Hanukkah celebration at Bondi Beach in Sydney became the site of a deadly antisemitic terrorist attack. Two gunmen, identified as a father and son, opened fire on about 1000 people, mostly in family groups, celebrating a "Chanukah by the Sea" event organised by the Chabad of Bondi. Fifteen people were killed, including Holocaust survivor Alex Kleytman, Rabbi Eli Schlanger and 10-year-old Matilda Bee Britvan; dozens were injured. Authorities also discovered two improvised explosive devices at the scene. The attack was the deadliest mass shooting in Australia since 1996.

== Synagogues and religious affiliation ==
Until the 1930s, all synagogues in Australia were at least nominally Orthodox, with most acknowledging leadership of the Chief Rabbi of the United Kingdom. To this day the vast majority of synagogues in Australia are Orthodox. However, there is a wide range of Orthodox congregations, including Mizrachi, Chabad and Adass Israel congregations. There are also Sephardi congregations.

There had been short-lived efforts to establish Reform congregations as early as the 1890s. However, under the leadership of Ada Phillips, a sustained liberal congregation, Temple Beth Israel was established in Melbourne. Subsequently, another synagogue linked to the Reform Movement, Temple Emanuel, was established in Sydney in 1938. Following these two congregations, a number of other Liberal synagogues have been founded in other cities.

Since 1992 Conservative (Masorti) services have been held as an alternative service usually in the Neuweg, the smaller second synagogue within Temple Emanuel, Woollahra, Sydney. In 1999, Kehilat Nitzan, Melbourne's first Conservative (Masorti) Congregation was established, with foundation president Prof John Rosenberg. The congregation appointed its first rabbi, Ehud Bandel in 2006. In 2010 Beit Knesset Shalom became Brisbane's first Conservative (Masorti) synagogue.

In 2012, the first humanistic Jewish congregation, known as Kehilat Kolenu, was established in Melbourne with links to the cultural Jewish youth movement Habonim Dror. Later in 2012, a similar congregation was established in Sydney, known as Ayelet HaShachar. The services are loosely based on the Humanistic Jewish movement in the United States and the musical-prayer group Nava Tehila in Israel.

Australian synagogues have often been subjected to antisemitic attacks. As early as 1920, the synagogue in Toowoomba, Queensland was targeted in an arson attack that caused considerable damage. A major wave of attacks on synagogues occurred in 1991, leading to the destruction of the Bankstown Synagogue. In 2024, arsonists firebombed a synagogue in Melbourne, an event deemed an act of terrorism.

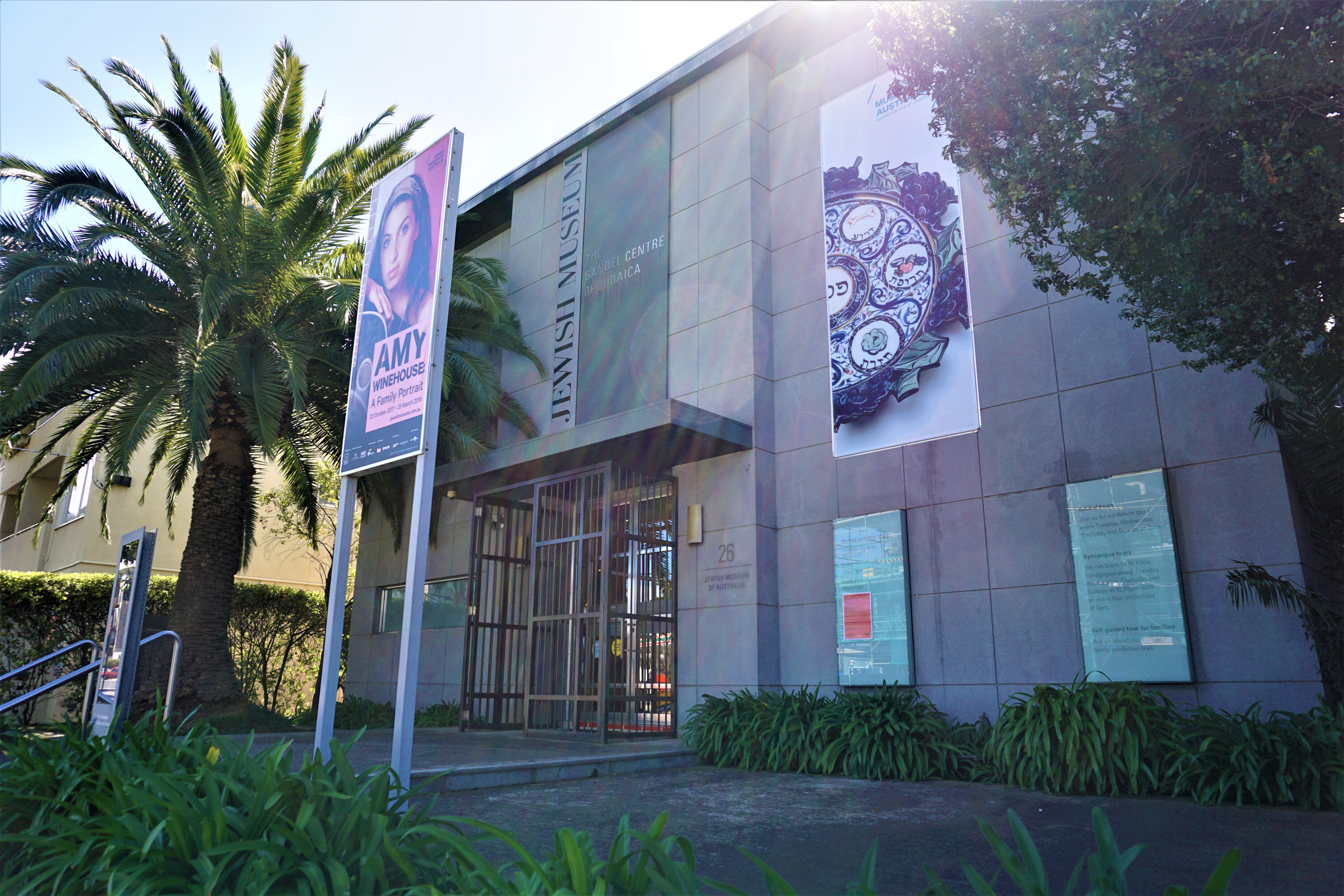
The Jewish Museum of Australia in St Kilda, a suburb of Melbourne.

In regional and remote Australia, Chabad of Rural and Regional Australia has coordinated holiday materials and visits by roving rabbis for isolated Jewish residents, including Rosh Hashanah packages and shofars for Jews far from established synagogues.

=== Synagogue robberies ===
Synagogues across Australia have occasionally been targeted by thieves, with incidents recorded from the 1880s through the 2000s. Early documented cases occurred in Melbourne in 1884, where a synagogue was robbed, followed by an 1885 case in Brisbane where vandalism also occurred during a synagogue break-in. In 1895, the synagogue in Ballarat was targeted by thieves. Subsequent incidents included multiple robberies in Melbourne, notably in 1921 and 1936, with stolen items from the latter discovered in a creek. In 1946, the Brisbane Street Synagogue in Perth fell victim to theft. Break-in cases during the 1950s occurred at a St Kilda Synagogue in 1952 and at the Central Synagogue in Sydney in 1959. Central Synagogue was also targeted in a robbery in 2001. Other notable cases include the theft of Torah scrolls, their ornaments, and various other ritual items from Maroubra Synagogue in 1977 with the unadorned scrolls later found abandoned in La Perouse, a robbery spree in 1980 affecting two synagogues, and a 1987 incident in Surfers Paradise, Queensland.

== Historiography and memory ==
The history of the Jews in Australia is contained in comprehensive major general histories by the academic historians Hilary L. Rubinstein, William Rubinstein, and Suzanne Rutland, as well as in specialised works by such scholars as Rabbi John Levi and Yossi Aron covering specific topics and time periods.

In 1939, a twice-a-year Australian Jewish Historical Society Journal was published in Sydney to cover the Jewish experience in Australia from the first day of British settlement through to contemporary times. The journal is now published online, alternately by Sydney (mid-year) and Melbourne (towards year's end). Articles are searchable and freely downloadable.

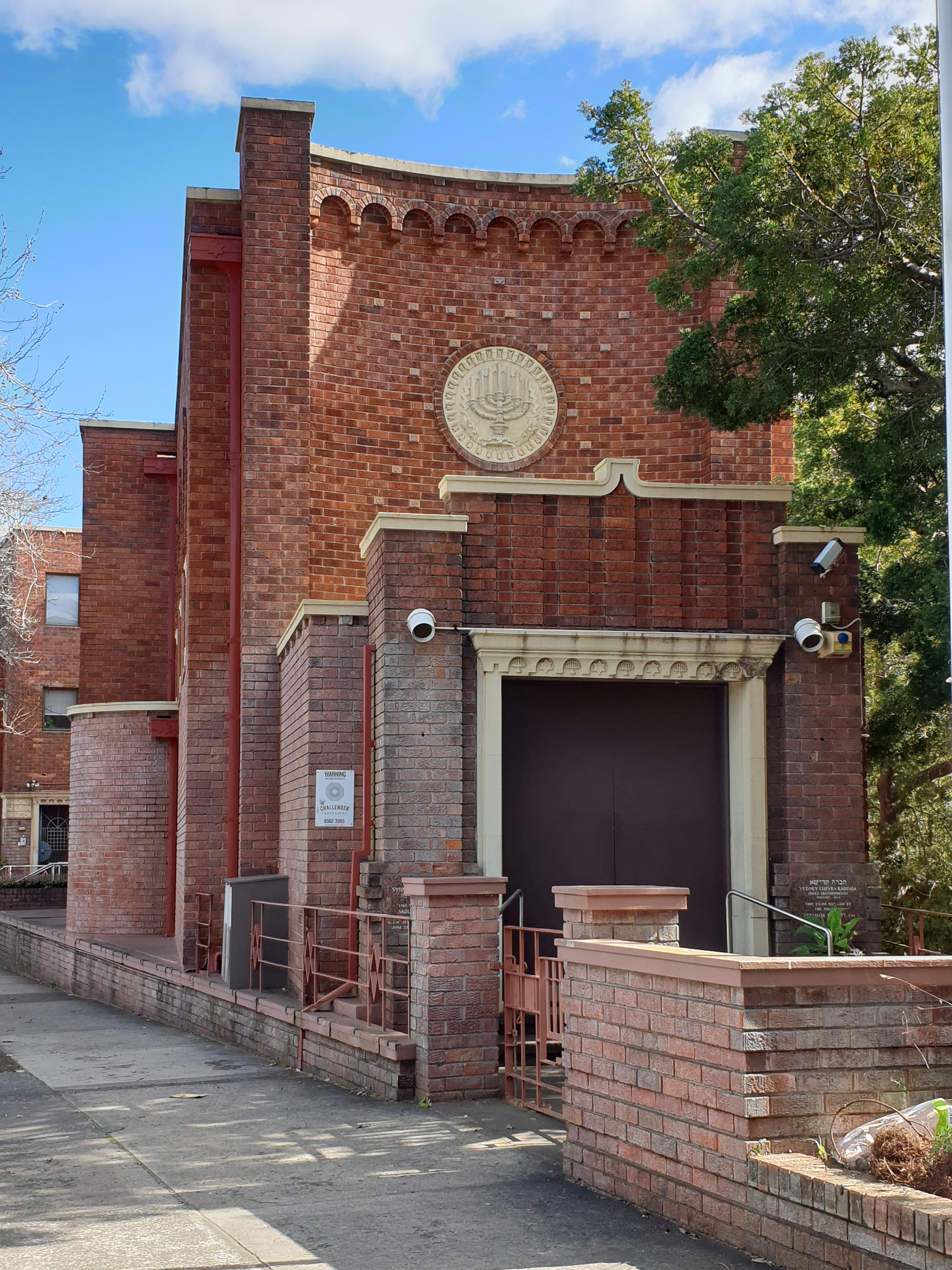
The chapel of the Sydney Chevra kadisha, Woollahra, New South Wales

== See also ==
- History of the Jews in Perth, Australia
- History of the Jews in Canberra
- Antisemitism in Australia
- Australian Jews
- List of Oceanian Jews
  - List of Jewish members of the Australian parliament
- Australian Association for Jewish Studies
- Australian Jewish Historical Society
- Jewish Museum of Australia
- Melbourne Jewish Radio
- The Museum of the Jewish People at Beit Hatfutsot
- Religion in Australia
- Hilary L. Rubinstein, historian
- William Rubinstein, historian
- Suzanne Rutland, historian at U of Sydney
- Zionist Federation of Australia
