= Shalom College =

Shalom College may refer to:

== Australia ==
- Shalom Catholic College, a Catholic school in Bundaberg, Queensland, Australia
- Shalom College (University of New South Wales), a residential college located on the Kensington campus of the University of New South Wales, in Sydney, Australia
