= Australian Jewish Historical Society =

Organization

- Formation: 1938
- Type: Historical society
- Headquarters: Melbourne, Victoria and Sydney, NSW
- Members: ~900
- Official language: English
- Website: Australian Jewish Historical Society

The Australian Jewish Historical Society was founded in 1938 in Sydney. The first president was Percy J. Marks. At the first business meeting of the Society, the then-president of the Royal Australian Historical Society K. R. Cramp expressed the view that the chief object of the Society should be the encouragement of individual research.

In 1939, the Society published the first issue of the Australian Jewish Historical Society Journal (initially known as the Australian Jewish Historical Society, Journal and Proceedings).

In 1949, a Melbourne branch was established, which was informally known as AJHS (Vic). This branch grew and eventually incorporated. There is no national executive, with the Sydney and Melbourne Societies being financially independent. Since 1988, the two Societies have shared the production of the Journal, with the June issues being produced by the NSW Society and the November issues being produced by the Vic Society. Currently, there are two issues of the Journal each year, with occasional Special Publications.

AJHS (NSW) has been charged by the NSW Jewish community to advise, collate and store the archives of the Sydney Jewish community. Professional archiving staff manage the extensive collection of documents and audio-visual records of the Jewish communal organisations and of communal leaders. Researchers may search the Archives or arrange to visit the offices at the Sydney Jewish Museum in Darlinghurst NSW.

The Society's website contains unique content chronicling the story of Jews in Australia since 1788. Included are databases of births, deaths and marriages with custom databases including Australian Jewish members of Parliament and names of all Jews who served in the Australian armed forces in the Boer (or South African) War, World War I and World War II which are invaluable tools for researchers and genealogists.

All issues of the Society's Journal are online. Membership is ($AUD60 p.a.)

AJHS (Vic) has also collected extensive archives, which were placed on indefinite loan to the State Library of Victoria in 2004. Since 2012 the AJHS (Vic) has shared with the Australian Jewish Genealogical Society of Victoria a library including both books and archival records within the Lamm Jewish Library of Australia.

In addition to the Sydney and Melbourne chapters, there is also a small Canberra-based affiliate and there are members in all states and overseas.

From 1977 to 2006, AJHS (Vic) members under the leadership of Beverley Davis transcribed the headstones of over 40,000 Jewish graves in Australia and New Zealand, as well as Jewish War Graves overseas. This collection of burial data, called The Beverley Davis Burial Database (BD-BD), was placed online in June 2008. It has since been updated with more than 84,000 records based on information from Chevrei Kadisha around Australia and is now incorporated into the Australian Jewish Historical Society website burial database.

In 2007, the Society under the leadership of AJHS (Vic) president Dr Howard Freeman made a notable but unsuccessful attempt to retain intact within Australia the so-called Gurewicz Archives. The Gurewicz Archives was collected by Rabbi Joseph Lipman Gurewicz, born in Vilna in 1885. Rabbi Gurewicz arrived in Australia in 1932, becoming the spiritual head of the United Congregations of Carlton. He was an authority in Halachic (legal) matters. The Archives consists of files of documents covering all matters related to Judaism and reflecting the variety of issues confronting Melbourne Jewry in the 1930s to 1950s. The New York purchaser removed much of the Holocaust material, rabbinic communications to Lithuania, Palestine, and material on the Dunera, and sold the remainder at auction to the Jewish Museum of Australia in June 2008.

== See also ==
- Australian Association for Jewish Studies
- Australian Jewish Genealogical Society
- History of the Jews in Australia
