= Hilary L. Rubinstein =

Australian historian and author (born 1946)

- Born: 1946 (age 79–80)
- Education: Keele University; Australian National University; Simmons University
- Occupation: Historian
- Spouse: William D. Rubinstein
- Writing career
- Genre: Non-fiction
- Subject: Military history

Hilary L. Rubinstein (born 1946) is an Australian historian and author. She researches and writes on British naval history and modern Jewish history.

== Biography ==
She graduated with a BA(Hons) in economics, history and politics at Keele University in England, having spent a year on an exchange scholarship at Swarthmore College, Pennsylvania, and subsequently gained a master's degree in librarianship from Simmons College, Massachusetts and a PhD in history for her thesis titled 'King Campbell: The public career of the Marquess of Argyll (1607?-1661)' from the Australian National University.

A Fellow of the Royal Historical Society, she spent two years (1991–93) as a research fellow in history at the University of Melbourne and from 2013-15 was an adjunct research fellow at the Australian Centre for Jewish Civilisation, Monash University. She is editor of the Melbourne issues of the Australian Jewish Historical Society Journal. She appeared in Bitter Herbs and Honey, directed by Monique Schwarz. Bitter Herbs and Honey gives a nostalgic look at Jewish settlement in the inner Melbourne suburb of Carlton. She was the Australian correspondent for the American Jewish Committee's American Jewish Year Book from 1992 to 1996. In 2018 she took over from Suzanne Rutland as Australian representative on the editorial board of the Jewish Women's Archive's Shalvi/HymanEncyclopedia of Jewish Women project.

She has contributed entries to both the Oxford Dictionary of National Biography (ODNB) and the Australian Dictionary of Biography (ADB). From 2007 - 2010 she served on the Council of the Navy Records Society, for which she more recently edited the papers of Admiral Sir Philip Durham. Her latest book, a study of the sinking of HMS Royal George in 1782, has been described as "surely the definitive account of the sinking of the Royal George" and when researching it she made the original discovery that Admirals Kempenfelt and Rodney were cousins. An aspect of it was featured on the popular History Hit website.

In the 2021 Australia Day Honours, Rubinstein was awarded the Medal of the Order of Australia (OAM) for 'service to community history through a range of roles'.

== Selected works ==
=== British history ===
- Captain Luckless: James, first Duke of Hamilton (1606-49) Edinburgh, Scottish Academic Press, 1975.
- 'Jewish Emancipation', in A Reader's Guide to British History (ed. David Loades), vol. 3, London, Fitzroy Dearborn, 2003.
- Trafalgar Captain: Durham of the Defiance, Stroud, Glos., Tempus, 2005.
- Catastrophe at Spithead: The Sinking of the Royal George, Barnsley, Yorks., Seaforth, 2020.
- The Durham Papers: Selections from the Papers of Admiral Sir Philip Charles Henderson Calderwood Durham G.C.B. (1763-1845) London, Navy Records Society, 2019.
- 'Philip Charles Durham', in Nelson's Band of Brothers: Lives and Memorials (ed. Peter Hore), Barnsley, Yorks., Seaforth for The 1805 Club, 2015.
- 'Durham's Dramas: A Trafalgar Captain at the Polls', in The Trafalgar Chronicle, new series, vol.6, 2021, pp. 89–99, 214-216.
- 'Rodney and Kempenfelt: How They Were Related", in The Trafalgar Chronicle, new series, vol.8, 2023, pp. 122–29, 199-200.
- 'Trafalgar's Last Survivors', in The Trafalgar Chronicle, new series, vol.9, 2024, pp. 135-45, 215-17.

=== Jewish history ===
- The Jews in the Modern World: A History since 1750 (co-author), London and New York, Routledge, 2002.
- The Palgrave Dictionary of Anglo-Jewish History (co-author), London, Palgrave Macmillan, 2011.
- Philosemitism: Admiration and Support in the English-Speaking World for Jews, 1840-1939 (co-author), Basingstoke and New York, Macmillan, 1999.
- The Jews in Victoria, 1835-1985, Melbourne, Jewish Museum of Australia, 1985; Sydney, George Allen & Unwin, 1986.
- Chosen: The Jews in Australia, Sydney, George Allen & Unwin, 1987.
- The Jews in Australia: A Thematic History Volume One: 1788-1945, Port Melbourne, Heinemann, 1990.
- A Time to Keep. The Story of Temple Beth Israel: 1930 to 2005 (co-editor ), Melbourne: Hybrid Publishers, 2005.
- 'Australian Jewry: a brief historical overview', in When Jews and Christians Meet: Australian Essays Commemorating Twenty Years of Nostra Aetate (ed. J. W. Roffey) Melbourne, Victorian Council of Christians and Jews, 1985.
- 'From Jewish non-distinctiveness to group invisibility: Australian Jewish identity and responses, 1830–1950', in Jews in the Sixth Continent (ed. William Rubinstein), Sydney, George Allen & Unwin, 1987.
- 'Jewish Parliamentarians in Australia, 1849 to the Present', in Jews and Australian Politics (eds. G. B. Levey and P. Mendes), Brighton, Sussex Academic Press, 2004.
- 'A pioneering philosemite: Charlotte Elizabeth Tonna (1790-1846) and the Jews' ('Lady Magnus Lecture' to the Jewish Historical Society of England), Jewish Historical Studies, vol.35 (1996-1998), pp. 103–118.
- 'Early Manifestations of Holocaust Denial in Australia,' Australian Jewish Historical Society Journal, vol. 14, part 1, 1998, pp. 93–108
- 'Sir James Barrett (1862-1945): Australian Philo-Semite,' Australian Jewish Historical Society Journal, vol.12, part 1, 1993, pp. 91–100
- 'The Three State Manifestos in Support of the Kimberley Scheme, 1939-40: Texts and Signatories,' Australian Jewish Historical Society Journal, vol.15, part 1, 1999, pp. 35–58
- 'Critchley Parker (1911–42): Australian Martyr for Jewish Refugees' Australian Jewish Historical Society Journal, vol. 11, part 1, 1990, pp. 56–68
- 'William Cooper and Kristallnacht: Setting the Record Straight' Australian Jewish Historical Society Journal, vol. 24, part 1, 2018, pp. 109–142
- 'The Greatest Living Female Pianist': Florence Menkmeyer (1860-1946), a Forgotten Australian Virtuoso' Australian Jewish Historical Society Journal, vol. 24, part 3, 2019, pp. 437–467
- 'The Spanish Flu Pandemic of 1918-19 and Australian Jewry' Australian Jewish Historical Society Journal, vol. 25, part 1, 2020, pp. 158-73
- 'Melbourne's Leah Abrahams and Sons' Australian Jewish Historical Society Journal, vol. 25, part 3, 2021, pp. 425-56
- 'A Lifelong Record of Generosity: Aaron Cohen JP (1884-1960)' Australian Jewish Historical Society Journal, vol. 26, part 1, 2022, pp. 27-53
- 'The Victorian Association of British Jews' Australian Jewish Historical Society Journal, vol. 26, part 3, 2023, pp. 390-416
- 'Denouncing Denys Jackson: Jewish Responses to an anti-Israel commentator, 1947-49' Australian Jewish Historical Society Journal, vol. 27, part 1, 2024, pp. 88-113

=== Australian history ===
- Menders of the Mind: a history of the Royal Australian & New Zealand College of Psychiatrists 1946-96 (co-author), Oxford University Press, 1996.
- 'Empire loyalism in inter-war Victoria', Victorian Historical Journal, vol.70, no.1, June 1999, pp. 67–83.
- 'A gross discourtesy to His Majesty': the campaign within Australia, 1930–31, against Sir Isaac Isaacs' appointment as Governor-General', in Australian Jewish Historical Society Journal, vol.14, no.3, Nov 1998, pp. 425–58.
- 'Thomas Jerome Kingston Bakhap', in The Biographical Dictionary of the Australian Senate, vol.1, Carlton South, Vic., Melbourne University Press, 2000.
