= Percy J. Marks =

Australian Jewish solicitor and historian

Percy Joseph Marks
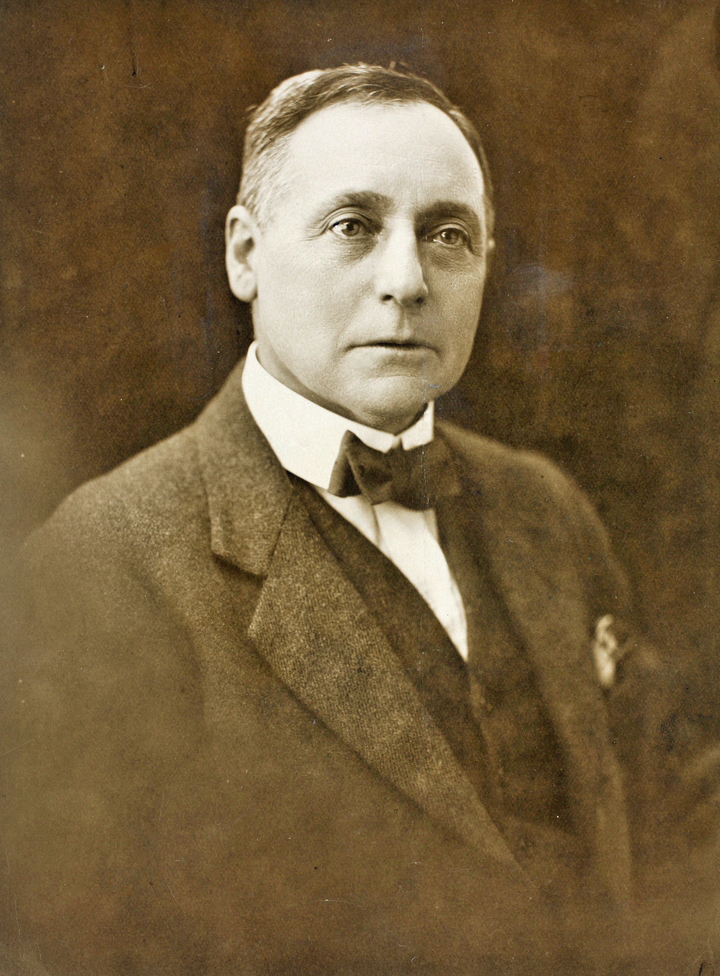
- Percy J Marks, solicitor and historian
- Born: Percy Joseph Marks; 11 December 1867; West Maitland, New South Wales
- Died: 22 June 1941 (aged 73); Kirribilli, New South Wales
- Education: Royston College, Darlinghurst; University of Sydney
- Occupation: solicitor
- Known for: historian; prominent member of Australian Jewish community

Percy Joseph Marks (11 December 1867 – 22 June 1941) was an Australian Jewish solicitor and historian.

Marks was born at West Maitland, New South Wales, the eldest son of Joseph Marks, a storekeeper and later woolbuyer born in London, and Elizabeth, daughter of Samuel Benjamin. His mother died in 1875 or 1879 and the family moved to Sydney in 1882 where Marks attended Royston College, Darlinghurst, and later, the University of Sydney. His younger brother was Ernest Samuel Marks, Lord Mayor of Sydney.

Marks was active within the Jewish community and worshipped at the Great Synagogue in Sydney. In his lifetime he was usually referred to as Percy J. Marks to avoid confusion with the Sydney jeweller Percy Marks.

He held positions in a number of Jewish organisations, including the New South Wales Board of Jewish Education, the Sydney Zionist Society, Friends of the Hebrew University in Jerusalem, the Australian Jewish Historical Society, and the Union of Junior Zionists.

He was sometime joint editor, with Sir Daniel Levy, of the New South Wales Hebrew Standard.

Percy J. Marks established a reputation for Jewish scholarship. A significant collection of Judaica gathered by him was left to the State Library of New South Wales by his brother Ernest.

Marks died at his house in Kirribilli, New South Wales. He never married.

== Positions held ==
- Honorary secretary of the New South Wales Board of Jewish Education
- In 1908, a founder and first president of the Sydney Zionist Society
- Founder and first president of the local section of the Friends of the Hebrew University in Jerusalem
- First president of the Australian Jewish Historical Society 1939–1941
- Council-member of the Royal Australian Historical Society in 1912-18
- Committee-member of the Australian Ex-Libris Society
- Committee member The Society of Australian Genealogists
- Honorary treasurer of the Numismatic Society of New South Wales
- Fellow of the Royal Colonial Institute
- Vice-president and foundation member of the New South Wales Shakespearean Society
- Joint editor of the New South Wales Hebrew Standard
- President of the Union of Junior Zionists
- Life and foundation member of the New South Wales Amateur Sports Club

== Bibliography ==
- Australasian Shakespeareana: a bibliography of books, pamphlets, magazine articles etc, that have been printed in Australia and New Zealand, dealing with Shakespeare and his works, Sydney: Tyrrell's, 1915
- Australian Judaica (1930, 1936)
- Early Jewish education in Sydney, New South Wales, Australian Jewish Historical Society Journal, Vol 1, Part 2, 1939, p. 25-42
- The first synagogue in Australia, Sydney: D.S. Ford, 1925?
- Australian Judaica: being a catalogue of books, pamphlets, etc., of Jewish interest published in Australia, in the collection of Percy J. Marks", Sydney: P.J. Marks, 1936
- The canon, text and early translations of the Bible: a paper read before the Jewish Literary and Debating Society of Sydney, Sydney: Hebrew Standard Office, 1906
- The Jewish press of Australia past and present: a paper read before the Jewish Literary and Debating Society of Sydney, Sydney: F.W. White, 1913
- Shakespeare and the Jews: a paper read before the Shakespeare Society of New South Wales, Sydney, NSW, 1916, 9 p. (Centred on The Merchant of Venice.)
