= Australian Association for Jewish Studies =

Scholarly organization in Australia

Australian Association for Jewish Studies (AAJS)
- Formation: 1987; 39 years ago
- Presidents: Anna Hirsh and Jan Lanicek
- Key people: Suzanne Rutland, Rachael Kohn, William Rubinstein, Paul R. Bartrop, Ghil'ad Zuckermann

The Australian Association for Jewish Studies (AAJS) is a scholarly organization in Australia that promotes academic Jewish Studies. AAJS was founded in 1987 and held its first annual conference that year in Melbourne. AAJS is Australia's national association for tertiary academics, Jewish educators, researchers, curators, students and others devoted to the study of any aspect of Jewish life, thought and culture.

From February 2017, the president of the association was Professor Ghil'ad Zuckermann, with vice-presidents Dr Lynne Swarts (NSW) and Dr Anna Hirsh (Victoria).

AAJS annual conferences have been held all over Australia, for example Canberra (ACT Jewish Community, 2021), Sydney (Sydney Jewish Museum, 2020, 2017; UNSW and Shalom College, 2015), Melbourne (Monash University, 2019; Deakin University, 2022), Perth (St Catherine's College, University of Western Australia, 2018), Brisbane (Griffith University, 2016) and Adelaide (The University of Adelaide, 2014).

AAJS is the publisher of the Australian Journal of Jewish Studies.

== Australian Journal of Jewish Studies ==
The Australian Journal of Jewish Studies (AJJS) is the leading journal of Jewish studies in Australia. It is an international, peer-reviewed journal published annually by the Australian Association for Jewish Studies. The Journal is devoted to the study of Jewish culture in all aspects and all periods.

The journal was founded in 1987, when it was called Menorah: Australian Journal of Jewish Studies. The current name has been used since 1991.

Journal editors

- 2025: Dr Suzanne Faigan (Editor, Reviews Editor, Publication Officer), Ms Angelica Jacob (Reviews Editor), Dr Jennifer Creese (Editor-in-Chief)
- 2023–2024: Dr Joshua Nash (Editor), Dr Suzanne Faigan (Editor, Reviews Editor, Publication Officer), Dr Jennifer Creese (Editor-in-Chief)
- 2022: Dr Jennifer Creese (Editor), Dr Jan Láníček (Editor), Dr Suzanne Faigan (Reviews Editor, Publication Officer)
- 2019–2021: Dr Jennifer Creese (Editor), Dr Jan Láníček (Editor), Dr Suzanne Faigan (Publication Officer)
- 2015–2018: Dr Vicky Schinkel (Editor), Dr Jennifer Creese (Editor)
- 2011–2014: Dr Myer Samra (Editor)
- 2002–2010: Dr Dvir Abramovich (Editor), Professor Ziva Shavitsky (Editor)
- 1997–2001: Dr Rodney Gouttman (Editor)
- 1991–1996: Dr Rachael Kohn
- 1987–1990: Dr Evan Zuesse (Founding Editor)

== Presidents of the Association ==
- Anna Hirsh and Jan Láníček (2023–)
- Ghil'ad Zuckermann (2017–2023)
- Evan Zuesse (1987–1989)
- William Rubinstein (1989–1991)
- Paul R. Bartrop (1991–1993)
- Suzanne Rutland
- Dvir Abramovich
- Michael Abrahams-Sprod

== See also ==
- History of the Jews in Australia
- Australian Jewish Historical Society
- Australian Jewish Genealogical Society
