= Sydney Jewish Museum =

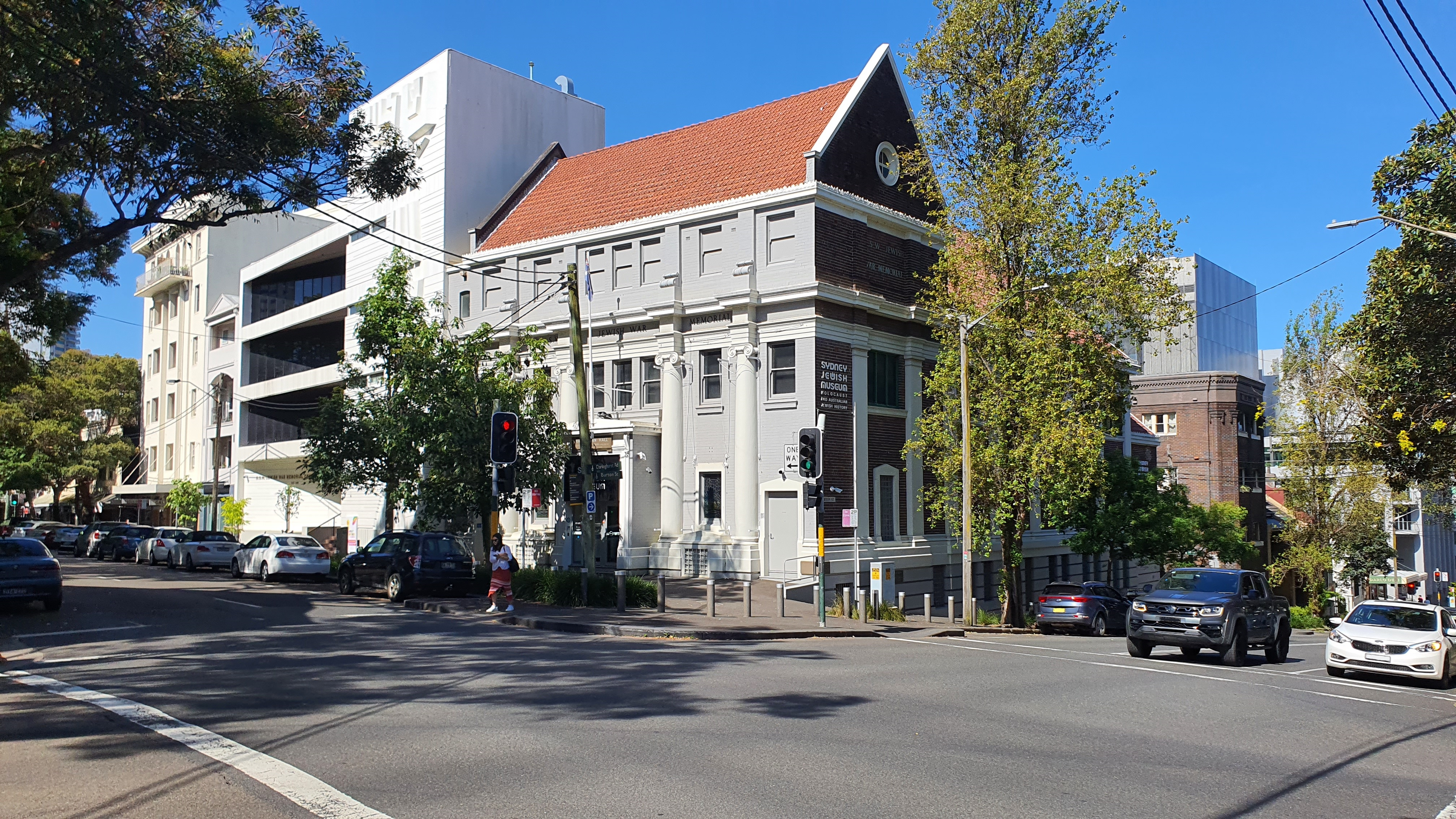
- Sydney Jewish Museum with NSW Jewish Board of Deputies on the left of it

- Location within Sydney
- Established: 18 November 1992; 33 years ago
- Location: 148 Darlinghurst Road, Darlinghurst, Sydney, New South Wales, Australia
- Coordinates: 33.879075°S 151.220017°E
- Type: Holocaust museum
- Website: sydneyjewishmuseum.com.au

The Sydney Jewish Museum is a history museum located in the Sydney suburb of Darlinghurst. It showcases exhibits relating to the Holocaust and the history and achievements of Jewish people in Australia. The Museum displays personal objects of Holocaust survivors and other Jewish Australians and hosts presentations of their personal testimonies.

The museum is currently undergoing a major redevelopment, and will be closed to the general public from January 2025 to the end of 2026. It will reopen with a new set of exhibitions and programs that will aim to showcase Jewish life and culture in Sydney.

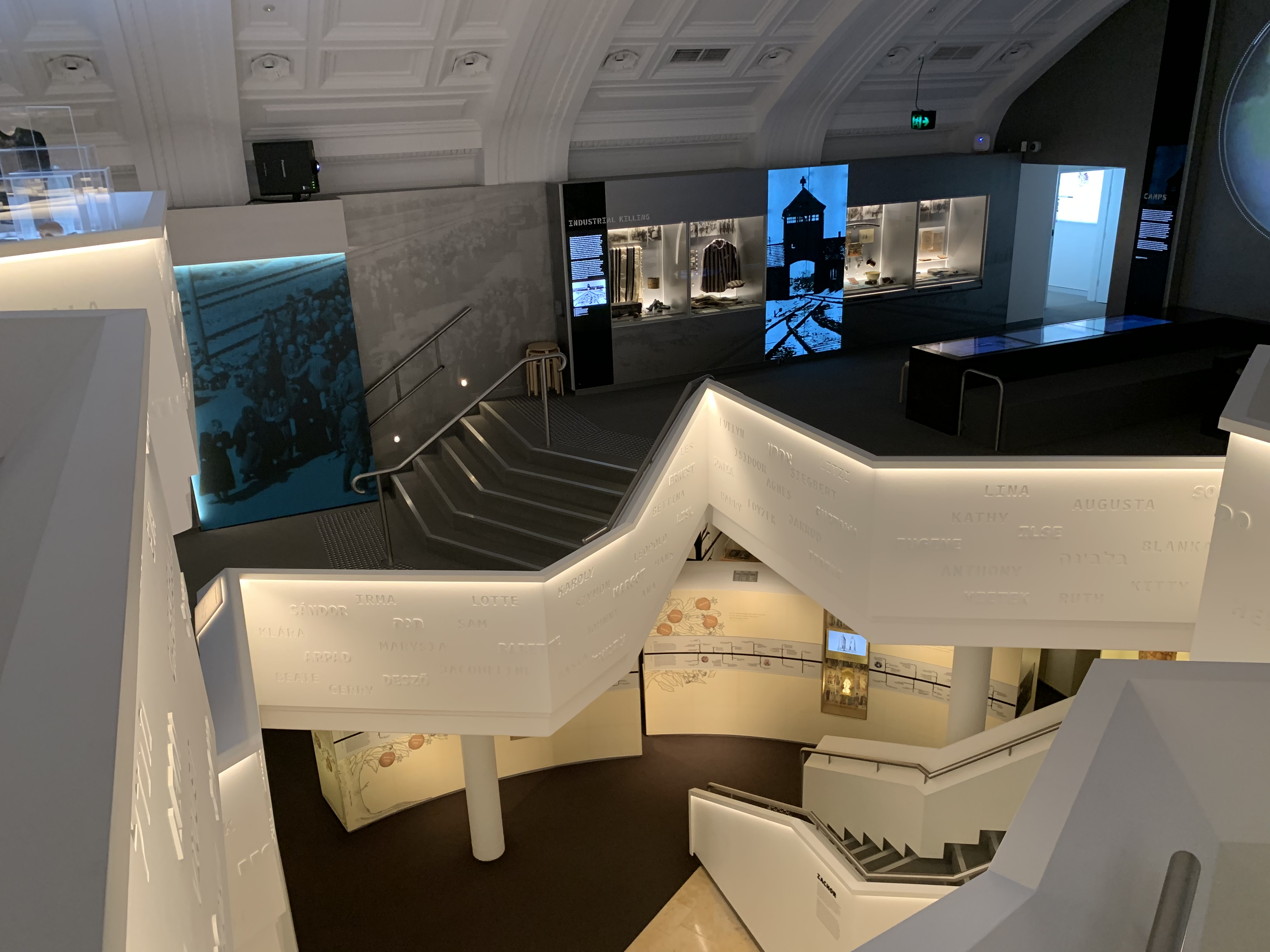
The Holocaust exhibition

== History ==
=== Prior usage of the site ===
The museum is housed in the historic Maccabean Hall, and was originally built to commemorate the contributions of the Jewish community from New South Wales who served in World War I. The building was formally opened on Armistice Day 1923 by Jewish-Australian civil engineer and Australian Army commander General Sir John Monash. Before Maccabean Hall was chosen to become the Sydney Jewish Museum, it served as a hub for Jewish life in Sydney. After World War II Maccabean Hall was employed for various uses, including migrants' English lessons, weddings, rallies, and commemorative events for Anzac soldiers and Holocaust victims.

=== Establishment ===
The Sydney Jewish Museum was established in 1992 by Holocaust survivors who came to Australia. It was officially opened by Rear Admiral Peter Sinclair, the Governor of New South Wales, on 18 November 1992. The museum was founded by the late John Saunders and members of the Australian Association of Jewish Holocaust Survivors. Australia has a higher proportion of Holocaust survivors (per capita) than any country except Israel.

=== Memorial to Bondi Beach shooting ===
In the wake of the 2025 Bondi Beach shooting, in which gunmen shot and killed 15 Jewish attendees at a Hanukkah celebration, the museum has worked to preserve artefacts from the massacre, including rescue boards used as stretchers for victims, along with flowers and plush toys placed at the site to memorialise the tragedy, as well as recording the eyewitness testimony of individuals present during the incident. Saying that the incident was "not history yet," the museum's senior curator said that the effort to gather and display the items collected was intended to provide a measure of "comfort that can be found in knowing that these stories are going to be preserved".

== Resource Centre and Library ==
The museum library was originally created from the collection of books donated by the Australian Association of Jewish Holocaust Survivors. The Resource Centre and Library comprises over 6,000 volumes, journals, and tapes, including over 2,500 personal testimonies of Holocaust survivors in Australia. The centre is open to the public during museum hours and staffed by a librarian. The collection provides materials for exhibitions and covers themes such as antisemitism, war crimes, the Holocaust in art and literature, and Australian Jewish history.

== See also ==
- Jewish Holocaust Centre
- Jewish Museum of Australia
- Australian Jews
- History of Jews in Australia
- List of Holocaust memorials and museums in Australia
- Australian Association for Jewish Studies
