= Shalom College, University of New South Wales =

Shalom College
- University of New South Wales
- Location: Kensington, New South Wales, Sydney, Australia
- Established: 1973
- Named for: Hebrew for "hello" and "peace"
- Residents: 129
- Website: http://www.shalomcollege.unsw.edu.au/

Shalom College is a residential college located on the Kensington campus of the University of New South Wales in Sydney, Australia. The College was founded in 1973 by the Jewish community of Sydney but is open to people of all faiths and backgrounds. The college is run by Shalom, a not-for-profit Jewish community organisation.

The college houses 129 local and international students, in both undergraduate and postgraduate degrees.
