= William Rubinstein =

American-British historian and author (1946–2024)

William D. Rubinstein
- Born: 12 August 1946; New York City, New York, U.S.
- Died: 1 July 2024 (aged 77)
- Spouse: Hilary L. Rubinstein

Academic background
- Education: Swarthmore College; Johns Hopkins University

Academic work
- Discipline: History
- Institutions: Lancaster University; Aberystwyth University; Deakin University; Australian National University

William David Rubinstein (12 August 1946 – 1 July 2024) was an American-British historian and author. His best-known work, Men of Property: The Very Wealthy in Britain Since the Industrial Revolution, charts the rise of the "super rich", a class he saw as expanding rapidly.

== Biography ==
William Rubinstein was born in New York City, and educated at Swarthmore College and Johns Hopkins University in the United States. His wife Hilary L. Rubinstein is also a historian.

Rubinstein died on 1 July 2024, at the age of 77.

== Academic career ==
Rubinstein worked at Lancaster University in England from 1974 to 1975, the Australian National University in Canberra during 1976–1978, Deakin University in Victoria, Australia from 1978 to 1995, and from 1995 to 2011 worked at the University of Wales, Aberystwyth which during his time there became Aberystwyth University. At Deakin he had a personal chair in history, and at Aberystwyth he was professor of history. He was an adjunct professor at Monash University in Melbourne from 2013 to 2015, and afterwards an honorary professor at Deakin University.

He was elected a Fellow of the Australian Academy of the Humanities in 1986, the Academy of the Social Sciences in Australia in 1992, and of the Royal Historical Society. Following in the footsteps of such archetypal Anglo-Jewish figures as Lucien Wolf, Israel Zangwill and Cecil Roth, he was President of the Jewish Historical Society of England from 2002 to 2004. He was the editor of the articles the Commonwealth (except Canada) in the second (2006) edition of the reference work The Encyclopaedia Judaica. He also wrote on Jews in chess for the EJ and elsewhere. He was foundation editor (1988 to 1995) of the Journal of the Australian Jewish Historical Society (Victoria). He was one of the founders of the Australian Association for Jewish Studies (established 1987), and served as its president in 1989–1991.

In Australia's Queen's Birthday Honours List 2022 he was awarded the Medal of the Order of Australia (OAM) for services to tertiary education and to Jewish history.

== Literary career ==
Rubinstein's books have been translated into Finnish, Russian, French, Hebrew, Italian, Chinese, and Japanese. He is particularly known for his research on the wealth-holding classes in modern Britain, making use of probate and other taxation records, in such works as Men of Property: The Very Wealthy in Britain Since the Industrial Revolution (1981) and Capitalism, Culture and Decline in Britain, 1750–1990 (1991; Japanese translation, 1997). He has co-authored The Richest of the Rich (2007) with Philip Beresford, an account of the 250 richest-ever people in British history since the Norman Conquest. He authored The All-Time Australian 200 Rich List (2004).

Rubinstein's books on modern Jewish history include A History of the Jews in the English-Speaking World: Great Britain (1996) and The Myth of Rescue (1997), which argues that the Allies could not have saved more Jews during the Holocaust. Holocaust historian David Cesarani called The Myth of Rescue "a polemic that will quickly fade, while the monumental scholarship it seeks to denigrate will still be consulted by historians and students for years to come." Rubinstein in return called Cesarani's views of the subject "totally lacking in historical balance or context". Arthur M. Schlesinger Jr. was impressed with the book and with Rubinstein, with whom he dined on 1 August 1996, as recorded in Schlesinger's published journals (Schlesinger, Journals 1953–2000, Penguin Press, New York, p. 799). Rubinstein has appeared in several historical documentaries on the Holocaust, including the BBC's Secrets of the Dead: Bombing Auschwitz, which premiered in the United States on the PBS network in January 2020.

Rubinstein was a regular contributor Jewish and other topics to the Australian magazine Quadrant. Calling him "a towering figure" an obituary in the Australian Jewish News noted that "Beyond academia, Rubinstein was a powerful voice in public discourse. A regular contributor to both Jewish and mainstream media, he fearlessly advocated for Jewish causes, courting controversy with his conservative political views. His intellectual curiosity, for Jewish history and culture, made him a uniquely influential figure in Australian Jewish life." (Bruce Hill, "Prominent Jewish Historian," Australian Jewish News, 11 July 2024.

Rubinstein also wrote on topics discussed by amateur historians but ignored by academics. His Shadow Pasts (2007) examines the assassination of President Kennedy, Jack the Ripper, and the Shakespeare authorship question. He also explored who wrote Shakespeare's works in a book co-authored with Brenda James, The Truth Will Out (2005), which hypothesizes that Henry Neville (c. 1562–1615), an Elizabethan Member of Parliament and Ambassador to France, was the real author of Shakespeare's works.

== Published works ==
- The Biographical Dictionary of Life Peers
- The Myth Of Rescue: Why the Democracies Could Not Have Saved More Jews from the Nazis. Routledge, 1997. ISBN 978-0-4151-2455-3
- Genocide: A History
- Britain's Century: A Social and Political History, 1815-1905 (The Arnold History of Britain)
- Men of Property: The Very Wealthy in Britain Since the Industrial Revolution
- Capitalism, Culture and Decline in Britain, 1750–1990
- A History of the Jews in the English Speaking World: Great Britain (Studies in Modern History)
- Jews in the Sixth Continent, Allen & Unwin, Sydney, 1987 (contributor and editor)
- The Jews in Australia: A Thematic History, Volume Two: 1945 to the Present, William Heinemann Australia (1991)
- Menders of the Mind: A History of the Royal Australian and New Zealand College of Psychiatrists 1946-1996 (co-author with Hilary L. Rubinstein)
- Philosemitism: Admiration and Support in the English-speaking World for Jews, 1840-1939 (co-author with Hilary L. Rubinstein)
- The Jews in the Modern World Since 1750 (co-author with Hilary L. Rubinstein, Dan Cohn-Sherbok, and Abraham J. Edelheit)
- The Richest of the Rich (co-author with Philip Beresford)
- The Left, the Right and the Jews, Croom Helm, London (1982)
- Who Were the Rich?: 1809 - 1839 v. 1: A Biographical Directory of British Wealth-holders (Several further volumes in this series are in print or preparation)
- The Truth Will Out: Unmasking the Real Shakespeare. Harper, 2006. ISBN 978-0-0611-4648-0 (co-author with Brenda James)
- Shadow Pasts: Amateur Historians and History's Mysteries. Routledge, 2007. ISBN 978-0-5825-0597-1
- Israel, the Jews and the West: The Fall and Rise of Antisemitism. Social Affairs Unit, 2008. ISBN 978-1-9048-6332-8
- The End of Ideology and the Rise of Religion: How Marxism and Other Secular Universalistic Ideologies Have Given Way to Religious Fundamentalism. Social Affairs Unit, 2009. ISBN 978-1-9048-6338-0
- The Palgrave Dictionary of Anglo-Jewish History. Palgrave Macmillan ,2011. ISBN 978-1-4039-3910-4 (co-author with Michael A. Jolles, Hilary L. Rubinstein)
- Who Wrote Shakespeare's Plays?. Amberley Publishing, 2012. ISBN 978-1-4456-0190-8
- Sir Henry Neville was Shakespeare: The Evidence. Amberley Publishing, 2016. ISBN 978-1-4456-5466-9 (co-author with John Casson)
