= Jewish Museum of Australia =

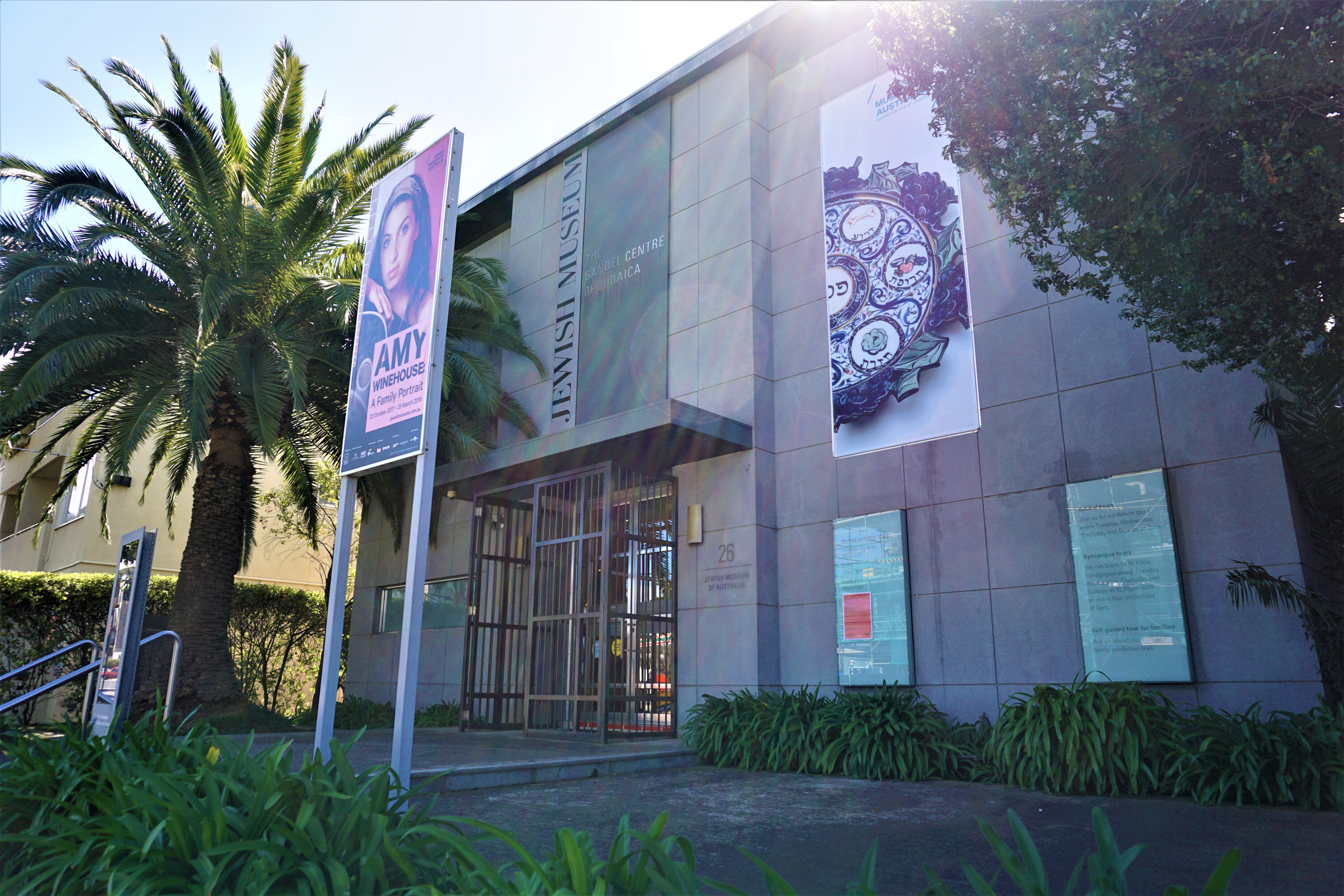
- Jewish Museum of Australia

- Location within the Melbourne area
- Established: 1977
- Coordinates: 37.8603°S 144.9855°E
- Public transit access: Tram: 3, 67 Alma Rd/St Kilda Rd
- Website: jewishmuseum.com.au

The Jewish Museum of Australia aims to "explore and share the Jewish experience in Australia". It is located in St Kilda, a suburb of Melbourne.

== History ==
The Jewish Museum of Australia was established in 1977 by a group of volunteers guided by Rabbi Ronald Lubofski. As the museum initially did not have its own premises, exhibitions were held in the Myer Gallery and the tramways Board building while a search for a location for the Museum took place. At this time the committee also began to procure items for the Museum's collection.

In 1982 the museum opened a temporary site in the abandoned classrooms of the Melbourne Hebrew Congregation in South Yarra with the patronage of Sir Zelman Cowen. The Museum remained at this location for another 13 years. During this time it held more than forty exhibitions covering a wide range of topics, some of which travelled nationally. The Museum received growing communal support and earned several distinguished industry awards.

In 1992 the Museum purchased a building on Alma Road, St Kilda, near the St Kilda Hebrew Congregation synagogue. The Museum's official opening took place on 20 August 1995, and was opened by the then Governor-General, Bill Hayden. It was named the Gandel Centre of Judaica, in honour of John and Pauline Gandel, the Museum's lead benefactors.

== Collection ==
The museum holds more than 20,000 objects, including approximately 9,000 objects from the original Rabbi Lubofski's collection. The collection comprises objects of ritual, religious, historical, cultural, social and artistic significance which encompass Jewish life and history.

The museum has exhibits on permanent display as well as temporary exhibitions. It has a number of galleries, including the Zelman Cowen Gallery of Australian Jewish History, the Gross Gallery and the Loti Smorgon Gallery.

=== Archives and Sub-collections ===
The Museum has a number of Archives and sub-collections, including,

- HMT Dunera and internment collection
- Kalman Katz Coin collection
- Schmatte Business Collection – Jews in the garment trade
- Personal family archives which document life in Europe and the migration and settlement processes
- The Jews in Shanghai before and during World War II collection
- The archives of Rabbi J. L. Gurewicz
- Charles Aisen Sculpture Collection
- Photographs and records, dating from the 19th century, documenting Jewish lives in regional Victoria

== Permanent exhibitions ==
The core of the Jewish Museum of Australia's collection is displayed across four permanent exhibitions.

=== Calling Australia Home – Zelman Cowen Gallery of Australian Jewish History ===
Located in the Zelman Cowen Gallery, this permanent exhibition features stories which tell of generations of Australian Jews. The stories give insight into the reasons for migration of Jews to Australia, the lives in which they built there and what it now means for them to be Jewish in today's Australia.

=== Timeline of Jewish history ===
A timeline which explores 4,000 years of key events in Jewish history. The exhibit comprises images, text, film, artefacts and artwork by Heather Ellyard.

=== The Jewish Year ===
An exhibition which celebrates the annual cycle of festivals and holy days that make up the rhythm and form of Jewish life. As the year unfolds in the exhibition space, a mix of objects, text and images give further insight, whilst connecting the Jewish calendar to the solar and lunar years. The collection also demonstrates the link between the Jewish festivals and the agricultural cycles of the Land of Israel.

=== Belief and Ritual ===
An exhibition examining the foundations of Judaism and the traditions and beliefs which have endured 4,000 years of history, and continue to bind Jews together.

== See also ==
- Jewish Holocaust Museum and Research Centre
- Sydney Jewish Museum
- Australian Association for Jewish Studies
