= History of Strasbourg =

Notable events in the history of Strasbourg

Strasbourg is a city in the historic Alsace region on the left bank of the Rhine. Founded by the Romans in 12 BC, the city passed under the control of the Merovingians in the eighth century, and then became part of the Holy Roman Empire. Flourishing throughout the middle ages and Renaissance, it was conquered by Louis XIV in 1681. After having changed nationality four times between 1870 and 1945, Strasbourg today is a symbol of Franco-German reconciliation and European integration. The following is a detailed history of Strasbourg, France.

== Prehistory ==
The human occupation of the environs of Strasbourg goes back many thousands of years. Neolithic, Bronze Age and Iron Age artifacts have been uncovered by archeological excavations. It was permanently settled by proto-Celts around 1300 BC. Towards the end of the third century BC, it developed into a Celtic township with a market called "Argentorate". Drainage works converted the stilthouses to houses built on dry land.

== From Romans to Renaissance ==
=== Argentoratum ===
The Romans under Nero Claudius Drusus established a military outpost belonging to the Germania Superior Roman province at Strasbourg's current location, and named it Argentoratum. (The town is commonly called Argentina in medieval Latin.) The name "Argentoratum" was first mentioned in 12 BC and the city celebrated its 2,000th birthday in 1988. "Argentorate" as the toponym of the Gaulish settlement preceded it before being Latinized, but it is not known by how long. The Roman camp was destroyed by fire and rebuilt six times between the first and the fifth centuries AD: in 70, 97, 235, 355, in the last quarter of the fourth century, and in the early years of the fifth century. It was under Trajan and after the fire of 97 that Argentoratum received its most extended and fortified shape. From the year 90 on, the Legio VIII Augusta was permanently stationed in the Roman camp of Argentoratum. It then included a cavalry section and covered an area of approximately 20 hectares. Other Roman legions temporarily stationed in Argentoratum were the Legio XIV Gemina and the Legio XXI Rapax, the latter during the reign of Nero.

The centre of Argentoratum proper was situated on the Grande Île (Cardo: current Rue du Dôme, Decumanus: current Rue des Hallebardes). The outline of the Roman "castrum" is visible in the street pattern in the Grande Ile. Many Roman artifacts have also been found along the current Route des Romains, the road that led to Argentoratum, in the suburb of Koenigshoffen. This was where the largest burial places were situated, as well as the densest concentration of civilian dwelling places and commerces next to the camp. Among the most outstanding finds in Koenigshoffen were (found in 1911–12) the fragments of a grand Mithraeum that had been shattered by early Christians in the fourth century. From the fourth century, Strasbourg was the seat of the Bishopric of Strasbourg (made an Archbishopric in 1988). Archaeological excavations below the current Église Saint-Étienne in 1948 and 1956 unearthed the apse of a church dating back to the late fourth or early fifth century, considered to be the oldest church in Alsace. It is supposed that this was the first seat of the Roman Catholic Diocese of Strasbourg.

The Alemanni fought the Battle of Argentoratum against Rome in 357. They were defeated by Julian, later Emperor of Rome, and their King Chonodomarius was taken prisoner. On 2 January 366, the Alemanni crossed the frozen Rhine in large numbers to invade the Roman Empire. Early in the fifth century, the Alemanni appear to have crossed the Rhine, conquered, and then settled what is today Alsace and a large part of Switzerland.

=== Imperial city ===
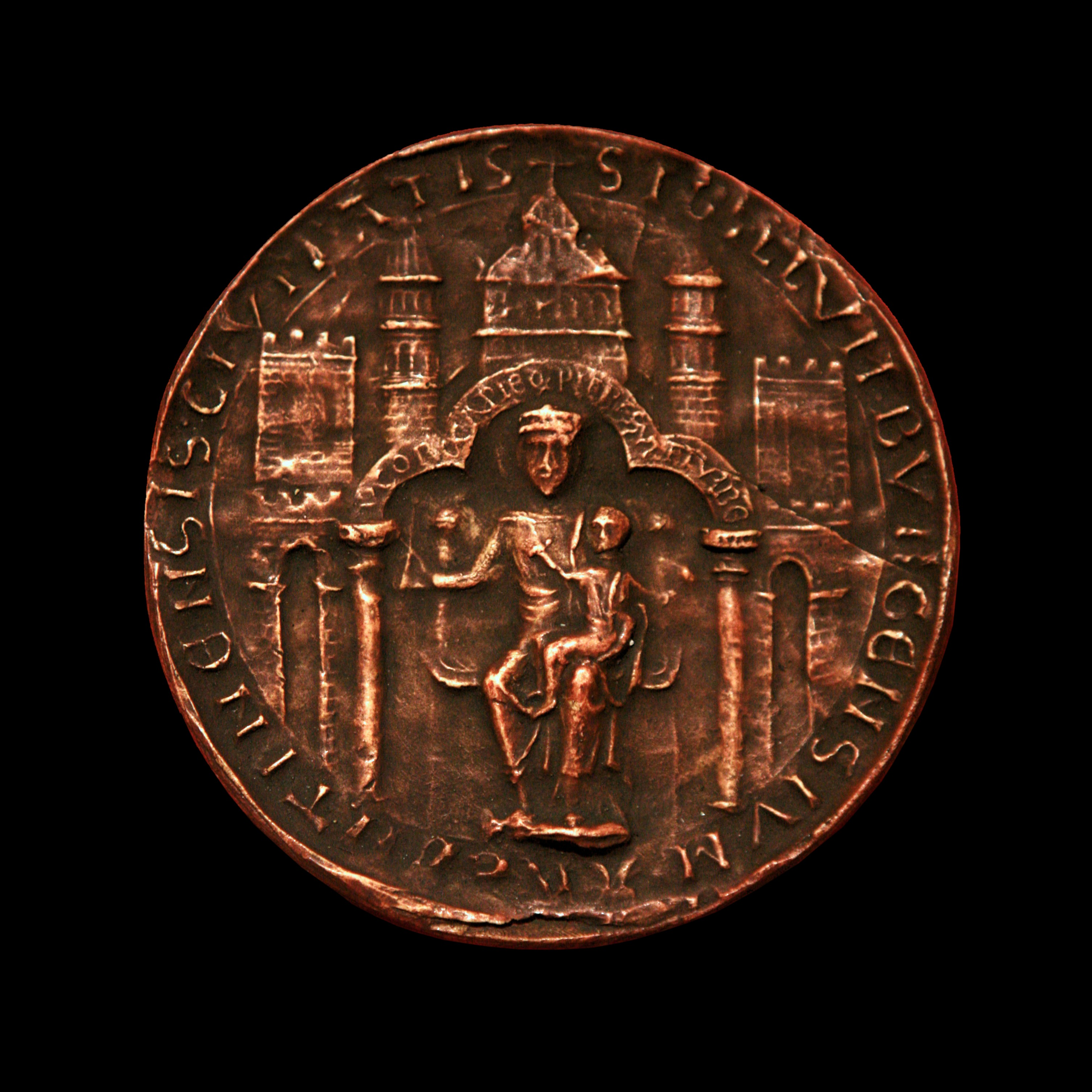
Modern copy of the seal of Strasbourg from 1201.

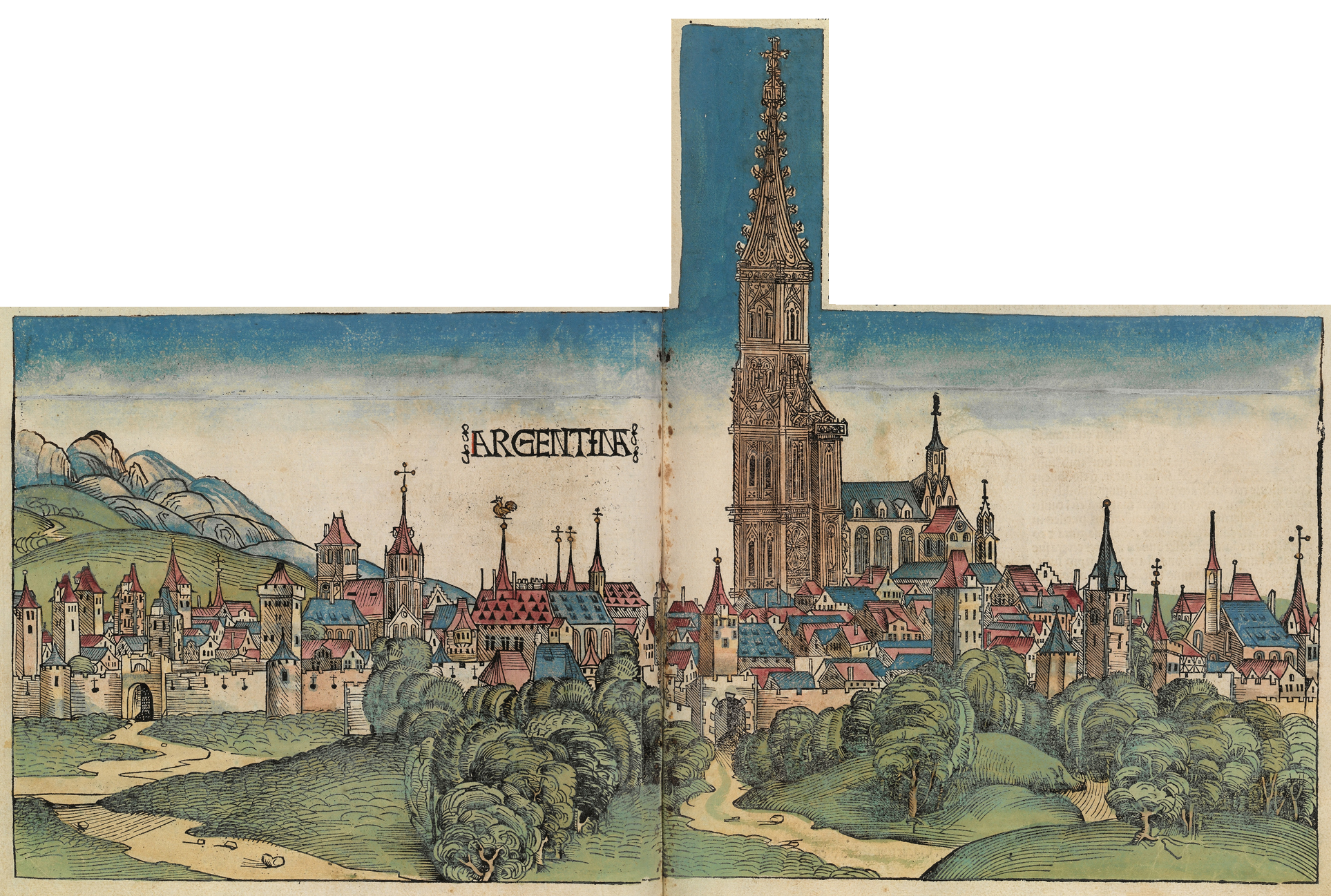
Strasbourg as seen in 1493

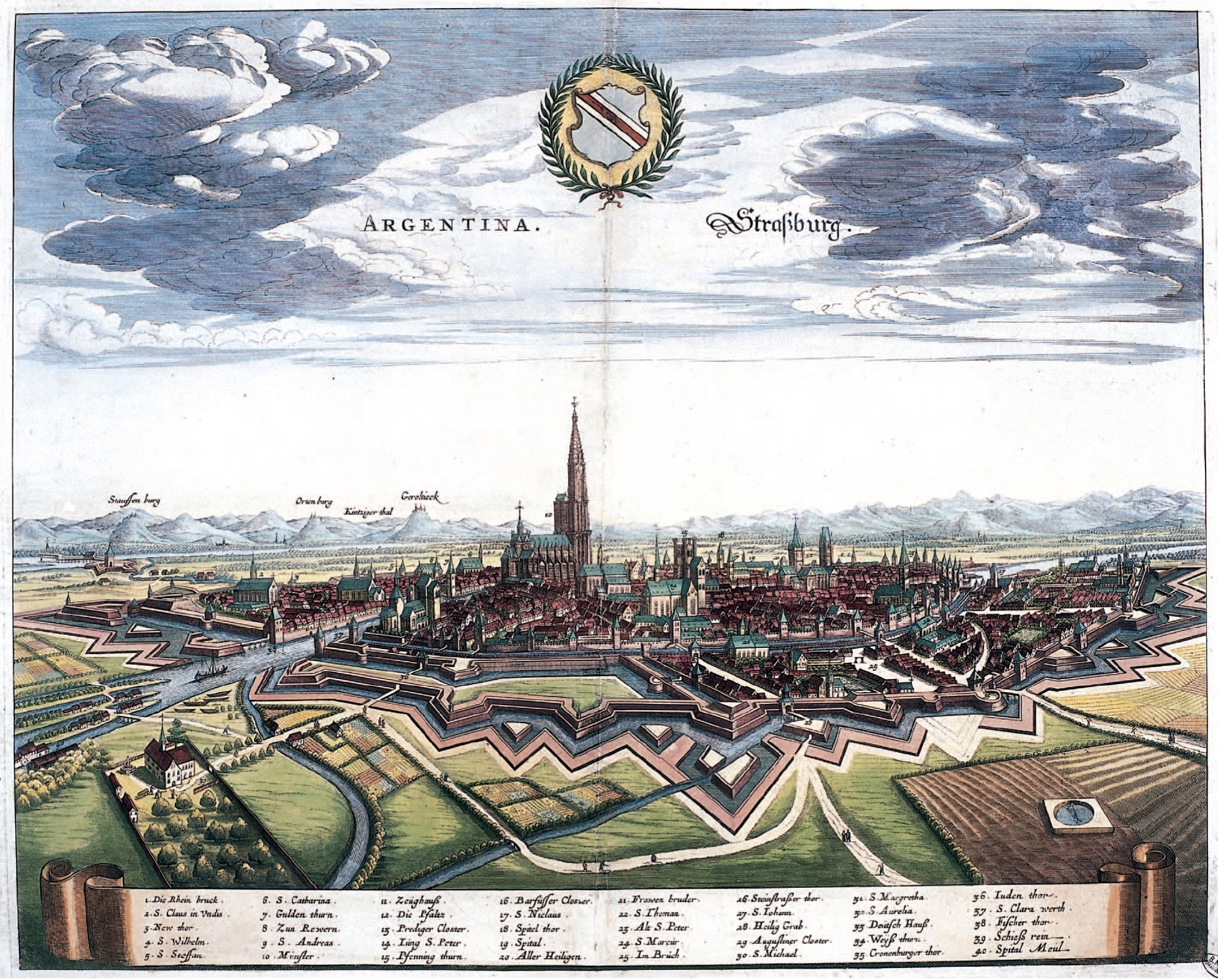
Strasbourg as seen in 1644

In the fifth century Strasbourg was occupied successively by Alemanni, Huns, and Franks. In the ninth century it was commonly known as Strazburg in the local language, as documented in 842 by the Oaths of Strasbourg. This trilingual text contains, alongside texts in Latin and Old High German (teudisca lingua), the oldest written variety of Gallo-Romance (lingua romana) clearly distinct from Latin, the ancestor of Old French. The town was also called Stratisburgum or Strateburgus in Latin, from which later came Strossburi in Alsatian and Straßburg in Standard German, and then Strasbourg in French. The Oaths of Strasbourg is considered as marking the birth of the two countries of France and Germany with the division of the Carolingian Empire.

A major commercial centre, the town came under the control of the Holy Roman Empire in 923, through the homage paid by the Duke of Lorraine to German King Henry I. The early history of Strasbourg consists of a long conflict between its bishop and its citizens. The citizens emerged victorious after the Battle of Oberhausbergen in 1262, when King Philip of Swabia granted the city the status of a free imperial city – the Imperial City of Strassburg.

Around 1200, Gottfried von Strassburg wrote the Middle High German courtly romance Tristan, which is regarded, alongside Wolfram von Eschenbach's Parzival and the Nibelungenlied, as one of great narrative masterpieces of the German Middle Ages.

A revolution in 1332 resulted in a broad-based city government with participation of the guilds, and Strasbourg declared itself a free republic. The deadly bubonic plague of 1348 was followed on 14 February 1349 by one of the first and worst pogroms in pre-modern history: several thousand Jews were publicly burnt to death. Until the end of the 18th century, Jews were forbidden to remain in town after 10 pm. The time to leave the city was signalled by a municipal herald blowing the Grüselhorn (see below, Museums, Musée historique);. A special tax, the Pflastergeld (pavement money), was furthermore to be paid for any horse that a Jew would ride or bring into the city while allowed to.

Construction on Strasbourg Cathedral began in the twelfth century, and it was completed in 1439 (though, of the towers, only the north tower was built), becoming the World's Tallest Building, surpassing the Great Pyramid of Giza. A few years later, Johannes Gutenberg created the first European moveable type printing press in Strasbourg.

Following the Imperial reform of 1500, Strassburg became part of the Upper Rhenish Circle, an administrative grouping of Imperial estates in the southwest of Holy Roman Empire, mainly responsible for maintaining troops, supervising coining, and ensuring public security.

=== Printing and humanism ===
After the invention of the movable type printing press by Johannes Gutenberg around 1440, the first printing offices outside the inventor's hometown Mainz were established around 1460 in Strasbourg by pioneers Johannes Mentelin and Heinrich Eggestein. Subsequently, the first modern newspaper was published in Strasbourg in 1605, when Johann Carolus received the permission by the City of Strasbourg to print and distribute a weekly journal written in German by reporters from several central European cities. Printing created environment favorable for humanism, with thinkers such as Jakob Wimpheling, Johann Geiler von Kaisersberg and Sébastien Brant; by pointing out ecclesiastical abuses, they prepared the ground for Protestantism.

In July 1518, an incident known as the dancing plague of 1518 struck residents of Strasbourg. Around 400 people were afflicted with dancing mania and danced constantly for weeks, most of them eventually dying from heart attack, stroke or exhaustion. In 1519, the theses of Martin Luther were attached to the door of the cathedral, and the directors of the city, especially Jacob Sturm von Sturmeck welcomed the change.

=== Protestant Reformation ===
In the 1520s during the Protestant Reformation, the city, under the political guidance of Jacob Sturm von Sturmeck and the spiritual guidance of Martin Bucer embraced the religious teachings of Martin Luther. Their adherents established a Gymnasium, headed by Johannes Sturm, made into a University in the following century. The city first followed the Tetrapolitan Confession, and then the Augsburg Confession. Protestant iconoclasm caused much destruction to churches and cloisters, notwithstanding that Luther himself opposed such a practice.

The Strasbourg Councillor Sturm and guildmaster Matthias represented the city at the Imperial Diet of Speyer (1529), where their protest led to the schism of the Catholic Church and the evolution of Protestantism. Together with four other free cities, Strasbourg presented the confessio tetrapolitana as its Protestant book of faith at the Imperial Diet of Augsburg in 1530, where the slightly different Augsburg Confession was also handed over to Charles V, Holy Roman Emperor.

John Calvin came to Strasbourg in 1538 after being expelled from Geneva, and was active as a minister until returning there in 1541; he was not attached to one particular church, but held his office successively in the Saint-Nicolas Church, the Sainte-Madeleine Church and the former Dominican Church (now the Temple Neuf). During this time he worked on the second edition of the Institutes and in 1539 published the first edition of his Psalter, Aulcuns Pseaulmes et cantiques mys en chant (Some rhymed Psalms and Hymns to be sung) which contained 18 psalms and hymns set to music. Most of the melodies were familiar tunes used in the German church, others were composed by Wolfgang Dachstein (the organist at St Thomas' Church or Matthias Greiter of the Collegium Argentinense.

Other early Reformers active in Strasbourg include Wolfgang Capito (†1541), Matthew (†1548) and Katharina Zell (†1562).

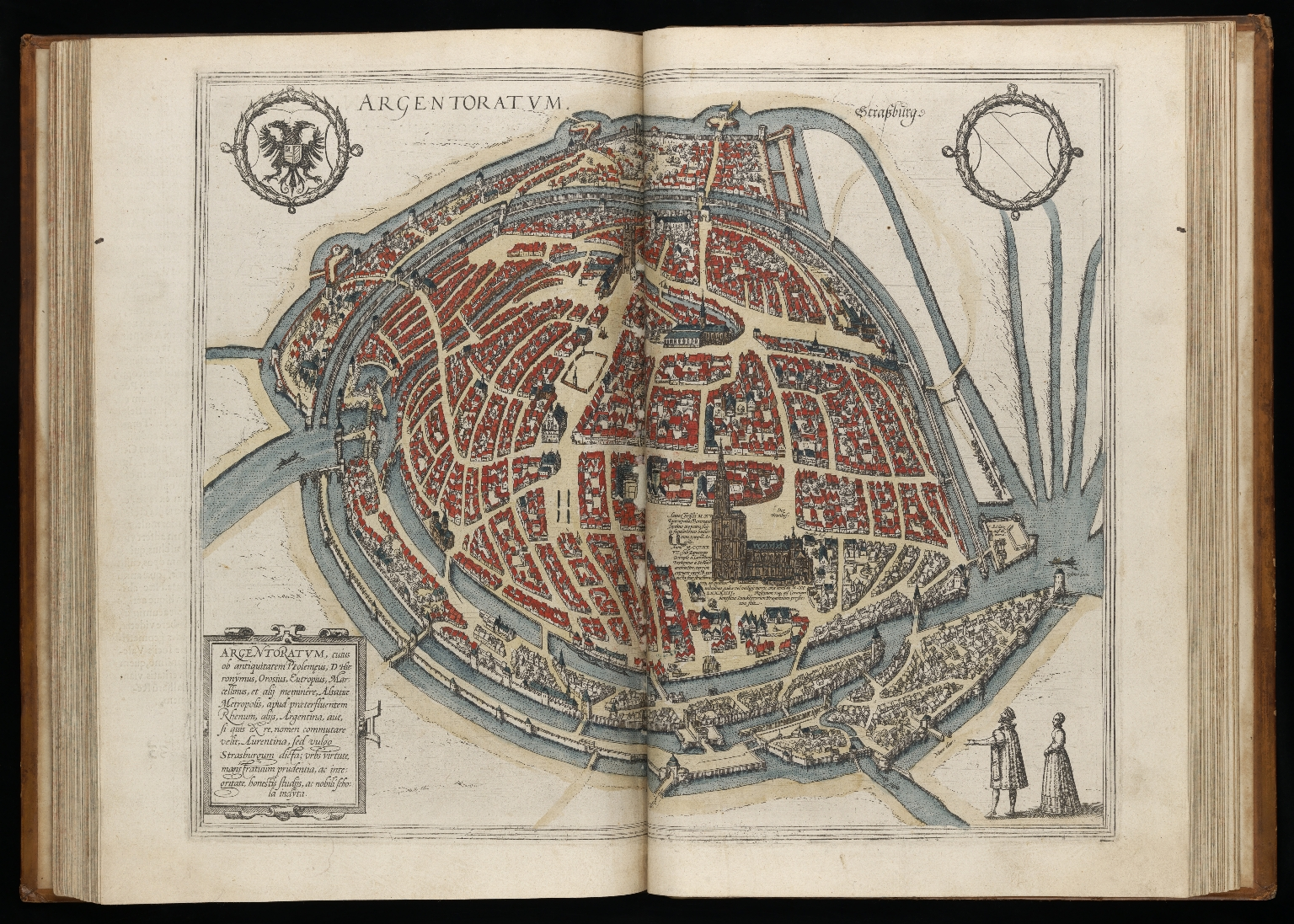
Bird’s eye perspective in plan form of Argentoratum (Strasbourg). 1540.

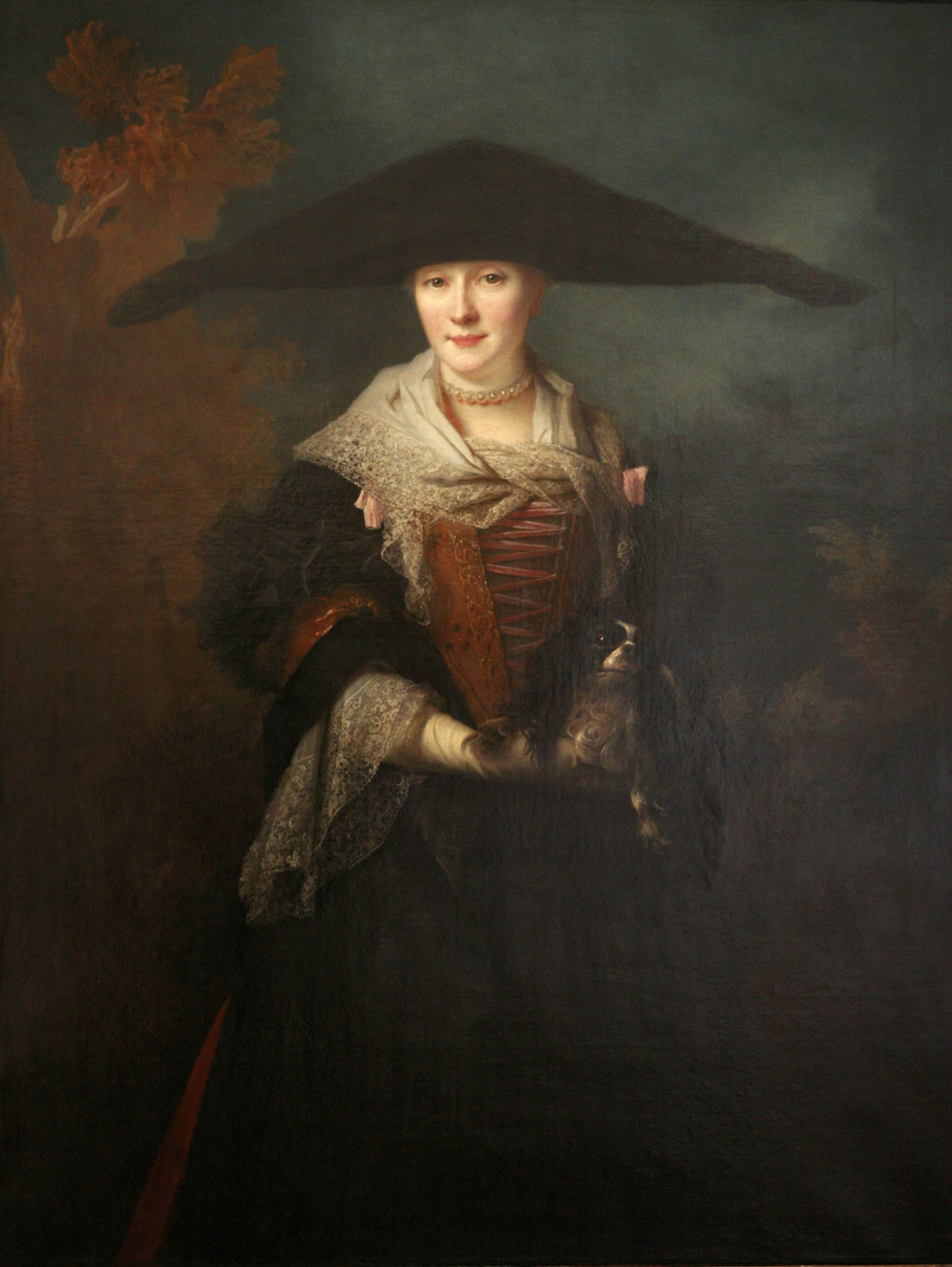
La belle Strasbourgeoise, by Nicolas de Largillière, 1703: elements of tracht and French fashions worn with aplomb, embody the independent culture of Strasbourg's high bourgeoisie

== Thirty Years' War ==
The Free City of Strasbourg remained neutral during the Thirty Years' War (1618–1648), and retained its status as a Free Imperial City. However, the city was later annexed by Louis XIV of France to extend the borders of his kingdom. Louis' advisors believed that, as long as Strasbourg remained independent, it would endanger the King's newly annexed territories in Alsace, and, that to defend these large rural lands effectively, a garrison had to be placed in towns such as Strasbourg. Indeed, the bridge over the Rhine at Strasbourg had been used repeatedly by Imperial (Holy Roman Empire) forces, and three times during the Franco-Dutch War Strasbourg had served as a gateway for Imperial invasions into Alsace. In September 1681 Louis' forces, though lacking a clear casus belli, surrounded the city with overwhelming force. After some negotiation, Louis marched into the city unopposed on 30 September 1681 and proclaimed its annexation.

This annexation was one of the direct causes of the brief and bloody War of the Reunions whose outcome left the French in possession. The French annexation was recognized by the Treaty of Ryswick (1697). The official policy of religious intolerance which drove most Protestants from France after the revocation of the Edict of Nantes in 1685 was not applied in Strasbourg and in Alsace, because both had a special status as a province à l'instar de l'étranger effectif (a kind of foreign province of the king of France). Strasbourg Cathedral, however, was taken from the Lutherans to be returned to the Catholics as the French authorities tried to promote Catholicism wherever they could (some other historic churches remained in Protestant hands). Its language also remained overwhelmingly German: the German Lutheran university persisted until the French Revolution. Famous students included Goethe and Herder. The world's first school for midwives was opened in Strasbourg in 1728.

Contemporary observers have estimated that only 1% of Straßburg's population spoke French.

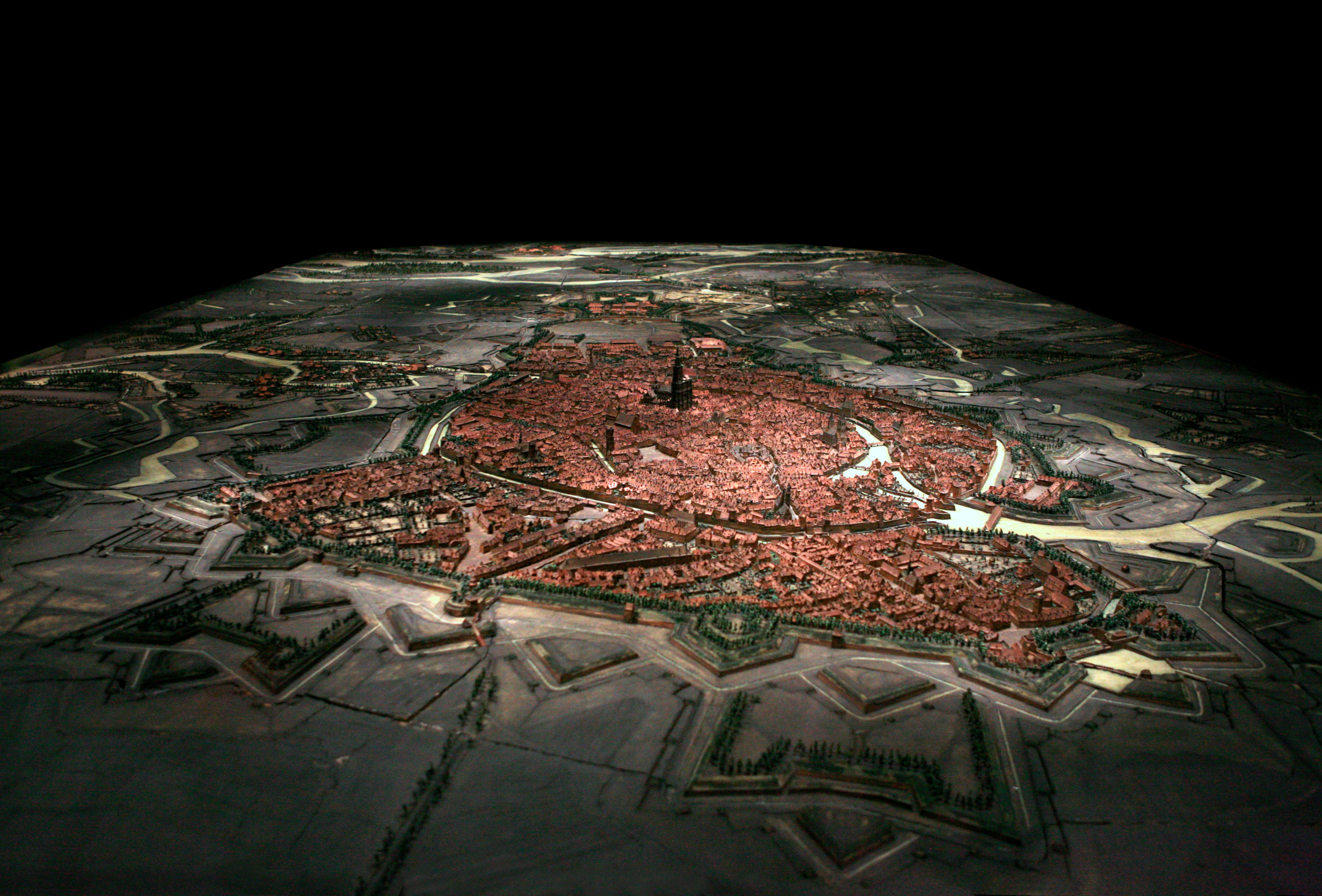
Plan-relief of Strasbourg, one of the 1:600 scale models requested by Louis XIV. On display at Strasbourg historical museum

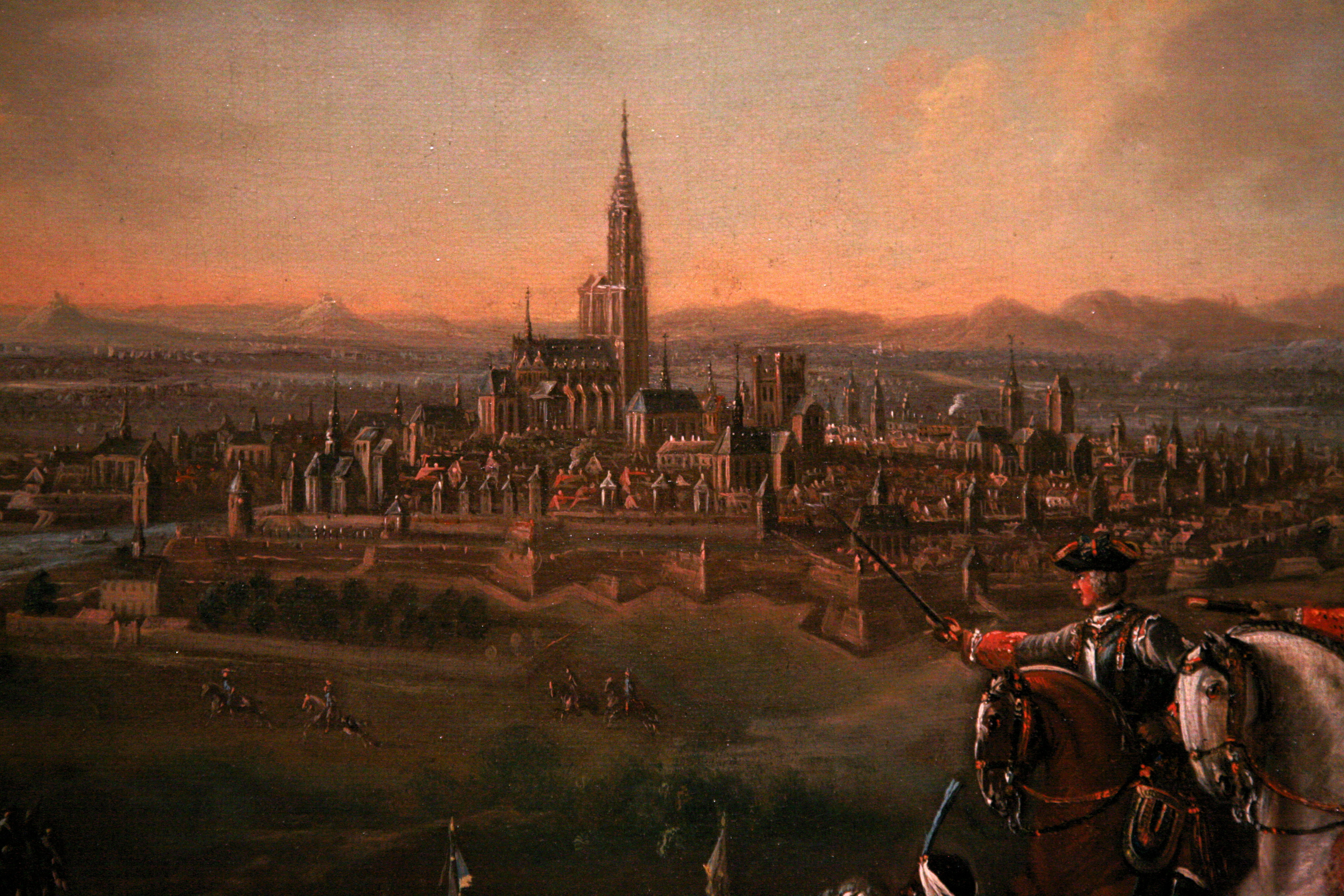
The Duke of Lorraine and Imperial troops crossing the Rhine at Strasbourg during the War of the Austrian Succession, 1744

In linguistic terms, proponents of the French revolution demanded from Alsacians, like from East-Lorrainians, a confession to French over their native German, which was disparaged, varyingly, as the language of the enemy, language of feudalism, language of slaves, and was mandated to disappear as all kinds of French patois different from Parisian French. The Hôtel de Hanau was completed in 1736.

== French Revolution and "La Marseillaise" ==
News of the Storming of the Bastille on July 14, 1789 spread quickly. On July 21, the city hall was sacked. Strasbourg lost certain possessions, such as the towns of Wasselonne and Barr. In 1790 the property of the clergy was seized, and the university (Lutheran at the time), lost most of its revenues.

Things quickly settled down until 1792, when France went to war against Prussia and Austria. During a dinner in Strasbourg organized by Mayor Frédéric de Dietrich on 25 April 1792, Claude Joseph Rouget de Lisle composed "War Song for the Army of the Rhine" (Chant de guerre pour l'Armée du Rhin), which was later renamed "La Marseillaise". The same year François Christophe Kellermann, a child of Strasbourg was appointed the head of the Mosel Army. He led his company to victory at the battle of Valmy and saved the young French republic. He was later appointed Duke of Valmy by Napoléon in 1808.

During this period, Jean-Baptiste Kléber, also born in Strasbourg, led the French army to win several decisive victories. A statue of Kléber now stands in the centre of the city, at Place Kléber, and he is still one of the most famous French officers.

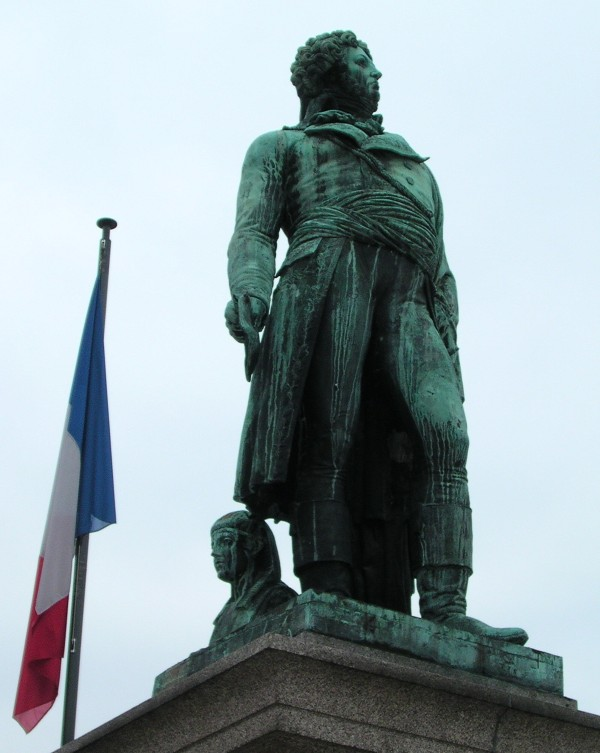
Statue of Kléber at Strasbourg

The mayor of Strasbourg, Philippe-Frédéric de Dietrich, was decapitated by guillotine in December 1793. Women were not allowed to wear traditional costumes and Christian worship was forbidden.

Strasbourg's status as a free city was revoked by the French Revolution. Enragés, such as Eulogius Schneider, ran the city. During this time, many churches and monasteries were either destroyed or severely damaged. The cathedral lost hundreds of its statues (later replaced by copies in the 19th century) and in April 1794, there was talk of tearing its spire down, on the grounds that it was against the principle of equality. The tower was saved, however, when in May of the same year citizens of Strasbourg crowned it with a giant tin Phrygian cap. This artifact was later kept in the historical collections of the city until it was destroyed in 1870 during the Franco-Prussian war.

In 1797 the French army captured many German cities, including Kehl and Offenburg, which put Strasbourg out of danger, but the Revolution had profoundly disorganized the city.

== Economic growth under Napoleon ==
At the end of 1799, Napoléon Bonaparte seized power and issued orders that established prefectures, a commodity market (1801), and a chamber of commerce in 1801. A new bridge was built over the Rhine and the road were repaired. All of these developments aided in the rapid growth of commercial activities.

In 1805, 1806 and 1809, Napoleon and his first wife, Joséphine, stayed in Strasbourg. In 1810, his second wife Marie Louise, Duchess of Parma spent her first night on French soil in the palace. Another royal guest was King Charles X in 1828. In 1836, Louis-Napoléon Bonaparte unsuccessfully tried to lead his first Bonapartist Strasbourg Coup in the city.

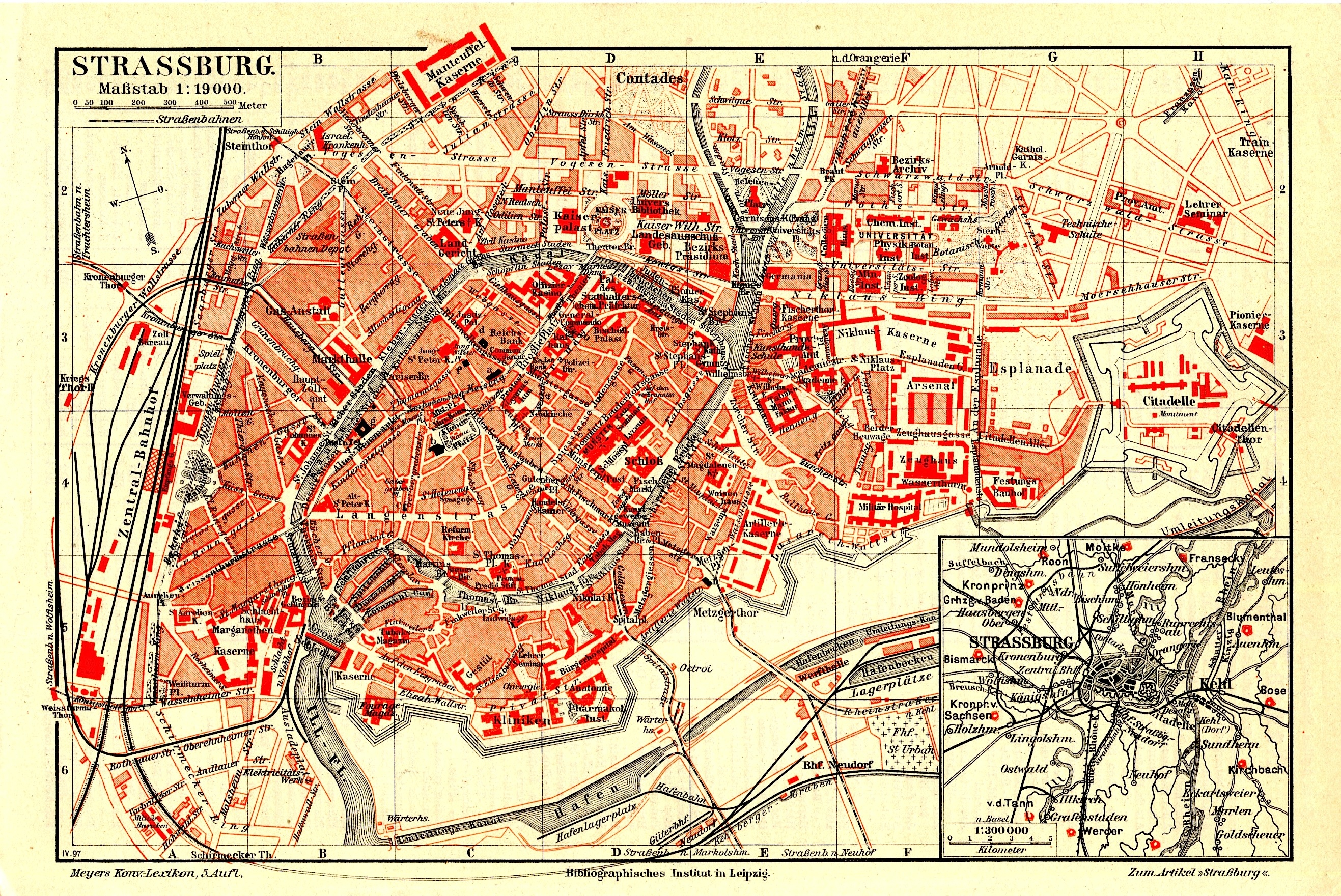
1888 German map of Strasbourg as part of the German Empire

With the growth of industry and commerce, the city's population tripled in the 19th century to 150,000.

== German Empire ==
During the Franco-Prussian War and the Siege of Strasbourg, the city was heavily bombarded by the Prussian army. The bombardment of the city was meant to break the morale of the people of Strasbourg. On 24 and 26 August 1870, the Museum of Fine Arts was destroyed by fire, as was the Municipal Library housed in the Gothic former Dominican church, with its unique collection of medieval manuscripts (most famously the Hortus deliciarum), rare Renaissance books, archeological finds and historical artifacts. The gothic cathedral was damaged as well as the medieval church of Temple Neuf, the theatre, the city hall, the court of justice and many houses. At the end of the siege 10,000 inhabitants were left without shelter; over 600 died, including 261 civilians, and 3200 were injured, including 1,100 civilians.

In 1871, after the end of the war, the city was transferred to the newly established German Empire as the capital city of Reichsland Elsass-Lothringen under the terms of the Treaty of Frankfurt. As part of Imperial Germany, Strasbourg was rebuilt and developed on a grand and representative scale, such as the Neue Stadt, or "new city" around the present Place de la République. Historian Rodolphe Reuss and Art historian Wilhelm von Bode were in charge of rebuilding the municipal archives, libraries and museums. The University, founded in 1567 and suppressed during the French Revolution as a stronghold of German sentiment, was reopened in 1872 under the name Kaiser-Wilhelms-Universität.

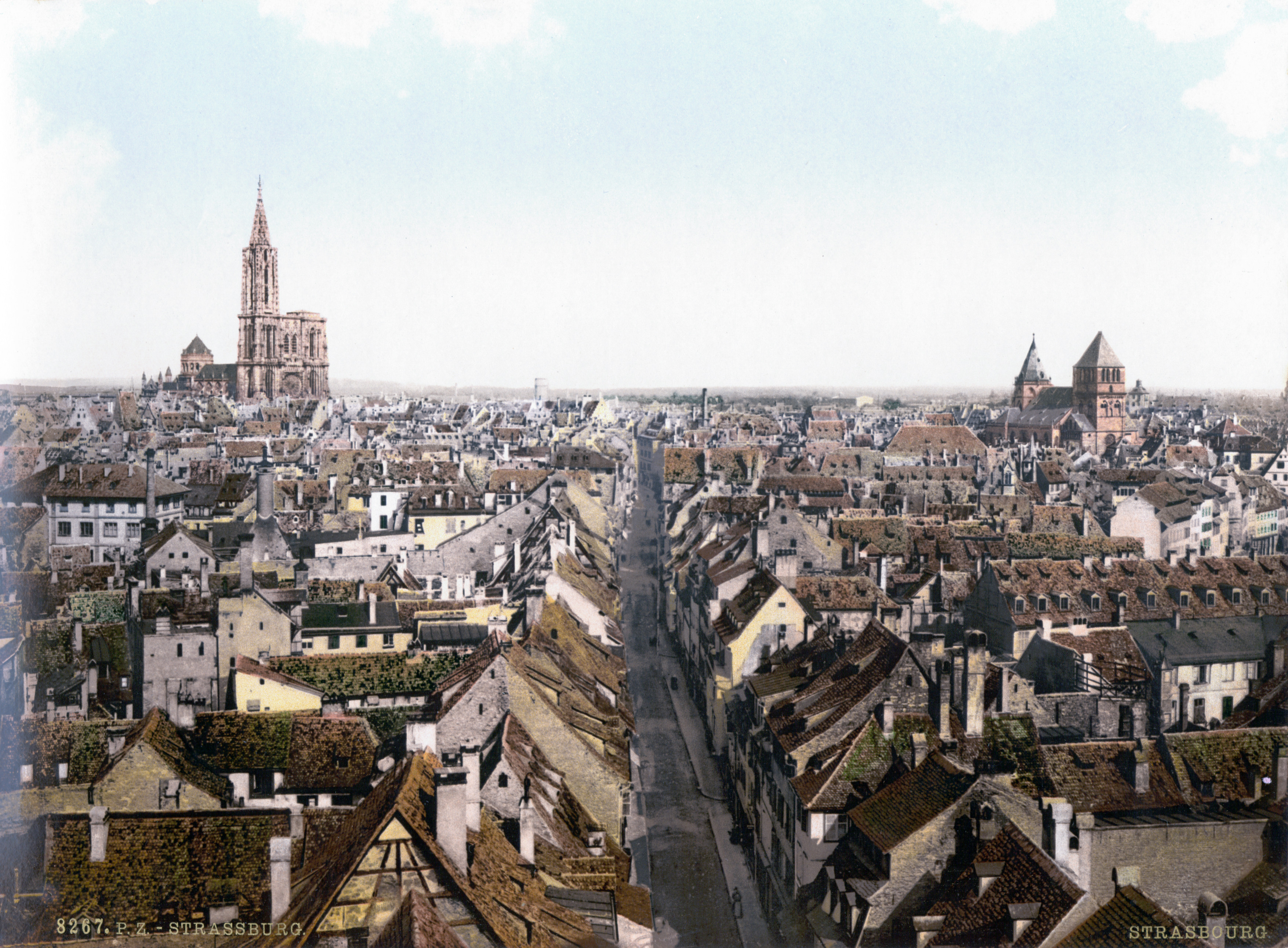
Strasbourg in the 1890s.

A belt of massive fortifications was established around the city, most of which still stands today, renamed after French generals and generally classified as Monuments historiques; most notably Fort Roon (now Fort Desaix) and Fort Podbielski (now Fort Ducrot) in Mundolsheim, Fort von Moltke (now Fort Rapp) in Reichstett, Fort Bismarck (now Fort Kléber) in Wolfisheim, Fort Kronprinz (now Fort Foch) in Niederhausbergen, Fort Kronprinz von Sachsen (now Fort Joffre) in Holtzheim and Fort Großherzog von Baden (now Fort Frère) in Oberhausbergen.

Those forts subsequently served the French Army (Fort Podbielski/Ducrot for instance was integrated into the Maginot Line), and were used as POW-camps in 1918 and 1945.

Two garrison churches were also erected for the members of the Imperial German army, the Lutheran Église Saint-Paul and the Roman Catholic Église Saint-Maurice.

== Interwar years (1918–1939) ==
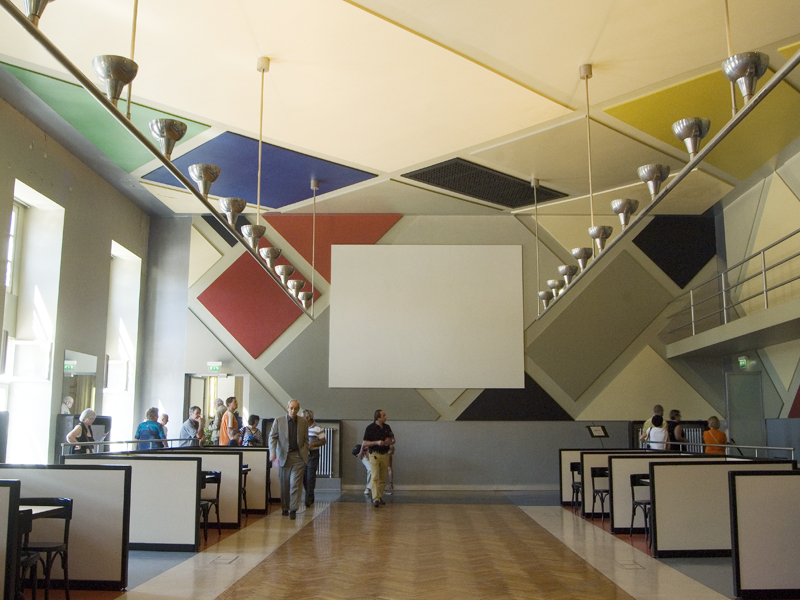
A lost, then restored, symbol of modernity in Strasbourg : a room in the Aubette building designed by Theo van Doesburg, Hans Arp and Sophie Taeuber-Arp.

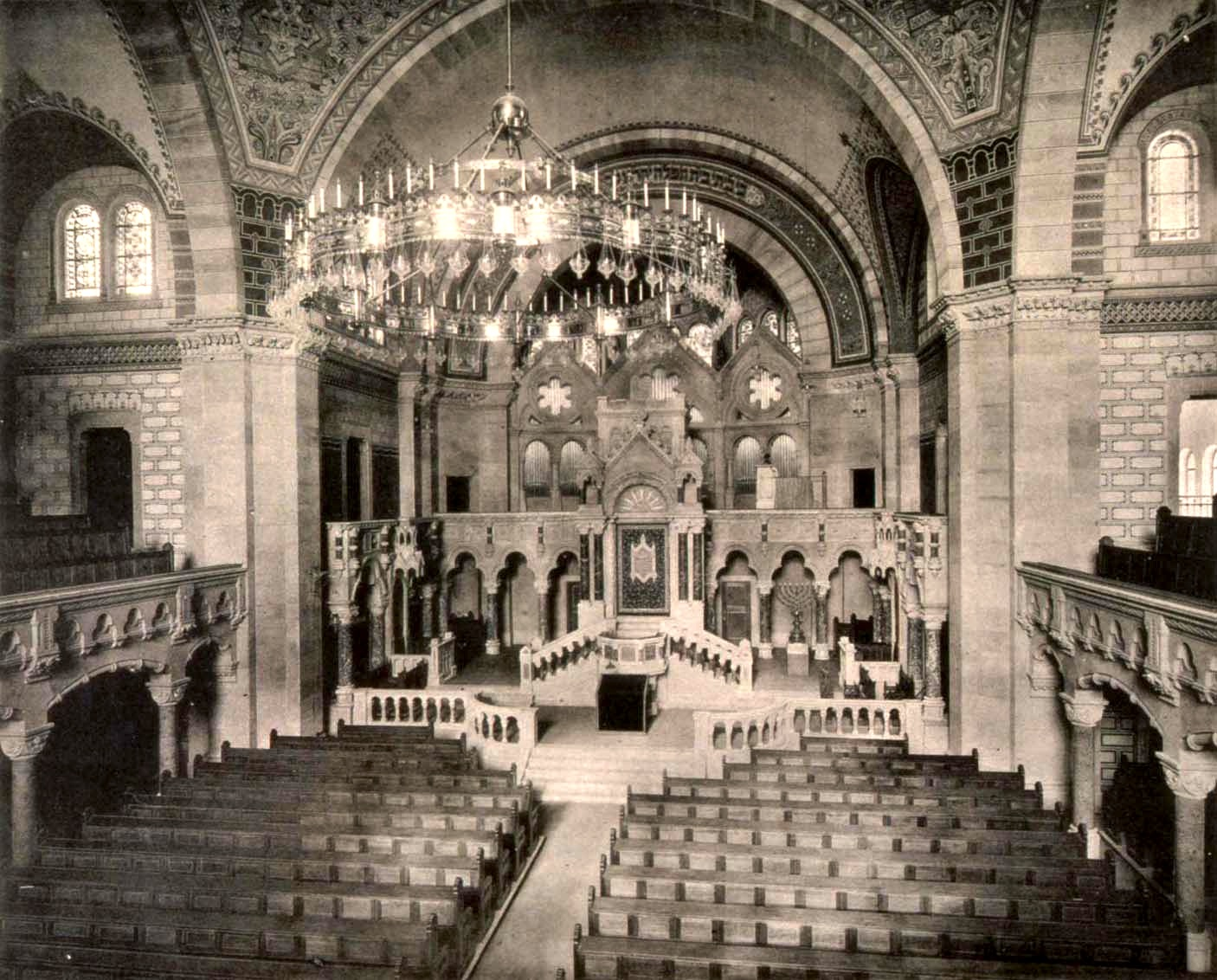
Strasbourg's monumental Romanesque Revival synagogue did not survive the Nazi German occupation of the city.

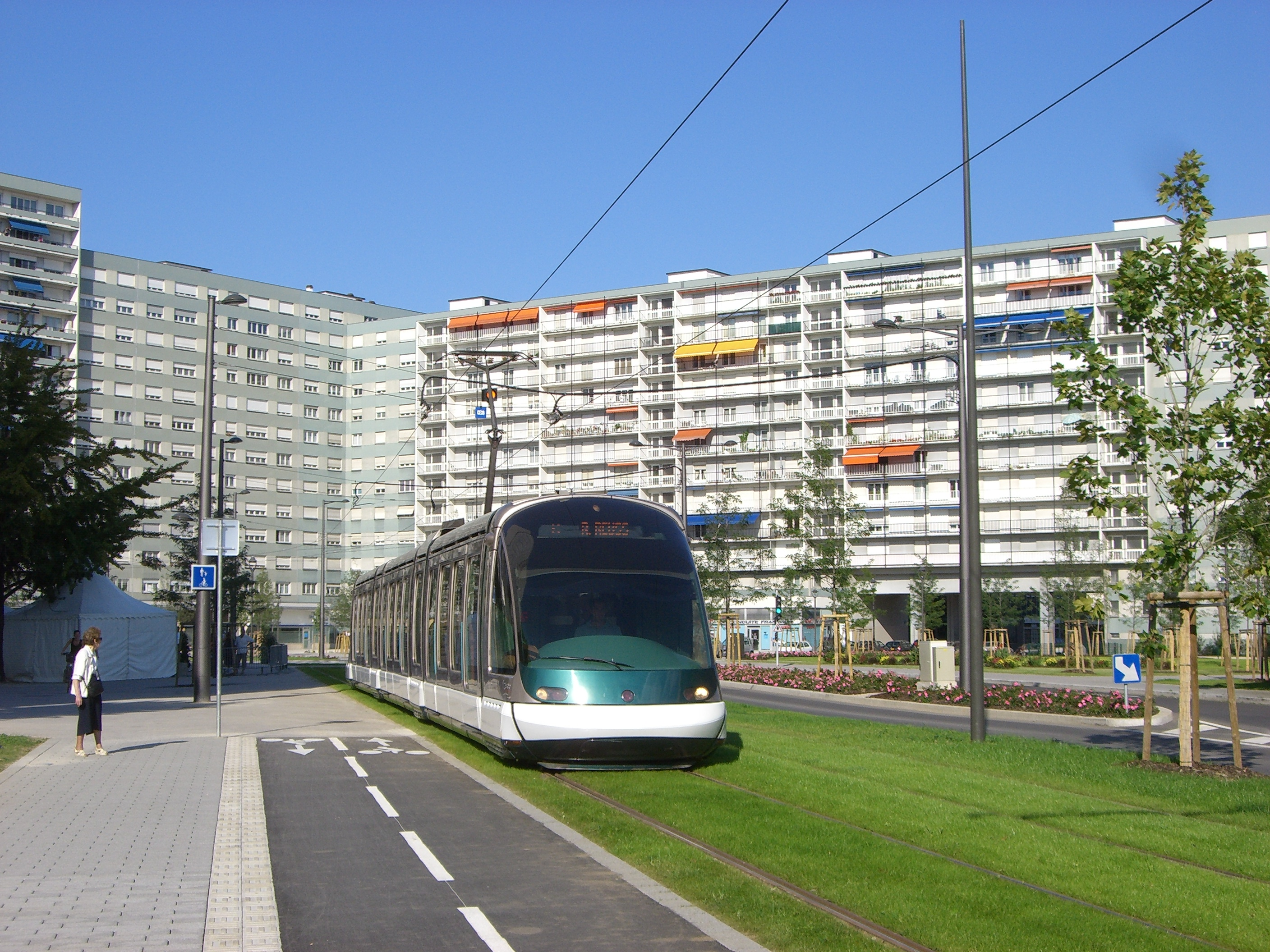
Post-war and contemporary Strasbourg: The Quartier de l'Esplanade (1950s) and a tramway (from 1994).

Following the defeat of the German empire in World War I and the abdication of the German Emperor, some revolutionary insurgents declared Alsace-Lorraine as an independent Republic, without preliminary referendum or vote. On 11 November 1918 (Armistice Day), communist insurgents proclaimed a "soviet government" in Strasbourg, following the example of Kurt Eisner in Munich as well as other German towns. French troops commanded by French general Henri Gouraud entered triumphantly in the city on 22 November. A major street of the city now bears the name of that date (Rue du 22 Novembre) which celebrates the entry of the French military in the city. Viewing the massive cheering crowd gathered under the balcony of Strasbourg's town hall, French President Raymond Poincaré stated that "the plebiscite is done".

In 1919, following the Treaty of Versailles, the city was annexed by France in accordance with U.S. President Woodrow Wilson's "Fourteen Points" without a referendum. The date of the assignment was retroactively established on Armistice Day. Germans were expelled from the city and certain imperial monuments were destroyed, notably the statue of German Emperor William I. The French system of central government control posed several problems. The Strasbourgeois were overwhelmingly speakers of the Alsatian dialect (90%), and wished to maintain their local laws. This period favored the rise of new political movements such as the communists and the autonomists.

In 1920, Strasbourg became the seat of the Central Commission for Navigation on the Rhine, previously located in Mannheim, one of the oldest European institutions. It moved into the former Imperial Palace. Thanks to the river traffic, the city regained a certain prosperity, which helped cushion the economic crisis of the 1930s. The autonomous port and rail links favored the development of industry, and in 1932 a new bourse was built. Several public housing projects were constructed during the late 1920s to accommodate the rising tide of workers, particularly the projects of Jules Siegfried, Louis Loucher and Alexandre Ribot. During the 1930, the population swelled with the arrival of Central European Jews, accompanied by a rise in antisemitism.

The central government also worked to develop the University of Strasbourg. Two historians, Marc Bloch and Lucien Febvre founded the Annales. Histoire, Sciences Sociales in 1929, giving rise to the Annales school of historiography that stresses long-term social history. Numerous foreign students attended the university, generally from central Europe and the Balkans.

The political parties striving for an autonomous Alsace or a connection to France accounted only for a small proportion of votes in the last Reichstag, as well as in the local elections. Pro-French Alsatian autonomists had won many votes in the more rural parts of the region and other towns since the 1871 German annexation. The movement started with the first election for the Reichstag; those elected were called "les députés protestataires", and until the fall of Bismarck in 1890, they were the only deputies elected by the Alsatians to the German parliament demanding the return of those territories to France. At the last Reichstag election in Strasbourg and its periphery, the clear winners were the Social Democrats; the city was the administrative capital of the region, was inhabited by many Germans appointed by the central government in Berlin, and its flourishing economy attracted many Germans. This could explain the difference between the rural vote and the one in Strasbourg. After the war, many Germans left Strasbourg and returned to Germany; some of them were denounced by the locals or expelled by the newly appointed authorities. The Saverne Affair remains vivid in the memory of many Alsatians.

When the Maginot Line was built, the Sous-secteur fortifié de Strasbourg (fortified sub-sector of Strasbourg) was laid out on the city's territory as a part of the Secteur fortifié du Bas-Rhin, one of the sections of the Line. Blockhouses and casemates were built along the Grand Canal d'Alsace and the Rhine in the Robertsau forest and the port.

== Second World War ==
Between the German invasion of Poland on 1 September 1939 and the Anglo-French declaration of War against the German Reich on 3 September 1939, the entire city (a total of 120,000 people) was evacuated, like other border towns as well. Until the arrival of the German Wehrmacht troops in mid-June 1940, the city was, for ten months, empty, except for the garrisoned soldiers. The Jews of Strasbourg had been evacuated to Périgueux and Limoges, the University had been evacuated to Clermont-Ferrand.

After the ceasefire following the Fall of France in June 1940, Alsace was annexed by Germany and a rigorous policy of Germanisation was imposed upon it by the Gauleiter Robert Heinrich Wagner. When, in July 1940, the first evacuees were allowed to return, only residents of Alsatian origin were admitted. The last Jews were deported on 15 July 1940 and the main synagogue, a huge Romanesque Revival building that had been a major architectural landmark with its 54 m (177 ft) dome since its completion in 1898, was set ablaze, then razed.

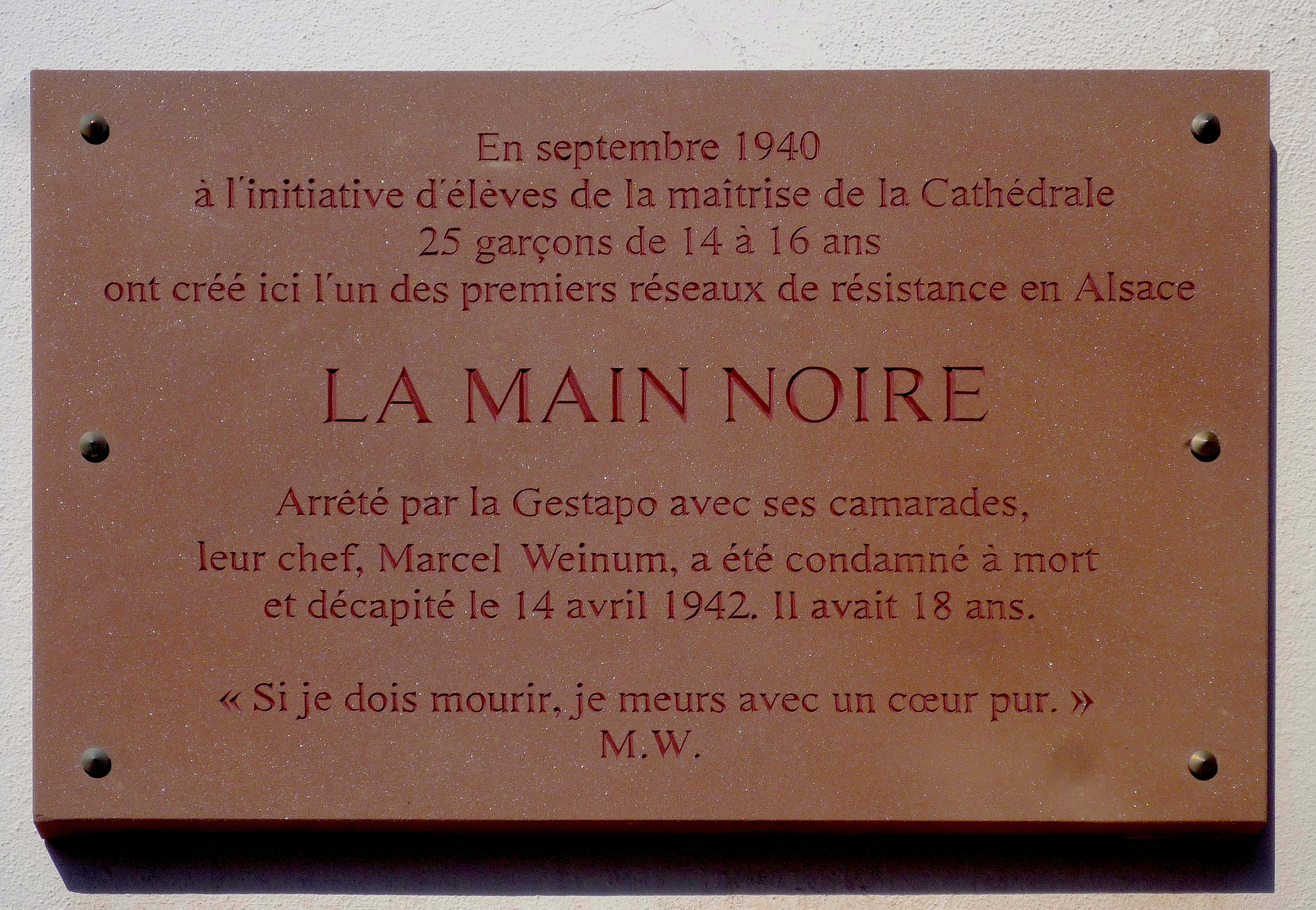
The commemorative tablet affixed on the façade of the episcopal middle school Saint-Étienne in Strasbourg in memory of the young martyr Marcel Weinum beheaded by the Germans.

In September 1940 the first Alsatian resistance movement was created, led by Marcel Weinum and called La main noire (the Black Hand). It was composed of a group of 25 young men aged 14 to 18 years old who led several attacks against the German occupation. The actions culminated with the attack on the Gauleiter Robert Wagner, the highest commander of Alsace, who answered directly to Hitler. In March 1942, Marcel Weinum was prosecuted by the Gestapo and sentenced to be beheaded at the age of 18 in April 1942 in Stuttgart, Germany. His last words will be: "If I have to die, I shall die but with a pure heart".

From 1943 the city was bombarded by Allied aircraft. While the First World War had not notably damaged the city, Anglo-American bombing caused extensive destruction in raids of which at least one was allegedly carried out by mistake. In August 1944, several buildings in the Old Town were damaged by bombs, particularly the Palais Rohan, the Old Customs House (Ancienne Douane) and the Cathedral. On 23 November 1944, the city was officially liberated by the 2nd French Armoured Division under General Leclerc. He achieved the oath that he made with his soldiers, after the decisive Capture of Kufra. With the Oath of Kuffra, they swore to keep up the fight until the French flag flew over the Cathedral of Strasbourg.

Many people from Strasbourg were incorporated in the German Army against their will and were sent to the Eastern Front, those young men and women were called Malgré-nous. Many tried to escape from the incorporation, join the French Resistance, or desert the Wehrmacht but many could not because they were running the risk of having their families sent to work or concentration camps by the Germans. Many of these men, especially those who did not answer the call immediately, were pressured to "volunteer" for service with the SS, often by direct threats to their families.

This threat obliged the majority of them to remain in the German army. After the war, the few that survived were often accused of being traitors or collaborationists, because this situation was not known in the rest of France. In July 1944, 1500 malgré-nous were released from Soviet captivity and sent to Algiers, where they joined the Free French Forces.

== Strasbourg as a symbol of postwar European Unity ==
After 1945, Strasbourg, like all of Alsace, was subjected to Francization-policies. Use of German or Alsacian was banned at schools. Very quickly, French inscriptions replaced German inscriptions in the public sphere. However, contrary to the situation in Bohemia, Pomerania, East Prussia, and Silesia, German-speakers were not generally expelled from the region. Also as a reaction to the Nazi Germanization policies and a felt guilt to mainland France, many families switched to speaking French also at home. As a result, children did not learn the Alsacian dialect, which was often seen as a sign of backwardness. Being removed from German as its Dachsprache, Alsacian was portrayed as a Germanic dialect.

In 1949, the city was chosen to be the seat of the Council of Europe with its European Court of Human Rights and European Pharmacopoeia. Since 1952, the European Parliament has met in Strasbourg, which was formally designated its official 'seat' at the Edinburgh meeting of the European Council of EU heads of state and government in December 1992. (This position was reconfirmed and given treaty status in the 1997 Treaty of Amsterdam). However, only the (four-day) plenary sessions of the Parliament are held in Strasbourg each month, with all other business being conducted in Brussels and Luxembourg. Those sessions take place in the Immeuble Louise Weiss, inaugurated in 1999, which houses the largest parliamentary assembly room in Europe and of any democratic institution in the world. Before that, the EP sessions had to take place in the main Council of Europe building, the Palace of Europe, whose unusual inner architecture had become a familiar sight to European TV audiences. In 1992, Strasbourg became the seat of the Franco-German TV channel and movie-production society Arte.

In 1947, a fire broke out in the Musée des Beaux-Arts and devastated a significant part of the collections. This fire was an indirect consequence of the bombing raids of 1944: because of the destruction inflicted on the Palais Rohan, humidity had infiltrated the building, and moisture had to be fought. This was done with welding torches, and a bad handling of these caused the fire.

In the 1950s and 1960s the city was enlarged by new residential areas meant to solve both the problem of housing shortage due to war damage and that of the strong growth of population due to the baby boom and immigration from North Africa: Cité Rotterdam in the North-East, Quartier de l'Esplanade in the South-East, Hautepierre in the North-West. Between 1995 and 2010, a new district has been built in the same vein, the Quartier des Poteries, south of Hautepierre.

In 1958, a violent hailstorm destroyed most of the historical greenhouses of the Botanical Garden and many of the stained glass windows of St. Paul's Church.

In 2000, a terrorist plot to blow up the cathedral was prevented thanks to the cooperation between French and German police that led to the arrest in late 2000 of a Frankfurt-based group of terrorists.

On 6 July 2001, during an open-air concert in the Parc de Pourtalès, a single falling Platanus tree killed thirteen people and injured 97. On 27 March 2007, the city was found guilty of neglect over the accident and fined €150,000.

In 2006, after a long and careful restoration, the inner decoration of the Aubette, made in the 1920s by Hans Arp, Theo van Doesburg, and Sophie Taeuber-Arp and destroyed in the 1930s, was made accessible to the public again. The work of the three artists had been called "the Sistine Chapel of abstract art".

On 11 December 2018, Chériff Chekatt, who had pledged allegiance to the "Islamic State of Iraq and the Levant", attacked civilians near the Christmas market, killing five and injuring 11. Following a major manhunt, he was shot and killed by police on 13 December.

== See also ==
- Timeline of Strasbourg

== Bibliography ==
- Jordan, Benoît (2006). Histoire de Strasbourg [History of Strasbourg]. Gisserot. ISBN 9782877478700.
