= John Levi (rabbi) =

Australian Progressive rabbi and author (born 1934)

Rabbi Dr John Levi AC

Personal life
- Born: John Simon Levi; 1934 (age 91–92)
- Spouse: Robyn Levi (née Selby)
- Education: University of Melbourne; Hebrew Union College

Religious life
- Religion: Judaism
- Denomination: Progressive Judaism
- Temple: Temple Beth Israel, Melbourne
- Ordination: 1960

Jewish leader
- Post: Rabbi Emeritus of Temple Beth Israel, Melbourne (since 1997)

Rabbi John Simon Levi AC (born 1934) is an Australian Progressive rabbi and author. Upon ordination in 1960, he began serving Melbourne's Temple Beth Israel. He became senior rabbi of the congregation from 1974 until 1997, when he became rabbi emeritus. He is also the founder of Melbourne's King David School.

== Background ==
Levi has deep family roots in Australia stretching back to the mid 1800s, which include Nathaniel Levi, the first state Jewish MP. He attended Melbourne Grammar School and graduated from the University of Melbourne with a double major in Philosophy and Semitic studies. He then spent time living on a kibbutz in Israel before relocating to the United States to study at Hebrew Union College in Cincinnati.

As a student rabbi, he was the first rabbi to serve Auckland's fledgling Reform congregation, Beth Shalom. He also served West London Synagogue in London, as well as congregations in Texas and Iowa. Levi became the first Australian born rabbi when he was ordained in 1960. and joined the staff of Temple Beth Israel. He was senior rabbi there from 1974 to 1997 when he became Rabbi Emeritus. He was named as Rabbi Emeritus of Temple Beth Israel in 1997 Doctor of Laws (honoris causa) of Monash University.

Levi helped found the Australian Council of Christians and Jews in 1985. He was also a vice president of the World Union for Progressive Judaism from 1974 to 1998.

Levi was created a Member of the Order of Australia (AM) in the 1981 Queen's Birthday Honours. In the 2021 Australia Day Honours, Levi was awarded the highest level of honour, the Companion of the Order of Australia (AC). He was given the award for "eminent service to Judaism through seminal roles with religious, community and historical organisations, to the advancement of interfaith understanding, tolerance and collaboration, and to education".

== Bibliography ==
Levi has written about 20 books, including

- Levi, John S (1976), A dictionary of biography of the Jews of Australia, 1788-1830 (Limited ed.), Gardner Printing
- Levi, John S; ProQuest (Firm) (April 2013), These are the names : Jewish lives in Australia, 1788-1850 (Second ed.), Miegunyah Press (published 2013), ISBN 978-0-522-86418-2
