= The Australian Jewish Review =

The Australian Jewish Review was a monthly magazine published in Sydney, in the interest of the country's Liberal Jewish Congregations.

== History ==
The Review began its existence as the newsletter of Temple Beth Israel, Melbourne and owed its existence to a conference which established the Jewish Religious Union of Temple Beth Israel and Temple Emanuel, Sydney, in September 1941. The Union, which was affiliated with the World Union for Progressive Judaism, London, was an association of Progressive Jewish Congregations in contradistinction to the more extreme forms of Zionism characterised by Isaac Isaacs as claiming Palestine as the homeland of all Jews and with loyalty to Israel eclipsing loyalty to their respective country of adoption.

The Review was incorporated into the Liberal Jewish Digest which ceased publication around 1952.

In 1981 a magazine of the same name was launched in Melbourne.
