= Hausbergen =

Hausbergen is a natural region and historic territory in Alsace now divided between three communes of Greater Strasbourg intercommunal structure:

- Niederhausbergen (lower Hausbergen)
- Mittelhausbergen (middle or central Hausbergen)
- Oberhausbergen (upper Hausbergen).

It was the site of the Battle of Hausbergen in 1262, after which Strasbourg became a Free imperial city.

The Hausbergen hills, overlooking the Rhine valley on the east and touching the Kochersberg hills in the west, are located on the territories of the three villages and extend to Mundolsheim. Their peaks culminate at 186 m (610 ft) (Holderberg), 184 m (604 ft) (Pfaffenberg) and 181 m (594 ft) (Alterberg).
