= Religious intolerance =

Intolerance of another's religious beliefs or practices

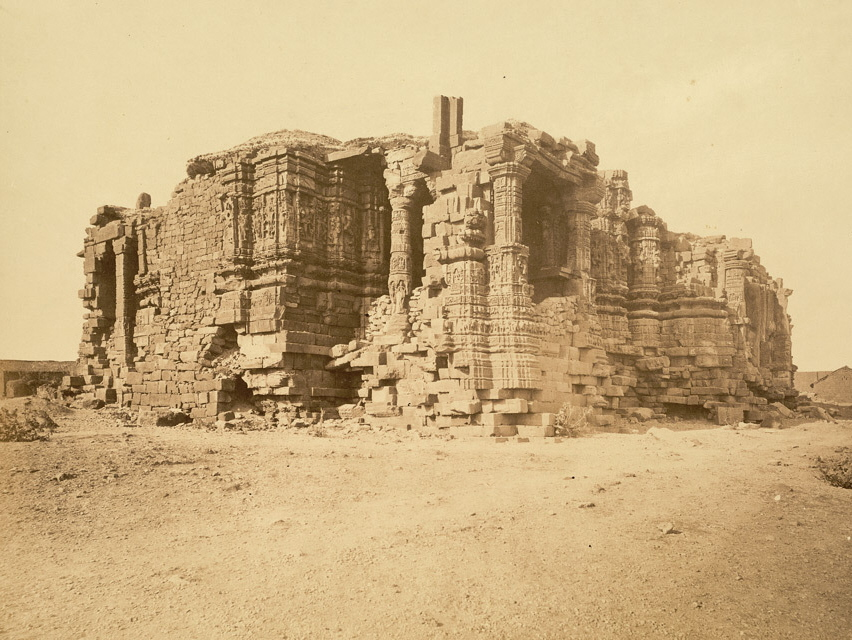
The Somnath Hindu Temple was first attacked by Muslim Turkic invader Mahmud of Ghazni and repeatedly rebuilt after being demolished by more Invaders.

Religious intolerance or religious bigotry is intolerance of another's religious beliefs, practices, faith or lack thereof.

Statements which are contrary to one's religious beliefs do not constitute intolerance. Religious intolerance, rather, occurs when a person or group (e.g., a society, a religious group, a non-religious group) specifically refuses to tolerate the religious convictions and practices of a religious group or individual.

== Historical perspectives ==
The intolerance, and even the active persecution of religious minorities (sometimes religious majorities as in modern Bahrain or the Pre-Dutch Indonesian kingdoms), has a long history. Almost all religions have historically faced and perpetrated persecution of other viewpoints.

The modern concept of religious tolerance developed out of the European wars of religion, more specifically out of the Peace of Westphalia which ended the 30 Years' War (1618–1648), during the Protestant Reformation and the ensuing conflicts between Protestants and Catholics in the 16th, 17th and 18th centuries. The doctrine of 'religious toleration' was established as a result of the 30 Years' War between the Catholic Hapsburgs and newly Protestant nations like Sweden under Gustavus Adolphus. At this time, rulers sought to eradicate religious sentiments and dogmas from their political demesnes. The 1648 Treaty gave nations the right of sovereignty and it also allowed minority Christian denominations to exist within the Holy Roman Empire.

== Contemporary attitude and practice ==
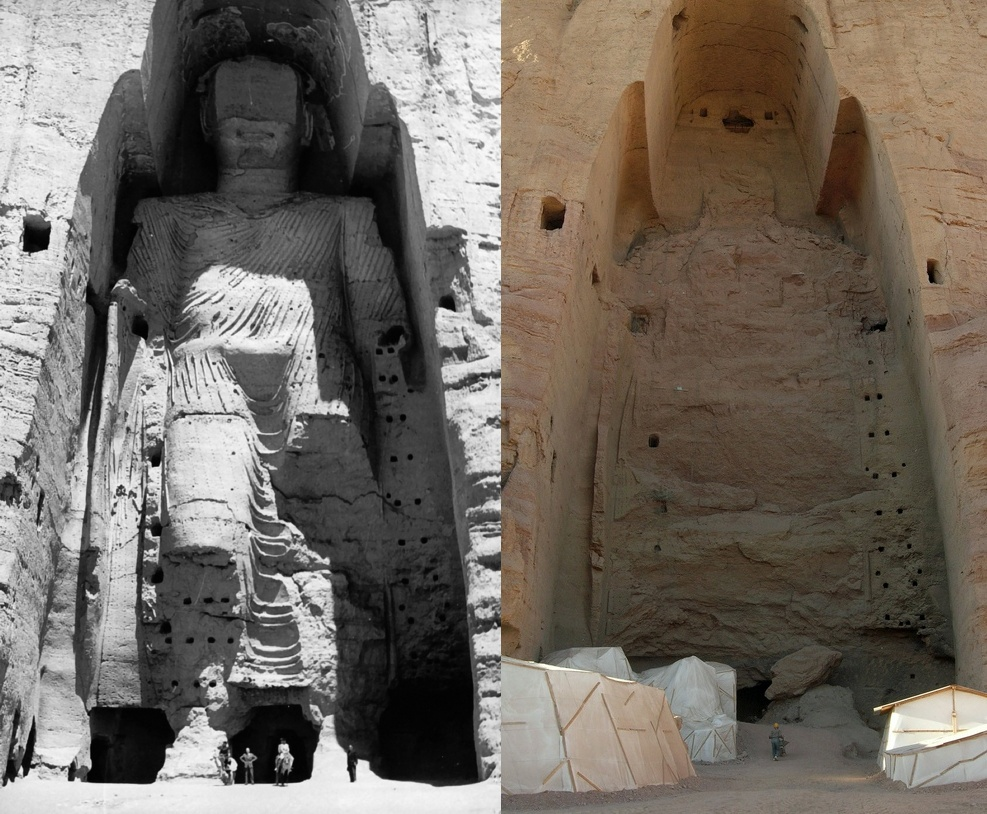
A statue of the Buddha at Bamiyan before and after its March 2001 destruction by Taliban forces

The constitutions of some countries contain provisions which expressly forbid the state from engaging in certain acts of religious intolerance and these same provisions also forbid the state from showing a preference for a particular religion within its own borders, examples of such provisions include the First Amendment to the United States Constitution, the Article 4 of the Basic Law for the Federal Republic of Germany, Article 44.2.1 of the Constitution of Ireland, Article 40 of the Estonian Constitution, Article 24 of the Constitution of Turkey, Article 36 of the Constitution of China, and Article 3 Section 5 of the Constitution of the Philippines.

Other states, whilst not containing constitutional provisions which are directly related to religion, nonetheless contain provisions which forbid discrimination on religious grounds (see, for example, Article 1 of the Constitution of France, article 15 of the Canadian Charter of Rights and Freedoms and article 40 of the Constitution of Egypt). These constitutional provisions do not necessarily guarantee that all elements of the state remain free from religious intolerance at all times, and practice can vary widely from country to country.

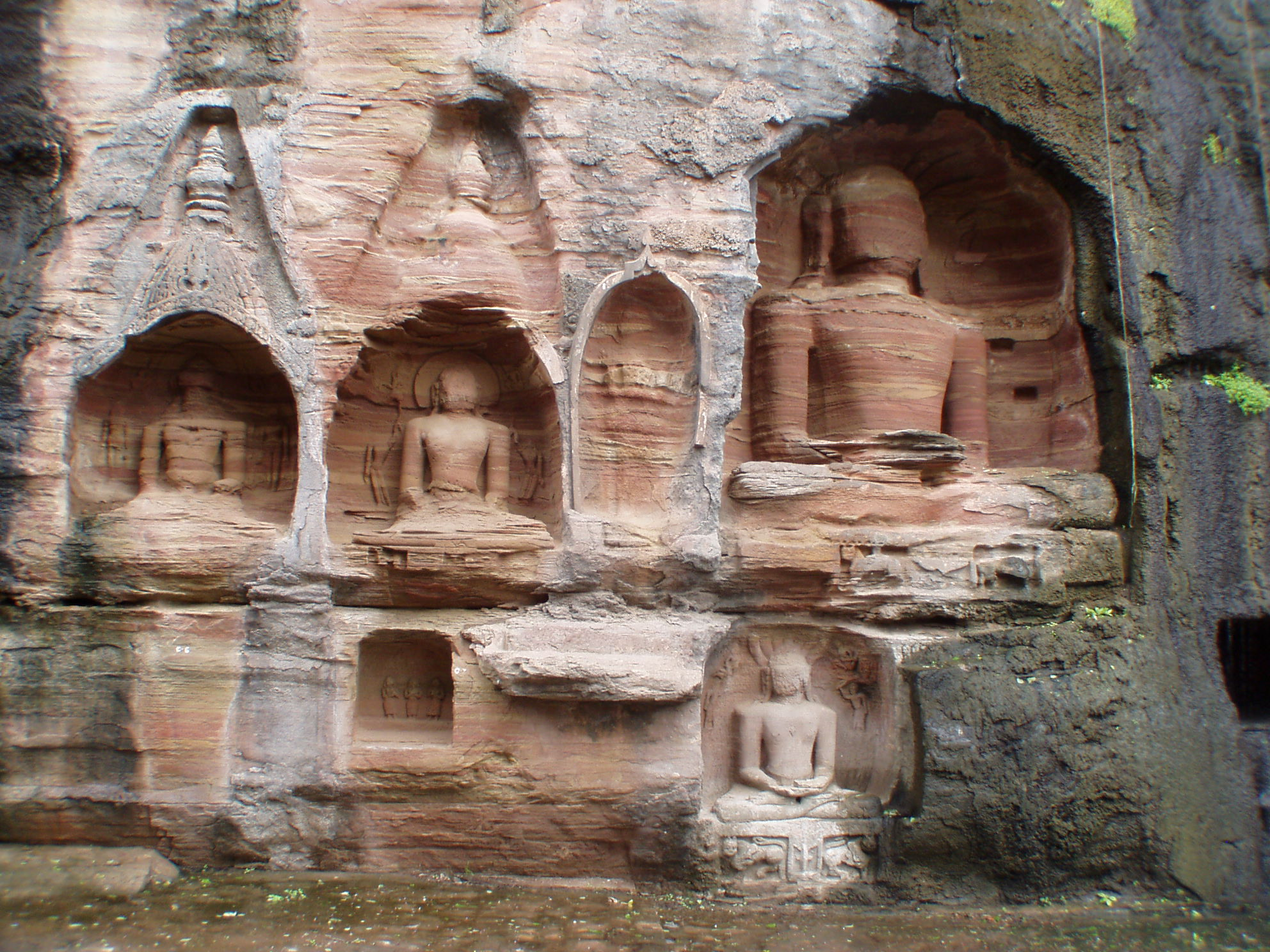
Mughal Emperor Babur demolished Gopalchal rock cut Jain Monuments.

Other countries, meanwhile, may allow for religious preference, for instance through the establishment of one or more state religions, but not for religious intolerance. Finland, for example, has the Evangelical Lutheran Church of Finland and Finnish Orthodox Church as its official state religions, yet upholds the right of free expression of religion in article 11 of its constitution.

In Nazi Germany, smaller religious minorities such as the Jehovah's Witnesses and the Baháʼí Faith were banned in Germany, while the eradication of Judaism was attempted along with the genocide of its adherents.

Hundreds of religious riots have been recorded, in every decade of independent India. In these riots, the victims have included many Muslims, Hindus, Sikhs, Jains, Christians and Buddhists. The US Commission on International Religious Freedom classified India as Tier-2 in persecuting religious minorities, the same as that of Iraq and Egypt. In a 2018 report, USCIRF charged Hindu nationalist groups for their campaign to "Saffronize" India through violence, intimidation, and harassment against non-Hindus. Approximately one-third of state governments enforced anti-conversion and/or anti-cow slaughter laws against non-Hindus, and mobs engaged in violence against Muslims whose families have been engaged in the dairy, leather, or beef trades for generations, and against Christians for proselytizing. "Cow protection" lynch mobs killed at least 10 victims in 2017.

Some countries retain laws which forbid the defamation of religious beliefs. Some constitutions retain laws which forbid all forms of blasphemy (e.g., Germany where, in 2006, Manfred van H. was convicted of blasphemy against Islam). The connection between intolerance and blasphemy laws is closest when the laws apply to only one religion. In Pakistan blasphemy directed against either the tenets of the Qur'an or the Islamic prophet Muhammad is punishable by either life imprisonment or death. Apostasy, the rejection of one's old religion, is also criminalized in a number of countries, notably Afghanistan with Abdul Rahman being the first to face the death penalty for converting to Christianity. Though, he was later released.

Welsh Government advisory video: religious hate crime; 2021

The United Nations upholds the right to freely express one's religious beliefs, as listed in the UN's charter, and additionally in articles 2 and 18 of the Universal Declaration of Human Rights. Article 2 forbids discrimination based on religious grounds. Article 18 protects the freedom to change one's religion. As a treaty, not a declaration, is legally binding, the signing of the human rights declaration is a public pledge of commitment. Out of a desire to avoid subservience to an international court, the United States chose in 1998 to pass the International Religious Freedom Act, creating the Commission on International Religious Freedom, and mandating that the United States government take action against any country found to violate the religious freedoms outlined in the Universal Declaration of Human Rights. Human Rights Council in 2011 adopted Resolution 16/18 on "Combating intolerance, negative stereotyping and stigmatization of, and discrimination, incitement to violence and violence against, persons based on religion or belief" which was hailed by stakeholders from all regions and faiths as a turning point in international efforts to confront religious intolerance. The European Convention on Human Rights, which is legally binding on all European Union states (following the passage of the Human Rights Act 1998 in the United Kingdom), makes restricting the rights of an individual to practice or change their religion illegal in article 9, and discrimination on the basis of religion illegal in article 14.

In North Korea, The regime reportedly continues to repress the religious activities of unauthorized religious groups. North Korea is considered an atheist state, where refugees, defectors and non-governmental organizations (NGOs) continued to allege that they witnessed the arrests and execution of members of underground Christian churches by the regime in prior years. Due to the country's inaccessibility and the inability to gain timely information, this activity remains difficult to verify.

In its 2000 annual report on international religious freedom, the U.S. State Department cited China, Myanmar, Iran, Iraq and Sudan for persecuting people for their religious faith and practices. The report, which covers July 1999 through June 2000, details U.S. policy toward countries where religious freedom is violated in the view of the State Department.

The advocacy group Freedom House produced a report entitled "Religious Freedom in the World" in 2000 which ranked countries according to their religious freedom. The countries receiving a score of 7, indicating those where religious freedom was least respected, were Turkmenistan, Iran, Saudi Arabia, Sudan, Myanmar and North Korea. China was given a score of 6 overall, however Tibet was listed separately in the 7 category. Those countries receiving a score of 1, indicating the highest level of religious freedom, were Estonia, Finland, Ireland, the Netherlands, Norway and the United States.

Within those countries that openly advocate religious tolerance there remain debates as to the limits of tolerance. Some individuals and religious groups, for example, retain beliefs or practices which involve acts contrary to established law, such as the use of cannabis by members of the Rastafari movement, the religious use of eagle feathers by non-Native Americans (contrary to the eagle feather law, 50 CFR 22), or the practice of polygamy amongst the LDS Church in the 19th century.

== In Australia ==
Religious freedom has developed partly due to the agreeable relationship between religious groups in its society. Several non-governmental organizations promoted tolerance and better understanding among religions in the country, both indigenous and non-indigenous. These groups included the Columbian Centre for Christian-Muslim Relations, the National Council of Churches in Australia and its affiliated Aboriginal and Islander Commission, and the Australian Council of Christians and Jews. In Victoria, Australia the Racial and Religious Tolerance Act 2001 makes illegal "conduct that incites hatred against, serious contempt for, or revulsion or severe ridicule of, that other person or class of persons" on the grounds of religious belief.

In 2003, in response to an increase in anti-Islamic sentiment, the HREOC undertook a project involving national consultations on eliminating prejudice against Arab and Muslim citizens. As part of the consultations, the commission considered whether Muslim citizens shared an ethnic origin or race, as well as a religion, which would entitle them to comprehensive protection under the Federal Race Discrimination Act. The commission's report, made public in June 2004, contained no findings on the racial status of Arab and Muslim citizens. In January 2005 the leader of the Australian Nationalist Movement was connected to incidents in 2004 in which several Asian-owned businesses and a synagogue in Perth were firebombed or sprayed with racist graffiti. On December 11, 2005, there was a riot in the Sydney suburb of Cronulla, that erupted because a group of Lebanese-Australian youths had assaulted two lifeguards. Demonstrators against the assault displayed anti-Arab and anti-Muslim slogans. When the gathering turned violent, bystanders perceived to be of Middle Eastern origin or Muslim were attacked. The following day, retaliatory vandalism and other assaults were reported around Sydney.

== See also ==
- Antireligion – Opposition or hostility to religion
- Antitheism – Opposition to theism, and usually to religion
- Demonization – Characterization of individuals, groups, or political bodies as evil
- Forced conversion – Adoption of a different religion or irreligion under duress
- Fundamentalism – Unwavering attachment to a set of irreducible beliefs
- Hate crime – Usually violent, prejudice-motivated crime
- Religious discrimination – Treating a person or group differently because of their religious beliefs
- Religious fanaticism – Fanaticism towards a religion
- Religious freedom – Human right to practice, or not, a religion without conflict from governing powers
- Religious persecution – Persecution based on religious belief
- Religious tolerance – Allowing or permitting something that one disapproves
- Religious violence – Violence practiced in the name of religion
- Religious supremacism – Ideology
- Religious terrorism – Terrorism motivated by religious beliefs
- Religious war – War primarily over religious differences
- Sectarian violence – Violence motivated by conflict between sects of ideology or religion
- State atheism – Official promotion of atheism by a government
- State religion – Religion or creed endorsed by the state
- Toleration – Allowing or permitting something that one disapproves
- Violence against LGBT people#Religious texts

Specific religions

- Anti-cult movement
- Christian countercult movement – Social movement opposing certain religious sects
- Discrimination against atheists – Discrimination based on lack of religious belief
- Persecution of Baháʼís
- Persecution of Buddhists
- Persecution of Christians
  - Anti-Mormonism – Hostility towards the Latter Day Saint movement
  - Anti-Protestantism – Discrimination against Protestants
  - Persecution of Eastern Orthodox Christians
  - Anti-Catholicism – Hostility or prejudice towards Catholics
  - Anti-Christian sentiment – Discrimination against Christianity or Christians
- Persecution of Hindus
  - Anti-Hinduism
- Persecution of Jews
  - Anti-Judaism – Total or partial opposition to Judaism
  - Antisemitism – Hostility, prejudice, or discrimination against Jews
- Persecution of Muslims
  - Islamophobia – Discrimination against Islam or Muslims

Religious nationalism – Relationship between national identity and religion

  - Christian nationalism – Christian ideology espousing religious nationalism
  - Islam and nationalism – Overview of Islamic views on nationalistic practices
  - Hindutva – Indian Hindu nationalist political ideology
  - Religious Zionism – Ideology that views Zionism as a fundamental component of Orthodox Judaism

Specific examples

- 2012 Ramu violence – Religious persecutions in Bangladesh
- Aranthalawa massacre – 1987 Buddhist monk massacre
- Bodh Gaya bombings – Set of terrorist bombings in India
- Buddhas of Bamiyan – Sculptures in Afghanistan before 2001
- Buddhist crisis – 1963 political and religious tension in South Vietnam
- Demolition of the Babri Masjid – 1992 communal riot in India
- Destruction of cultural heritage by ISIL – Part of the War against the Islamic State (2014–present)
- Conversion of non-Islamic places of worship into mosques
