= St. Paul's Church, Strasbourg =

Coordinates: 48°35′11″N 7°45′35″E

- Église Saint-Paul de Strasbourg
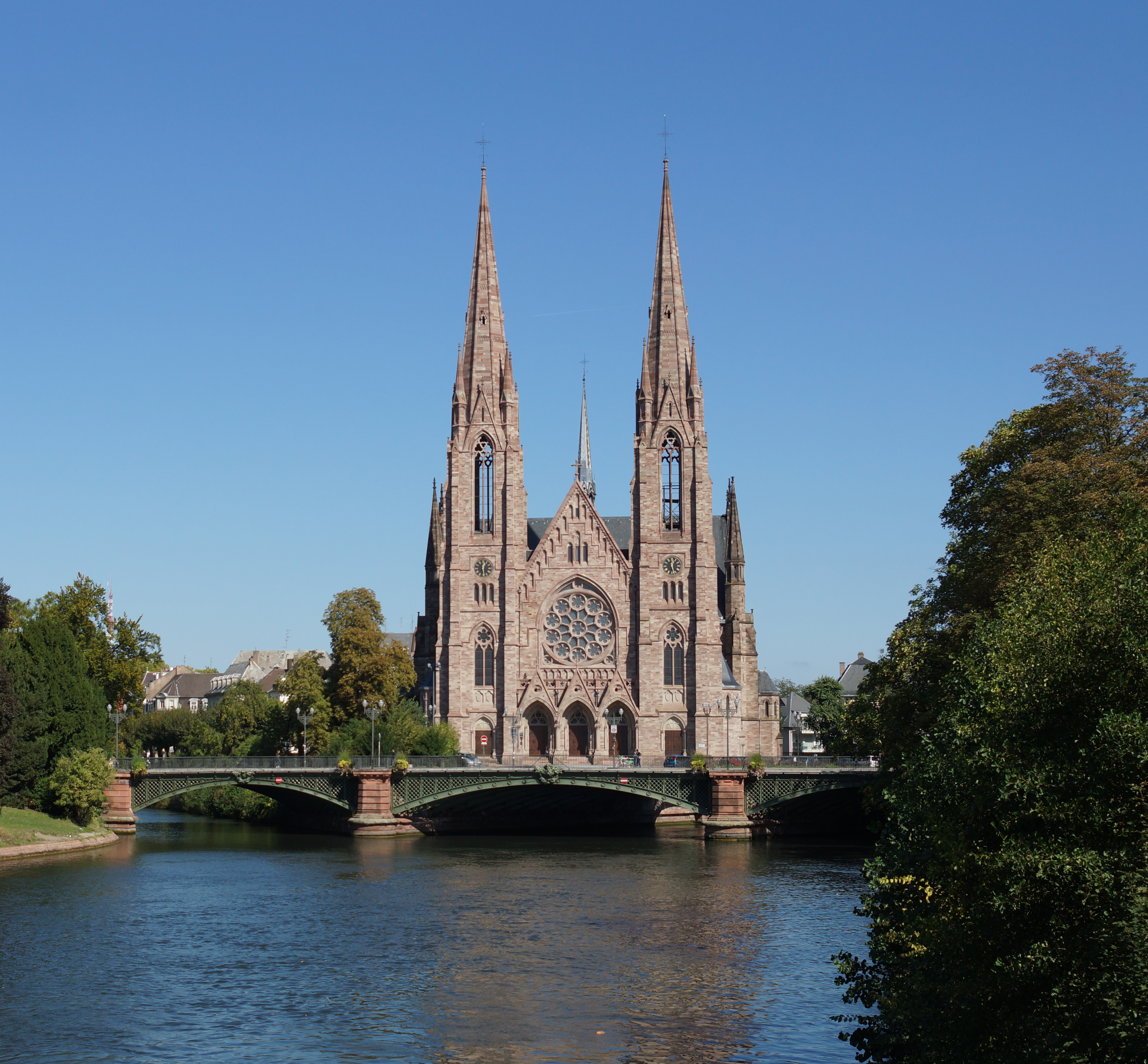
- St. Paul's Church, Strasbourg
- Location: Strasbourg
- Country: France
- Denomination: Reformed
- Previous denomination: Lutheran

History
- Founded: 1892

Architecture
- Heritage designation: Monument historique
- Designated: 1998
- Architect: Louis Muller
- Style: Gothic Revival architecture
- Completed: 1897

Specifications
- Height: 76 m (249 ft)

The St. Paul's Church of Strasbourg (French: Église réformée Saint-Paul or Église Saint-Paul de Strasbourg) is a major Gothic Revival architecture building and one of the landmarks of the city of Strasbourg, in Alsace, France.

Built between 1892 and 1897 during the time of the Reichsland Elsass-Lothringen (1870–1918), the church was designed for the Lutheran members of the Imperial German garrison stationed in Strasbourg. Several of the church's most striking features, such as its great width relative to its not so great length and the inordinately high number of portals and entrances giving access to it (19 in all, compared to Strasbourg Cathedral's 7) result from the need to accommodate military personnel from the very highest ranks down, including the Emperor, in case he came (the actual Imperial Palace being not far away). In 1919, after the return of Alsace to France, the church was handed over to the Protestant Reformed Church of Alsace and Lorraine and became its second parish church in the town after Bouclier parish.

For the overall design of the church, architect Louis Muller (1842–1898) drew his inspiration from the Elisabeth Church of Marburg, although he did not slavishly copy its design, gracing St. Paul's Church with three large and elaborate rose windows modelled on the (smaller scaled) rose window adorning the façade of St. Thomas' Church. The 20 m (66 ft) high nave was originally supposed to have four bays instead of three and thus the building to be 5 m (16 ft) longer and shaped like a Latin cross; but because of excessive costs due to technical difficulties with the foundations, it was shortened to a Greek cross. Thanks to its spires rising up to 76 m (249 ft) and its spectacular location at the southern extremity of an island in the middle of the largest section of the Ill River, the church can be seen from far away.

The church furnishings were damaged from British and American bombing raids in August 1944, as well as, as far as the stained glass windows are concerned, from a violent hailstorm in 1958, incidentally the same hailstorm that destroyed most of the Botanical Garden's historical greenhouses. The most outstanding feature inside is the main tribune pipe organ of 1897 (modified in 1934 and restored several times since), also classified as Monument historique. This is, by the number of pipes and registers as well as by the sheer size of the organ case, one of the largest instruments in Alsace and most probably Eastern France. In 1976, a second pipe organ was installed in the transept.

== Gallery ==
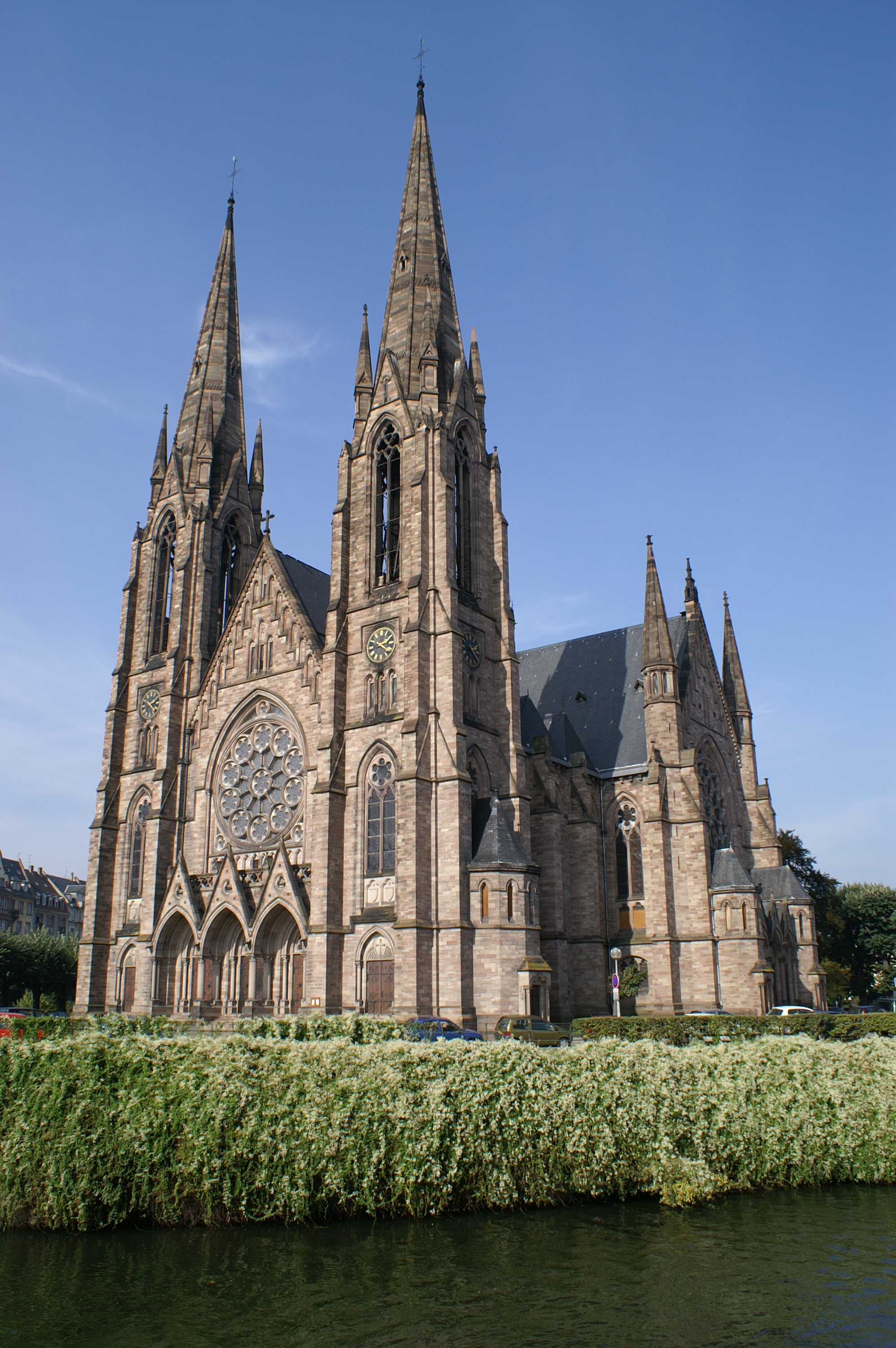
View from south

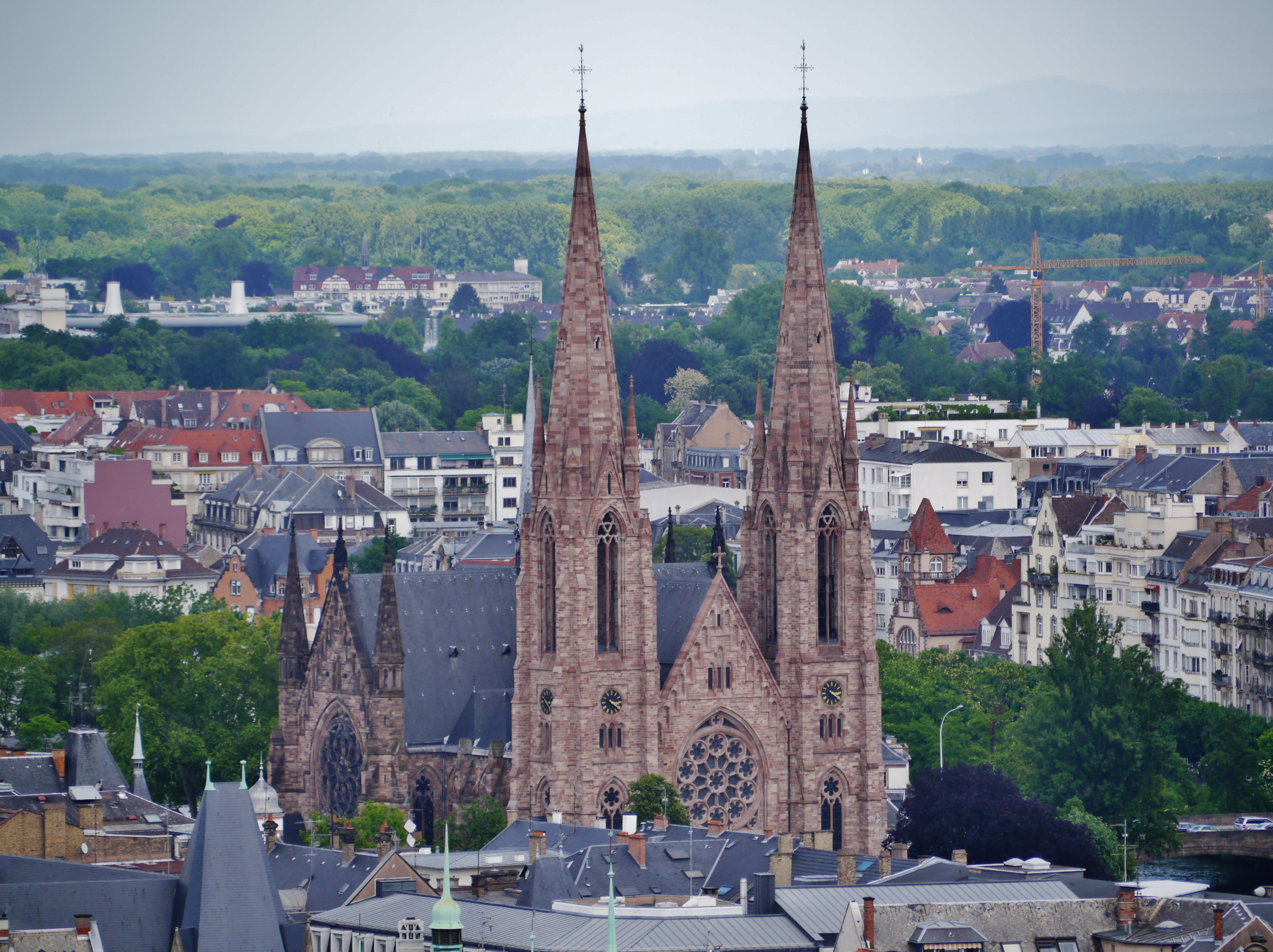
The church's twin spires rising high above their surrounding

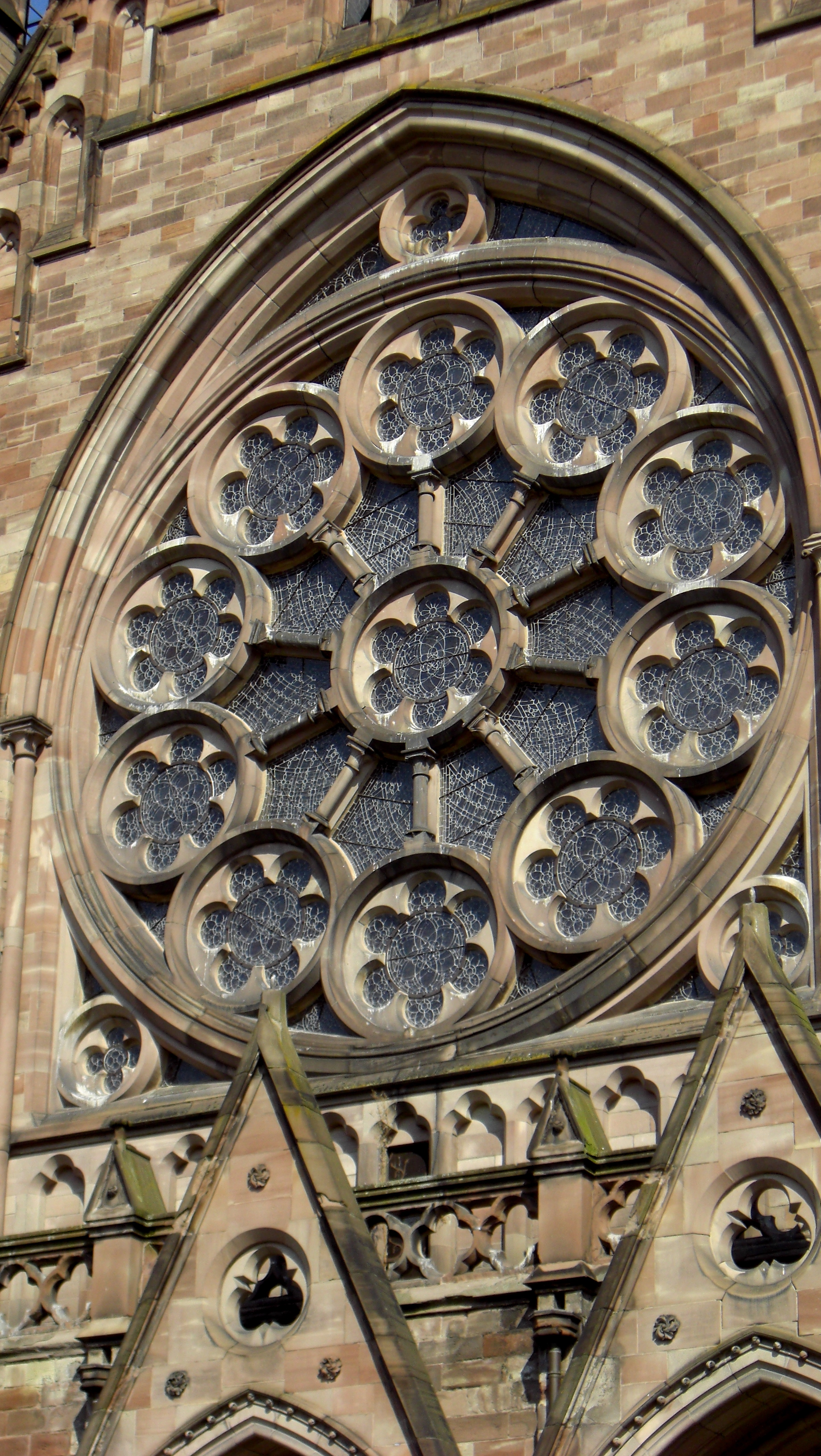
Rose window of the façade

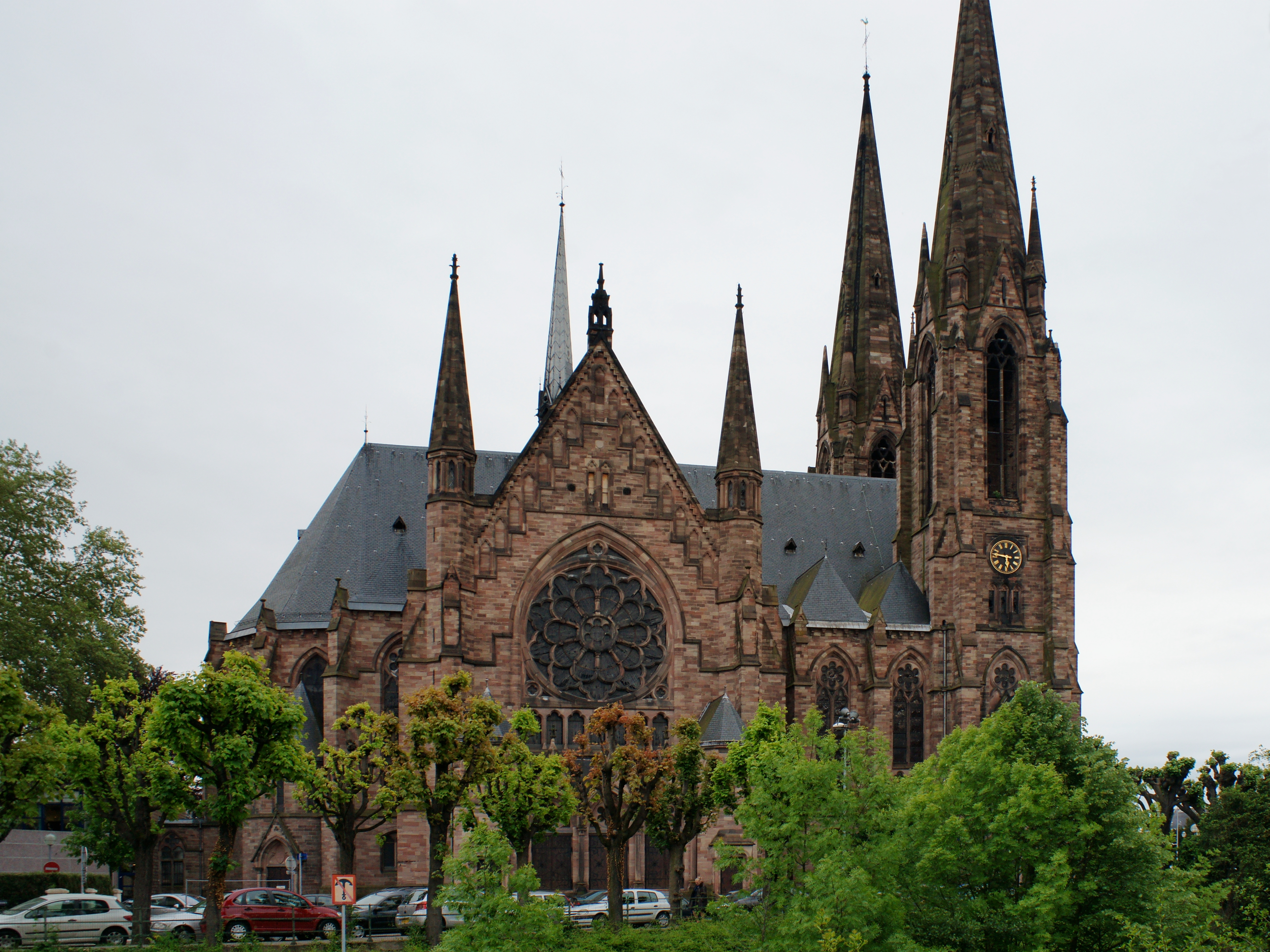
Northern transept

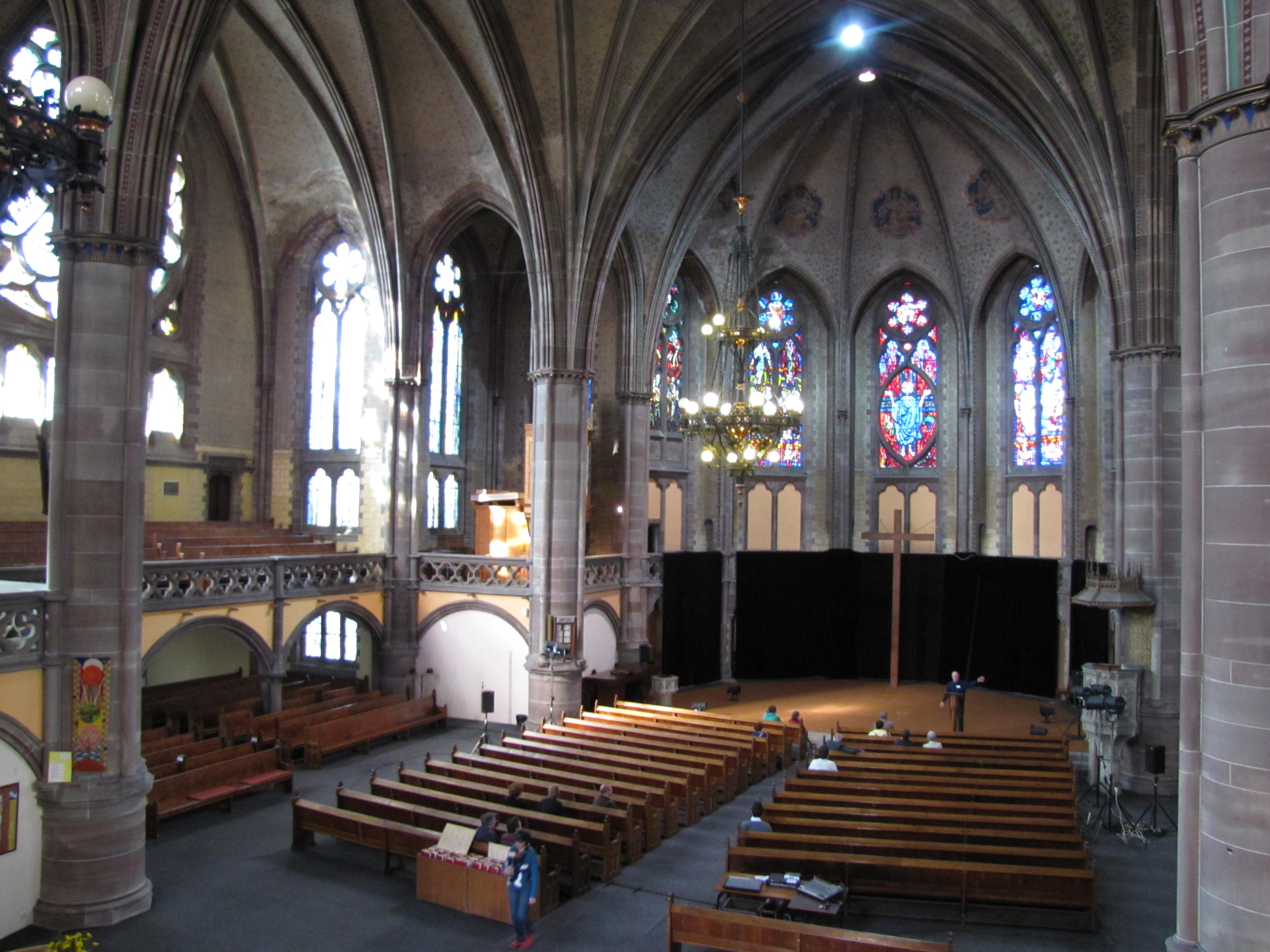
Inside the church

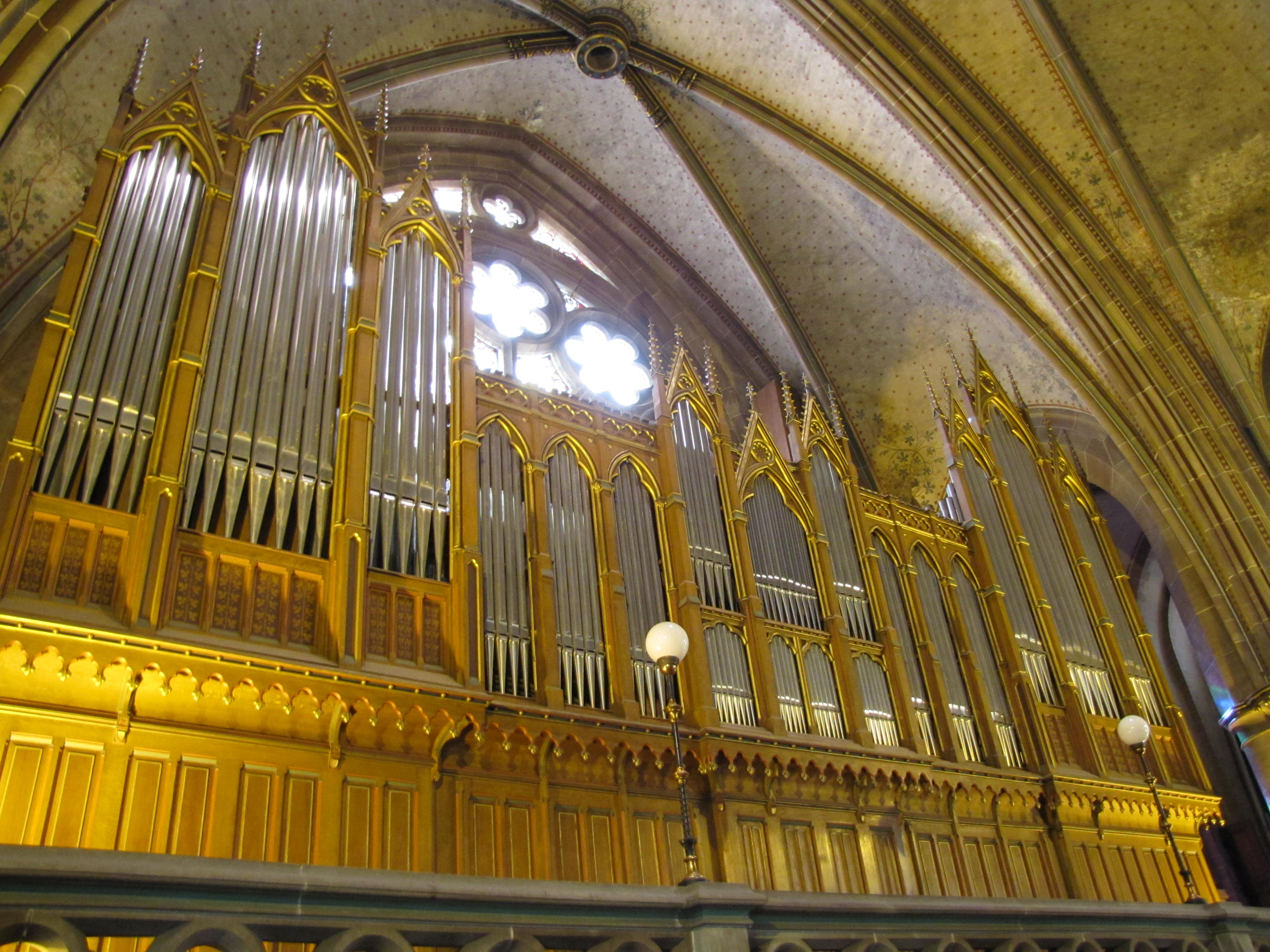
The main pipe organ

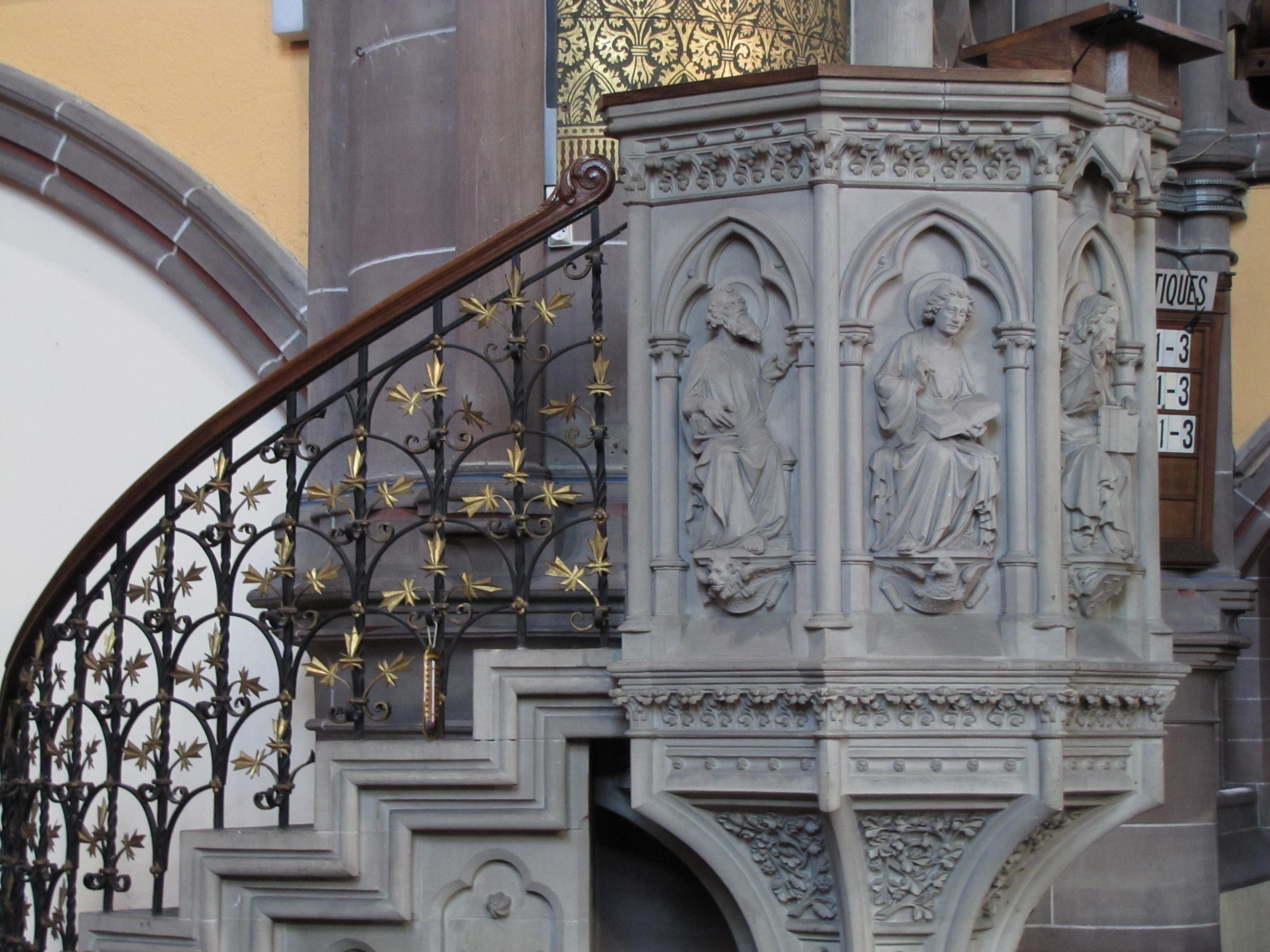
The pulpit

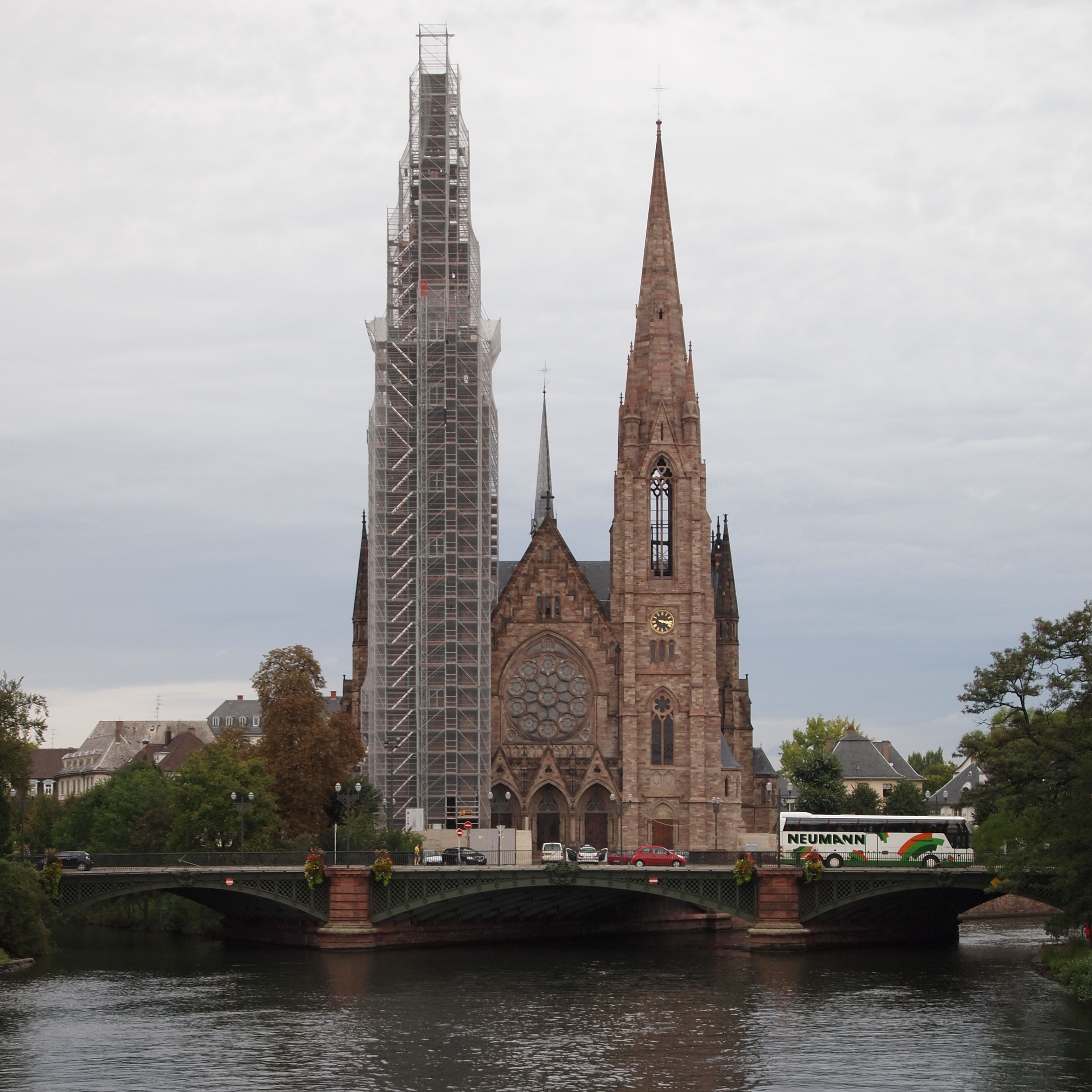
Renovation of the north tower in 2011
