= Niederhausbergen =

Niederhausbergen Nìderhüsbarje (Alsatian)
- Commune
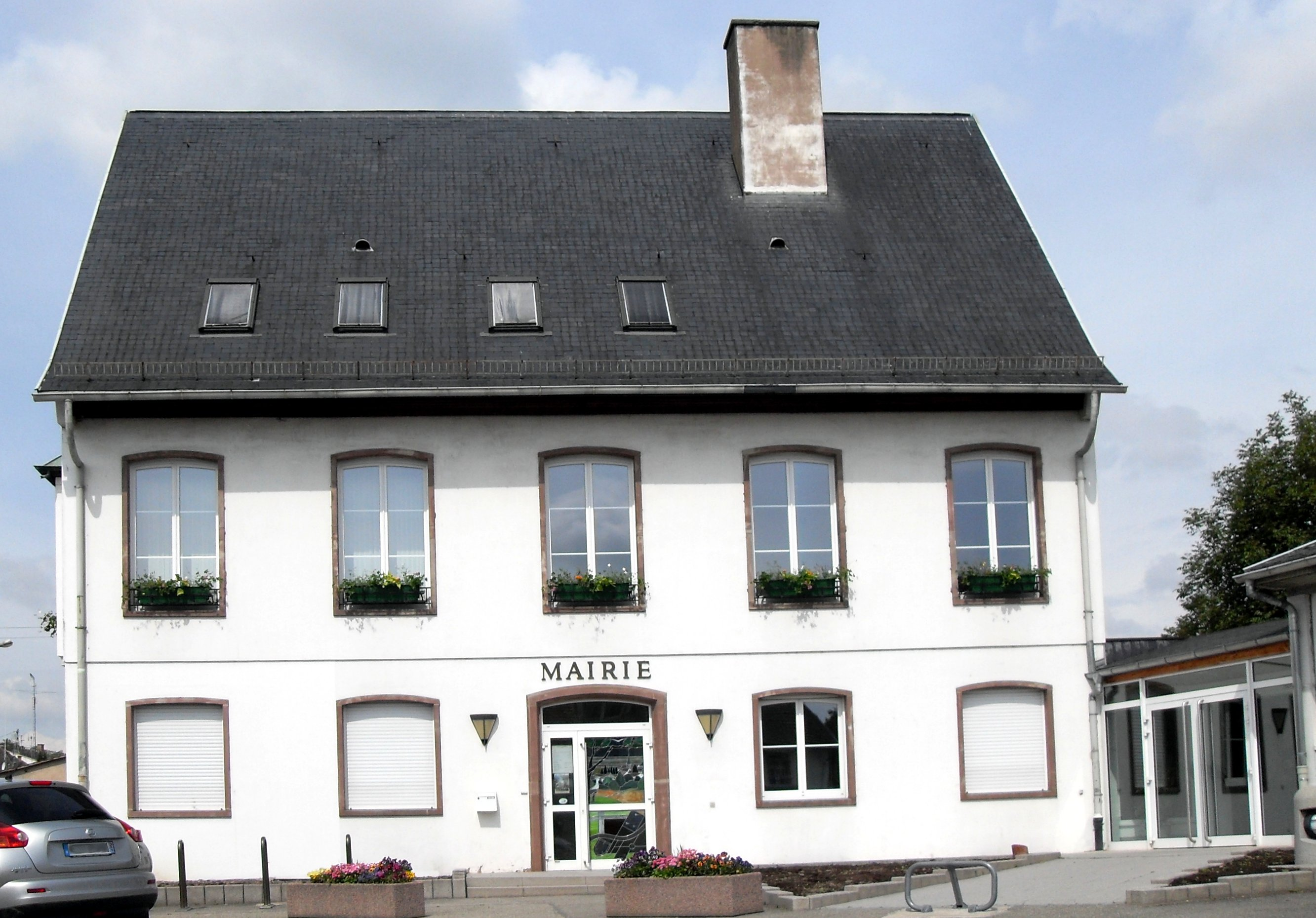
- The town hall in Niederhausbergen

- Coat of arms
- Location of Niederhausbergen
- Location within France Location within Grand Est
- Coordinates: 48°37′30″N 7°42′17″E
- Country: France
- Region: Grand Est
- Department: Bas-Rhin
- Arrondissement: Strasbourg
- Canton: Hœnheim
- Intercommunality: Strasbourg Eurométropole

Government
  - Mayor (2020–2026): Jean-Luc Herzog
- Area^{1}: 3.06 km^{2} (1.18 sq mi)
- Highest elevation: 191 m (627 ft)
- Lowest elevation: 141 m (463 ft)
- Population (2023): 1,721
  - Density: 562/km^{2} (1,460/sq mi)
- Time zone: UTC+01:00 (CET)
  - Summer (DST): UTC+02:00 (CEST)
- INSEE/Postal code: 67326 /67207
- ^{1} French Land Register data, which excludes lakes, ponds, glaciers > 1 km^{2} (0.386 sq mi or 247 acres) and river estuaries.

Niederhausbergen (Alsatian: Nìderhüsbarje) is a commune in the Bas-Rhin department in Grand Est in north-eastern France.

Niederhausbergen is a small residential area on the outskirts of Strasbourg, located 6 km northwest of the latter. It adjoins the hill Hausbergen, which represents the foothills of the Vosges du Nord region Kochersberg.

== See also ==
- Communes of the Bas-Rhin department
