= Temple Beth Israel, Melbourne =

Temple Beth Israel
- Location of the synagogue in Melbourne

Religion
- Affiliation: Reform Judaism
- Ecclesiastical or organizational status: Synagogue
- Year consecrated: 1938
- Status: Active

Location
- Location: 76/82 Alma Rd, St Kilda, Victoria 3182
- Country: Australia
- Interactive map of Temple Beth Israel
- Coordinates: 37°51′40″S 144°59′26″E

Architecture
- Type: Synagogue architecture
- Founder: Ada Phillips
- Established: 1930 (as a congregation)
- Completed: 1938

Temple Beth Israel (TBI) is a Progressive Jewish congregation and synagogue, located in St Kilda, an inner seaside suburb of Melbourne, Australia. The organisation is a member of the Union for Progressive Judaism, an umbrella organisation for Progressive Judaism in Asia and the Pacific.

== History ==
In 1930, Ada Phillips founded the synagogue, the first Progressive community in Australia. Phillips had been inspired by services she attended in 1928 at the Liberal Jewish Synagogue in London. Phillips was impressed by its values, liturgy and felt compelled to found a progressive congregation in Australia. The World Union for Progressive Judaism subsidised the congregation in its early years. Rabbi Jerome Mark, a Reform Rabbi from the United States, served as the congregation's first rabbi, serving a term of three years. Services were held on Saturday and Sunday mornings at Wickliffe House on St Kilda promenade. The new congregation was not welcomed by Rabbi Danglow of the St Kilda Hebrew Congregation, a Modern Orthodox synagogue. Danglow decried the arrival of progressive Judaism in Melbourne: "a mutation of Judaism, specially compounded and flavoured to tickle the palates of religiously languid Jews."

In 1936, the congregation was at the point of collapse as the congregation numbered fewer than 100. A Berlin rabbi, Rabbi Herman Sanger was appointed in the same year and transformed the fortunes of the congregation. Land was purchased on Alma Road, and Isaac Isaacs laid the cornerstone on 11 July 1937. Three Torah scrolls were sent to the congregation from Berlin's Jewish community. The new synagogue building was consecrated in 1938, drawing in many of the local Jewish emigrants from Germany and Australia, some of whom had belonged to Reform congregations in their native countries. Sanger's passionate support for Zionism in contrast to Rabbi Danglow's lukewarm stance, also drew new members, with 500 members by 1941. By the time of the end of the war in 1945, 1600 people were attending the congregation's High Holiday services. Rabbi John Levi, the congregation's first Australian-born rabbi served the congregation from 1960. He served as senior rabbi from 1974 to 1997, and has since been Rabbi Emeritus of the congregation.

=== Current ===
The Progressive, Zionist youth group, Netzer makes use of the grounds of TBI for their weekly activities.

During the COVID-19 pandemic TBI moved their prayers online for the High Holy Days, when Melbourne was in the middle of a strict stage 4 lockdown.

== Notable members ==
- Zelman Cowen, 19th Governor-General of Australia

== See also ==
- List of synagogues in Australia
- History of the Jews in Australia
