= Australian Council of Christians and Jews =

- Abbreviation: ACCJ
- Formation: 17 December 1991; 34 years ago
- Type: NGO
- Affiliations: International Council of Christians and Jews

The Australian Council of Christians and Jews was formed on 17 December 1991 when the International Council of Christians and Jews required a national organisation to be its Australian affiliate. It was founded by the New South Wales and Victorian councils. It now has groups from five states or territories of Australia and includes a number of interfaith groups. Donations to the Australian Council of Christians and Jews have been tax-deductible since 1998.
