= 2005 Queen's Birthday Honours (Australia) =

The 2005 Queen's Birthday Honours for Australia were announced on Monday 13 June 2005 by the Governor-General, Michael Jeffery.

The Birthday Honours were appointments by some of the 16 Commonwealth realms of Queen Elizabeth II to various orders and honours to reward and highlight good works by citizens of those countries. The Birthday Honours are awarded as part of the Queen's Official Birthday celebrations during the month of June.

== Order of Australia ==
=== Companion (AC) ===
==== General Division ====
Recipient	Citation	Notes
The Honourable James Alexander Bacon	For service to the Tasmanian Parliament, to developing strategies for long-term social, economic and environmental benefit, and to support for a vibrant arts and cultural life in the State.	
Stella May Bywaters	For service to the international community, during an unsafe and dangerous period in Uganda, through the provision of humanitarian aid and nursing care to improve the lives of the sick, poor and dispossessed and to the Salvation Army.	
Douglas Neville Daft	For service to leadership in the global business community, commitment to corporate social responsibility, contributions in the field of education, and support for community based development initiatives.	
The Honourable Dame Margaret Georgina Guilfoyle	For significant contributions to public life in Australia in support of hospital and health administration, social justice and education, to young people as a role model, and to the Australian Parliament.	
His Eminence Cardinal George Pell	For service to the Catholic Church in Australia and internationally, to raising debate on matters of an ethical and spiritual nature, to education, and to social justice.	
Dame Margaret Catherine Scott	For service to the arts and commitment to cultural development, particularly in the field of dance as Founding Director of the Australian Ballet School and to encouraging young artists to achieve the highest standards in their careers.	

=== Officer (AO) ===
==== General Division ====
Recipient	Citation	Notes
Roslyn Allan	For service to the finance sector, particularly through the development of postgraduate and distance education, training courses and professional standards.	
Charles Hamilton Bell	For service to business, to management development, and to the community through support for and promotion of a range of charitable and cultural organisations.	
Dr Coral Mary Bell	For service to scholarship and to teaching as a leading commentator and contributor to foreign and defence policy debate internationally and in Australia.	
Emeritus Professor Freda Briggs	For service to raising community and professional awareness of child abuse and neglect and as an advocate for effective child safety education programs.	
John Graham Brown	For service to promoting rural and regional economic development initiatives in Victoria, to the community through sporting and emergency services activities, and to the wine industry.	
Michael Joseph Carmody	For service to the community in the area of taxation administration and reform through innovative approaches to the design and implementation of new policies and operations.	
Virginia Anne Chadwick	For service to conservation and the environment through management of the environmental, heritage and economic sustainability issues affecting the Great Barrier Reef, and to the New South Wales Parliament, particularly in the areas of child welfare and education.	
Norman Coldham-Fussell	For service to business and commerce, particularly the mining and travel sectors, and to the community through a range of church, social welfare, musical and educational organisations.	
John Harry Conomos	For service to the Australian automotive industry through contributions to policy formulation, economic reform initiatives and the development of environmental and safety standards.	
The Reverend Timothy Ewen Costello	For service to the community through contributions to social justice, health and welfare issues, international development assistance, and to the Baptist Church.	
William John Farmer	For service to the community through contributions to Australia's international relations and to major public policy development including domestic security, border systems, immigration, multicultural affairs and Indigenous service delivery.	
Sister Patricia Ellen Franklin	For service in the field of international humanitarian relief and to children in South East Asia, particularly in Vietnam, through the establishment and administration of education and social welfare programs.	
Janice Lillian Fullerton	For service to librarianship through the facilitation of wider community access to the collections of the National Library of Australia, the preservation of cultural heritage in digital forms, and collaboration with other collecting agencies nationally and internationally.	
Diana Eirene Gibson	For service to the community through philanthropy and support for a broad range of health and aged care, medical research, child welfare and cultural organisations.	
The Honourable Justice Alan Henry Goldberg	For service to the judiciary, particularly in the areas of competition law and equity, and to the community as a contributor to debate on human rights and civil liberties and as a supporter of the arts.	
Professor Shirley Diane Gregor	For service as an educator and researcher in the field of information systems and to the development of applications for electronic commerce in the agribusiness sector.	
Professor Eric Albert Haan	For service to clinical genetics, particularly as a researcher and practitioner, to education, and to the community as a contributor to the debate on the ethical, legal and social implications in science.	
Geoffrey Norman Handbury	For service to the community as a benefactor to a broad range of educational, health, social welfare, environmental, youth and cultural organisations, and to international humanitarian relief through the activities of Care Australia.	
Helen Handbury	For service to the community as a benefactor to a broad range of educational, health, social welfare, environmental, youth and cultural organisations, and to international humanitarian relief through the activities of Care Australia.	
Professor Thomas William Healy	For service to science as a researcher and academic in the area of physical chemistry, and to the community through support for the activities of the Ian Potter Foundation and Philanthropy Australia.	
David Taylor Irvine	For service to furthering Australian international interests and the development of trade links, particularly in negotiating a bilateral agreement with China for the supply of energy.	
Professor Graeme John Jameson	For service to engineering, science, industry and the environment as an inventor and through contributions in the fields of fluid and particle mechanics, mineral processing, water and wastewater treatment and particle technology.	
The Honourable Justice Stanley Graham Jones	For service to the community through contributions to the establishment of higher education institutions and legal and judicial services in central Queensland.	
Christopher David Jordan	For service through the provision of high-level advice to government in relation to the development and implementation of taxation legislation and reform of Australia's taxation system.	
The Honourable Justice Murray Bryon Kellam	For service to the law through a range of judicial and legal training roles in Australia and the Asia-Pacific region, and to the community, particularly through support for the activities of the Jesuit Refugee Service in Thailand and for disadvantaged people in Melbourne.	
Geoffrey Howard Levy	For service to the community through support for and philanthropic contributions to a broad range of arts, sporting and charitable organisations.	
Emeritus Professor Donald Anthony Low	For service to scholarship and learning through the study of history focussed on Asia, particularly South Asia, East Africa and broader Commonwealth history.	
Professor Arthur Maurice Lucas	For service to educational administration through developing initiatives and collaborations between Australian and British tertiary institutions, and through raising awareness internationally of the quality and significance of Australian scientific research.	
Isador Alexander Magid	For service to the community through fostering the development of educational institutions in Australia and Israel, promoting tolerance and co-operation, and contributing to a broad range of charitable organisations.	
The Honourable Justice Jane Hamilton Mathews	For service to the judiciary, to the legal profession, to the University of New South Wales, and to music.	
Nelson John Meers	For service to the preservation of Australian cultural life and to the community through donations and support for a broad range of arts organisations and projects to conserve the Mitchell Library's collection of documented Australian heritage.	
David Allen Mortimer	For service to business and commerce through innovative and visionary leadership, as an adviser to government, and to the community.	
Allan Edward Moss	For service to the investment banking industry through innovative management practices and support for moves to raise standards in the financial services industry, and to the community.	
The Honourable Jocelyn Margaret Newman	For service to the community through contributions to the development of government policies in relation to social security reform, as an advocate for women's issues, particularly in the health and welfare areas, and as a supporter of local organisations in Tasmania.	
Brother Kenneth William Payne	For service to education through leadership and representational roles in the secondary and tertiary sectors and with professional organisations, and to school Rugby Union football.	
Myra Evelin Pincott	For service to women and their families in rural and remote areas through contributions to the development of policies relating to health and welfare, aged care, local government and reconciliation.	
Professor Eric Charles Reynolds	For service to community dental health through research and development of preventative and restorative products, to dental education through curriculum development, and as an administrator and teacher.	
His Excellency David James Ritchie	For service to ensuring Australia's long-term security interests in the region through efforts to gain co-operative action to address the threat of terrorism.	
Dr Iain James Ross	For service to industrial relations through contributions to institutional reform, particularly the development of a universal superannuation system and enterprise bargaining, and as a teacher and researcher in the field.	
Geoffrey James Spring	For service to educational administration and reform, particularly through the development of national goals for schooling to improve outcomes, and in the area of vocational education and training.	
The Honourable Robert Clive Tadgell	For service to the judiciary, to the law, and to the community through contributions to higher education institutions and the Anglican Church in Australia.	
Professor Barrie Vernon-Roberts	For service to medicine as a researcher, educator and administrator, particularly in the areas of disorders of the bones and joints and pathology of the spine.	
Geoffrey David Walsh	For service to politics as National Secretary of the Australian Labor Party and to the community in the areas of tertiary education and promoting closer ties between Australia and Hong Kong.	
Richard Egerton Warburton	For service to business and commerce through contributions to a range of government and industry bodies and business enterprises, particularly in the areas of corporate governance and policy formulation, and to the community.	
The Honourable Justice Marilyn Louise Warren	For service to the judiciary and to the legal profession particularly the delivery and administration of law in Victoria, to the community in areas affecting the social and economic conditions of women and to forensic medicine internationally.	

=== Member (AM) ===
==== General Division ====
Recipient	Citation	Notes
Christopher Murray Abbott	For service to the finance industry, particularly through venture capital projects, and to the development of the biotechnology industry in Australia through entrepreneurial and advisory roles.	
Mesfin Alazar	For service to the people of the Anagu Pitjantjatjara Lands through lobbying and negotiation to improve health, education and community infrastructure.	
Dr Robert Trevor Anderson	For service to psychiatry, to the visually impaired, particularly through the Royal Victorian Institute for the Blind, and to veterans and their families.	
Mebrak Araia	For service to the people of the Anagu Pitjantjatjara Lands through lobbying and negotiation to improve health, education and community infrastructure.	
Wendy Joan Archer	For service to netball administration in New South Wales, particularly in the Hunter Region.	
Donald Campbell Bailey	For service to architecture, particularly through the Royal Australian Institute of Architects and the Board of Architects of New South Wales.	
David Alexander Baird	For service to the community, particularly through fundraising for the establishment of the Australian Ex-Prisoners of War Memorial at Ballarat.	
Bernard Douglas Banton	For service to the community, particularly as an advocate for people affected by asbestos-related illnesses.	
Carolyn Jane Barker	For service to business through management and educational organisations, and to the arts through the Queensland Orchestra.	
Robert John Beavis	For service to the mining industry, particularly through the development of more efficient and safer equipment.	
Dr Richard Alan Benn	For service to medicine, particularly as a practitioner and educator in the fields of clinical microbiology and infectious diseases.	
Dr John Michael Bennett	For service to the law, particularly in recording Australian legal history and as a biographer of eminent members of the legal profession.	
John Anthony Berger	For service to the community and to the environment through natural resource management and the promotion of sustainable agriculture practices.	
Professor Samuel Frank Berkovic	For service to medicine as a neurologist, particularly in the field of epilepsy research and treatment.	
Janet Shirley Beven	For service to the community as a foster parent and respite carer for children with a range of disabilities, and through advocacy efforts to improve access to allied health care and special education.	
Professor Elie Leslie Bokey	For service to medicine as a colorectal surgeon and through the establishment of surgical education programs, research, and medical administration.	
Howard Frederick Bolling	For service to the community through major fundraising initiatives to support medical research through the Westmead Millennium Foundation.	
Anna Marie Borzi	For service to the financial services industry, particularly as a senior analyst and manager of research activities.	
Micheli Borzi	For service to business and tourism development, particularly in far north Queensland through industry advisory bodies, local government, and community organisations.	
June Elizabeth Bothwell	For service to netball administration, particularly through the restructuring and development of Netball Queensland.	
Christopher James Brangwin	For service to education, particularly through the establishment of the International Baccalaureate Diploma Program as a recognised pre-university qualification in Australia.	
Gordon Timothy Bray	For service to broadcasting as a sports commentator, to the promotion of Rugby Union football, and to the community.	
Bryan Neathway Brown	For service to the community through a range of charitable organisations committed to providing assistance and support to families and young people and to the Australian film and television industry.	
Thomas Peter Bruce	For service to the law, particularly in the area of assessment of costs of litigation, and to post-secondary education.	
Dr Alan Lindsey Bundy	For service to librarianship in university, school and public libraries, to professional development, and to promotion of the role of librarians in educating people in the use of information resources.	
Anne Elizabeth Cahill Lambert	For service to health care administration, particularly through contributions to improve hospital services for women and children.	
Charles Arthur Campbell	For service to the community through conservation and heritage organisations in the Australian Capital Territory and the development of extended care services through St John Ambulance.	
Dr Gerard Edward Carroll	For service to medicine as a cardiologist and as a general physician, particularly through the provision of health services to regional and rural areas, and to medical education.	
Peter Ross Carthew	For service to the community of the Ararat region through involvement with civic and charitable organisations, regional development initiatives, and local government.	
Professor Ian Douglas Caterson	For service to medicine as an endocrinologist, particularly through research and clinical practice in the fields of obesity, diabetes and nutrition, and to medical education.	
Lloyd Edgar Chrystal	For service to business and commerce, and to the community particularly through health care in Western Australia.	
Emeritus Professor Robert Llewellyn Clancy	For service to cartography as a collector and curator of early maps of Australia, and to medicine in the field of immunology.	
Brian Raymond Coffey	For service to literature, particularly through the publication and promotion of the literary work of new writers.	
Glenn Andrew Cooper	For service to the food and beverage industry, and to the community through support for cultural, charitable and sporting organisations.	
Captain Silvester John Costelloe	For service to the maritime industry as a harbour master, and to the community through a range of health sector organisations.	
Professor Richard Graham Cotton	For service to science through genetic research, particularly through the development of technologies to detect gene mutations that underlie birth defects or cause disease and through efforts to document findings.	
John William Crompton	For service to local government and to the community, particularly through the Victor Harbor Council and the Southern and Hills Area Local Government Association.	
Elizabeth Sarah Crossing	For service to the community through health care consumer advocacy, and the establishment of the Breast Cancer Action Group NSW and Cancer Voices NSW.	
Dr Brian Davies	For service to occupational health and hygiene, particularly in relation to the coal industry, and through the Australian Institute of Occupational Hygienists.	
John Grant Denton	For service to the Anglican Church of Australia and to the international community through the programs of World Vision.	
John Stanislaus Doherty	For service to the community through administrative and fundraising roles with a range of hospital and health care organisations, and to the television industry.	
Bruce George Donald	For service to the law and to the community through commitment to public interest issues affecting broadcasting, the environment, Indigenous organisations, and trade practices law.	
Dr Jonathan Brookes Douglas	For service to medicine, particularly through a range of medical and administrative roles, professional organisations, and specialist training programs for physicians.	
Colin James Dwyer	For service to secondary education and to the community through the Catholic education system in New South Wales and the Australian Capital Territory.	
The Honourable John Edward Ellis	For service to the administration of justice, to the development of family law in Australia, and to judicial education.	
Dr Patrick Michael Fernando	For service to psychiatry, particularly in the field of child and adolescent mental health, and to the community through social welfare organisations.	
Ian Douglas Ferrier	For service to the administration of Rugby Union football through financial management roles, restructuring, and business development.	
Glenn Ailsa Fisher	For service to the community, particularly through the Turner Syndrome Association of Australia and the development of a range of support services.	
William John Forrest	For service to the community through support for arts and charitable organisations as a benefactor and adviser.	
Professor Hans Charles Freeman	For service to science and scientific research in the field of bio-inorganic chemistry, particularly through the establishment and development of the discipline of crystallography in Australia.	
Dr Judith Alison Fryer	For service to medicine as an anatomical pathologist, and as an educator in the field of neuropathology.	
Professor William Leonard Gammage	For service to education and to the community in the area of Australian history through teaching, writing and historical research.	
Peter Brian George	For service to surf lifesaving, particularly through administrative roles and the implementation of changes to education and training programs.	
Daniel Thomas Gilbert	For service to the law and to the community, particularly Indigenous Australians, in relation to social justice and welfare issues.	
Elizabeth Margaret Gilchrist	For service to youth through the Guiding movement and organisations that develop and promote the interests of young people.	
Professor Edgar Gold	For service to maritime law and protection of the environment as a policy developer and adviser, and through academic roles and involvement in international maritime organisations.	
Dr Donald Golinger	For service to medicine, particularly through the introduction of training programs in general surgery and the establishment of multi-disciplinary assessment and treatment services for breast disease.	
David William Grant	For service to business and commerce, to the community through promoting sport, business and charitable events, and to support for education and training programs.	
Richard Ashton Green	For service to tourism and to the community through support for a range of cultural, educational, sporting and musical events in South Australia.	
Professor Alexander Dmitrievich Grishin	For service to the visual arts and to contemporary Australian artists as an educator, critic and writer, and as an art historian.	
Dr Bruce Heath Gutteridge	For service to the development and provision of diagnostic medical pathology services, and to the community through the Friends of the Queensland Art Gallery.	
Annette Jean Hall	For service to public health and to the community through health services and rural financial counselling, particularly on the Eyre Peninsula.	
John James Hanley	For service to the wine industry as a judge, writer and educator, and to the community through the Royal Agricultural Society of Western Australia.	
Kenneth Carl Hansen	For service to the community of the Finke River Mission, particularly through the recording of the Pintupi/Luritja language and the development of educational resources to aid literacy.	
Lesley Ellen Hansen	For service to the community of the Finke River Mission, particularly through the recording of the Pintupi/Luritja language and the development of educational resources to aid literacy.	
John Hasker	For service to the energy industry and to the community through leadership roles, particularly with the Australian Red Cross Blood Service.	
Adjunct Associate Professor James Kell Hawkins	For service to dentistry, particularly as an educator and practitioner, to professional development, and to the community.	
Robert Norman Herbert	For service to industry, particularly in the areas of industrial relations reform, industry training and skills development.	
Reginald Thomas Hope	For service to state and local government, and to the community of Devonport.	
John Talbot Horder	For service to public administration, particularly financial management practices in public sector agencies, to corporate governance, and to the accounting profession.	
Major Baden Newton Jeffrey	For service to the community of Western Australia through chaplaincy services, particularly in the Fire and Emergency Services Authority.	
Professor Ian Stuart Jones	For service to medicine, particularly in the fields of obstetrics and gynaecology as an educator, practitioner and administrator, and to the Royal Australian Navy Reserve as a medical specialist.	
Jeremy Sean Jones	For service to the Jewish community, and to multiculturalism and international relations in the area of interfaith dialogue.	
Professor Brian Herbert Kay	For service to medical science and public health, particularly through research into the control and elimination of mosquito-borne arbovirus diseases in Northern Australia and Asia.	
The Reverend Dr Bruce Norman Kaye	For service to the Anglican Church of Australia, particularly as General Secretary of the General Synod and as a scholar and author of texts on theology and church history.	
Clive William Kitchin	For service to the community through the Royal Flying Doctor Service and the administration of health services for people in rural and remote areas, and to the legal system.	
Phillip George Knightley	For service to journalism, particularly as a leader in journalistic investigations and reporting of issues of public concern, and as an author.	
Venerable Master Chin Kung	For service to the Buddhist community in Queensland, particularly through the promotion of Buddhism and the fostering of interfaith activities between diverse ethnic groups, and to the community through support for educational and health institutions.	
The Honourable Dr Diana Vivienne Laidlaw	For service to the South Australian Parliament and to the community, particularly through support for the arts and improved transport systems.	
Professor Kenneth John Langford	For service to water resource management, particularly through organisations that regulate and research water supply, quality and usage.	
Dr Maxwell Gordon Lay	For service to engineering, particularly through leadership in the delivery of quality road infrastructure and the development of new contract management processes, and as an educator and historian.	
His Honour Judge Gordon David Lewis	For service to the law through the judiciary and as a practitioner, particularly in the area of professional accountability, and to the community through a range of sporting and social welfare organisations.	
Dr Brian Lawrence Lloyd	For service to medicine as a clinician, particularly as a cardiologist, and to hospital and health services administration.	
Bruce Lloyd	For service to natural resource management, particularly through the landcare movement, and to the Australian Parliament.	
Maxwell Thomas Lockwood	For service to public health through the Arthritis Foundation of Queensland and Arthritis Australia, and to the community.	
Catherine Juliet Lyons	For service to the law and to the community, particularly through assisting members of disadvantaged groups to have greater understanding of the criminal justice system.	
Peter Gilbert Mackie	For service to the agribusiness sector and Australian fodder industry through research and development, and by promoting trading links with Japan.	
Jock Alexander Mackinnon	For service to academia as an educator and administrator, and to the community through support for a range of charitable and religious organisations.	
The Honourable Robert Roy Maclellan	For service to the Victorian Parliament, particularly in the areas of planning and transport, and to the community.	
Dr Peter Walter Madden	For service to medicine through the establishment and administration of the Queensland Eye Bank.	
Dr Christopher Robert Margules	For service to conservation and the environment, particularly through innovation in the fields of biodiversity assessment and conservation planning, and through collaborating on projects at both local and international level.	
Eric John Martin	For service to conservation in the Australian Capital Territory, particularly through the ACT Heritage Council and the National Trust of Australia (ACT), and to the community.	
Rosalie Ruth Martin	For service to business and commerce, particularly through the provision of educational services to the finance sector, and to the community.	
William James Masterton	For service to the building industry, particularly in the field of residential development and housing design and construction methods, and to the community.	
Gerald Byrne Maynard	For service to the information technology industry and to education, particularly through the establishment of professional standards and accredited courses of study in vocational training institutions.	
Harry Kevin McCann	For service to the law, particularly in the areas of mining, corporate and commercial law, and to business and the community.	
Professor Sybil Jennifer McCulloch	For service to the community of South Australia through a range of organisations involved in health and aged care.	
Deborah Jane McCulloch	For service to the community as a proponent of equal opportunities for women, Indigenous Australians and people from culturally and linguistically diverse backgrounds.	
Edward Joseph McGuire	For service to the community, particularly through support for health care and welfare organisations, and to broadcasting.	
Professor Russell Gordon Mein	For service to science in the field of flood hydrology and urban water resources and for contributions to research, teaching and professional practice.	
Dr Philip Clayton Minter	For service to international relations, particularly through the promotion of commerce and trade between Australia and the United States of America.	
Michael Andrew Montgomery	For service to local government and regional development in New South Wales, particularly as a proponent for improved roads and transport links in rural areas.	
Professor Kenneth James Moores	For service to academia as an educator and administrator, and to the accounting profession though a range of financial and business organisations.	
Professor Elizabeth Agnes More	For service to education, particularly in the fields of communication, management and organisational change.	
Mary Louise Morris	For service to conservation and the environment, particularly in the field of environmental practices, and through the advancement of a multi-disciplinary approach to managing environmental change.	
Dr John Geoffrey Mosley	For service to conservation and the environment through a range of national and international World Heritage list campaigns, and the introduction of conservation legislation.	
Dr Thomas Julian Murphy	For service to the community of Longreach, particularly to the Stockman's Hall of Fame, and to a range of local organisations.	
Ronald James Murray	For service to the community as a transport operator and provider and to the tourism industry through contributions to a range of planning and development organisations.	
Colin Robert Neave	For service to public administration and to the banking and finance industry, particularly through dispute resolution.	
Clive Douglas Newman	For service to literature, particularly through the publication and promotion of the literary work of new writers.	
Associate Professor Graham Leonard Newstead	For service to medicine in the field of colorectal surgery, particularly through the development of the Colorectal Surgical Society of Australasia, the implementation of international specialist surgical training programs, and the promotion of health awareness initiatives.	
Raymond John Noack	For service to the retail motor industry, particularly through involvement with industry bodies at a state and national level.	
The Honourable Howard William Olney	For service to the law and the judiciary, particularly in relation to Indigenous land issues.	
Professor Trevor Reginald Parmenter	For service to education and to the community particularly in the design and development of vocational and best practice initiatives in the field of developmental disability studies.	
Morris John Peacock	For service to thoracic medicine, particularly as a pioneer of innovative surgical techniques and as an educator.	
Paul Joseph Perkins	For service to the community through the management of electricity, water and waste water utilities and liaison between industry, the environmental movement and international markets.	
Harry William Peters	For service to the seafood industry, particularly through addressing the interests of seafood importers and the domestic fishing industry, and as an industry representative to government food regulatory authorities, and to the community.	
Cosmo James Petrich	For service to the rural community, particularly regional and economic development on Cape York Peninsula.	
Michael Christopher Power	For service to the building and construction industry, particularly in the field of civil engineering, and to the community through roles with a range of charitable and sporting organisations.	
John Hartley Poynton	For service to the business and finance sector, particularly professional conduct and regulation, and to the community through a range of charitable institutions.	
Dorothy Edna Pryce	For service to the community, particularly through the provision of mental health services as an administrator and educator.	
The Honourable Rodney Norman Purvis	For service to the law and to the judiciary, particularly through the promotion of international law, and to the community through a range of charitable and religious organisations.	
Dr David Wyndham Quin	For service to the community in the field of housing for the disadvantaged, and to medicine as a general practitioner in Papua New Guinea.	
Peter Brian Rakich	For service to cricket as an administrator and player, and to business and commerce.	
Margaret Anne Rankin	For service to public health, particularly through the provision of information and support to people with hereditary haemochromatosis.	
Professor Stuart John Rees	For service to international relations, particularly as Director of the Centre for Peace and Conflict Studies at the University of Sydney and through the establishment of the Sydney Peace Prize.	
Professor Alexander Lyon Reid	For service to medicine as an academic, administrator and practitioner, particularly in the development of medical education and rural health in Australia.	
Dr Winston Selby Rickards	For service to medicine, particularly in the field of child psychiatry, and as a contributor to the advancement of child and adolescent mental health at a national and international level.	
William Herbert Rutledge	For service to the thoroughbred racing industry, particularly through representation on state and national organisations, and to the community of the Gosford region.	
Dr Michael Hugh Ryan	For service to medicine, particularly in the field of ophthalmology as a practitioner and researcher.	
The Honourable James Miltiadis Samios	For service to the community, particularly in the area of multicultural affairs, to the New South Wales Parliament and to the arts.	
Jillian Shirley Segal	For service to business law in Australia, particularly in the areas of financial services reform and market regulation, and to the community through a range of organisations.	
Martin Ritchie Sharp	For service to the arts as a painter and graphic designer, particularly contributing to the pop art movement in Australia and providing support for emerging young artists.	
Patrick Francis Sheehy	For service to local government through the Penrith City Council, and to the community of Western Sydney, particularly in the areas of education and health services.	
Professor Gillian Myrna Shenfield	For service to medicine, particularly in the field of clinical pharmacology and therapeutics in Australia, and to education.	
Professor Richard Shine	For service to science in the field of herpetology as a researcher and educator, and through contributions to a range of Australian and international herpetological organisations and publications.	
Jane Singleton	For service to the media and to the community through a range of industry, arts, charitable and consumer organisations.	
Professor Thomas Frederick Smith	For service to higher education, particularly research policy and administration, to science and technology development, and to science education.	
Brian Clyde Snape	For service to conservation and the environment, particularly through Trust for Nature (Victoria) and Birds Australia.	
Dr George Bryce Soutter	For service to paediatric medicine, particularly the diagnosis, management and care of children with disabilities, and to the decorative arts.	
Major Gerben Stelstra	For service to the community, through the promotion of interfaith dialogue and understanding, to ecumenical organisations, and to the Salvation Army in Australia.	
Dr Ross Sweet	For service to medicine in the fields of obstetrics and gynaecology, to professional associations and health related organisations, and to the community.	
The Reverend Peter Ashley Thomson	For service to the community through the support of projects to assist and improve social justice and community development.	
Shirley Grace Thorn	For service to agriculture and to the community in rural areas of Western Australia through contributions to a range of social, industry-based and educational organisations.	
John Thorpe	For service to the tourism and hospitality industry, particularly through the Australian Hotels Association, and to the community.	
Professor Charles Harrold Tranberg	For service to engineering, particularly in design and construction management of bulk materials handling at marine facilities in Queensland, and to education.	
Stephen Henry Wallace	For service to the Australian film and television industry as a director and to the Australian Screen Directors' Association.	
Graham Douglas Walters	For service to accountancy, to business, and to the community as a fundraiser.	
Emeritus Professor William Allen Walters	For service to reproductive medicine as an educator and researcher, and to human bioethics, particularly in the area of in vitro fertilisation.	
Rachel Claire Ward	For service to raising awareness of social justice through lobbying, mentoring and advocacy for the rights of disadvantaged and at-risk young people, and support for the Australian film and television industry.	
Dr Rodney Dennis Watkins	For service to optics and optometry through the development and manufacture of ophthalmic equipment designed for use in remote locations throughout the world.	
Dr Neville Deane Webb	For service to higher education, particularly as a language teacher and academic administrator, and to alumni affairs through promoting the importance of teaching excellence and maintaining the quality of educational standards.	
Emeritus Professor Saxon William White	For service to medicine and to medical education, particularly through the planning and development of innovative curriculum, as a researcher in the field of human physiology, and to the Hunter Valley community.	
Michael Minell Wilson	For service to the community, particularly through the United Nations International Children's Emergency Fund, and to the South Australian Parliament.	
Dr David Leon Woolley	For service to literature as a scholar and as a historian of the life and works of Jonathan Swift, and to music.	
Lawrence Allan Wright	For service to community health through the promotion and administration of organisations concerned with cancer control including the Cancer Council of Australia, the Clinical Oncological Society of Australia and the National Laryngeal Cancer Support Committee.	
Ian Garth Yates	For service to the welfare of the aged in South Australia, and to a range of community health and educational organisations.	
Dr Robert Theam Yeoh	For service to the community as an advocate for the welfare of people living with Alzheimer's disease and other forms of dementia, their carers and families, and to the aged.	

==== Military Division ====
Branch	Recipient	Citation	Notes
Navy	Captain Simon Terence Cullen	For exceptional service in warlike operations as the Chief of Staff, Headquarters Joint Task Force 633 and as the Commanding Officer of HMAS Sydney and Albatross.	
Navy	Commodore Geoffrey Alan Ledger	For exceptional service to the Royal Australian Navy and the Australian Defence Force as Director of the Aviation Capability Improvement Team and Commander Australian Navy Aviation Group.	
Navy	Commodore Matthew John Tripovich	For exceptional service to the Royal Australian Navy as Director General Navy Capability, Performance and Plans, Commodore Flotillas and Director General Navy Personnel and Training.	
Navy	Warrant Officer David Turner	For exceptional service to the Royal Australian Navy as Staff Officer Navy Reserve Policy and Warrant Officer of the Navy.	
Army	Lieutenant Colonel Ronald John Eddington	For exceptional performance as Commanding Officer of the Army Financial Services Unit in the provision of financial management and as Head of Corps, Royal Australian Army Pay Corps in personnel management performance.	
Army	Lieutenant Colonel Luke Foster	For exceptional performance as the Defence Adviser Honiara, accredited to Port Vila	
Army	Brigadier David Gordon McKaskill	For exceptional service to the Australian Defence Force in the field of capability development as Director Simulation at the Combined Arms Training and Development Centre, as Director Future Warfare in Policy Guidance and Analysis Division and as Director Land Combat in Land Development Branch, and Acting Director General Land Development.	
Army	Brigadier Aziz Gregory Melick	For exceptional service as Commanding Officer of 12th/40th Royal Tasmania Regiment and as Commander 8th Brigade.	
Army	Colonel Stephan James Rudzki	For exceptional service to the Australian Defence Force in the field of Health Services as Commanding Officer, Canberra Area Medical Unit, Staff Officer Grade One Health Capability Development in the Defence Personnel Executive, Chief of Health on the Headquarters Peacekeeping Force while deployed on the United Nations Mission of Support in East Timor, and as Director Preventive Health in Defence Health Services Branch.	
Army	Lieutenant Colonel Stephen Paul Tulley	For exceptional service to the Australian Army as the Liaison Officer to the US Marine Corps; Commanding Officer Land Command Battle School; and as the Commanding Officer/Chief Instructor Combined Arms Battle Wing, Combat Training Centre.	
Army	Colonel Phillip Thomson White	For exceptional service in the fields of leadership and training as the Commanding Officer of the Western Australian University Regiment, Project Team Leader of the Royal Military College of Australia and Commandant, Regional Training Centre, Western Australia.	
Air Force	Group Captain Terrence Charles Delahunty	For exceptional service to the Royal Australian Air Force as Officer Commanding Number 44 Wing, Project Officer for the formation of Surveillance and Response Group and Chief of Staff of Surveillance and Response Group.	
Air Force	Wing Commander Stephen James Kerr	For exceptional service as a Project Officer, Commanding Officer, Operational Commander in the Middle East and Temporary Officer Commanding Number 92 Wing to the Royal Australian Air Force Maritime Patrol and Response capability.	
Air Force	Wing Commander Gary James Martin	For exceptional service as Commanding Officer of Number 37 Squadron.	
Air Force	Air Vice-Marshal Bruce Hamilton Short	For exceptional service to the Australian Defence Force in senior appointments within the Defence Health Services, particularly as the Surgeon General to the Australian Defence Force.	

=== Medal (OAM) ===
==== General Division ====
Recipient	Citation	Notes
Gwendolyn Joan Abikhair	For service to people with disabilities through the Riding for the Disabled Association, particularly through the establishment of facilities in Albury.	
Trevor James Adams	For service to the community of Bruny Island, particularly fundraising through the Bruny Island Cork Club.	
Elsie Joy Addis	For service to the community of Nyabing through a range of service, social support and youth organisations.	
Colin John Alexander	For service to the community of Canberra, particularly through the establishment and management of a national basketball team.	
The Reverend Noel Stephen Allen	For service to the Anglican Church of Australia, particularly through providing chaplaincy services at the Queen Elizabeth Hospital.	
Robert Roy Anderson	For service to the community through local beautification schemes and ex-Service organisations.	
Eric David Anderson	For service to the community of Rockhampton through support for cultural, primary industry and service organisations.	
Ray Thomas Anderson	For service to the community through the Anglican Church of Australia, particularly through the provision of support for homeless children and youth, the aged, and people with disabilities.	
Philip Gwyther Atherton	For service to education through the administration of tertiary and further education institutions, and to the sugar industry.	
Kenneth Leslie Baggs	For service to athletics through the establishment and administration of the annual ironman triathlon in Forster-Tuncurry.	
Margaret Dorothy Baldwin	For service to youth as a sports coach and administrator, particularly with the Mosman Park Primary School.	
Geoffrey Roy Ball	For service to education, particularly promoting the study of mathematics and to professional associations.	
Margaret McNeill Banks	For service to children with vision impairments through contributions in the specialised field of behavioural optometry.	
Betty Eileen Barnes	For service to education as a teacher and consultant, particularly through contributions to dance and physical education syllabi.	
John William Barrett	For service to Rugby League football, and to the community of the Balonne Shire, particularly through local government.	
Keith Henry Barry	For service to the community of Ballina through service, veteran and horticultural organisations.	
Graeme James Barwick	For service to the community, particularly through the Association of Independent Retirees and the Uniting Church of Australia.	
Coralie May Batchelor	For service to nursing and humanitarian aid through the Nepal Plastic Surgery Program and the Adventist Development and Relief Agency.	
Norma Irene Beer	For service to people with spinal disabilities, particularly as a home visiting nurse with the Paraplegic-Quadriplegic Association of Western Australia, and through support for wheelchair sports.	
Sydney Benjamin	For service to the community, particularly through public speaking programs, Jewish communal organisations and Freemasonry.	
Helen Bersten	For service to the community as an historian, particularly through the Australian Jewish Historical Society.	
Rupert John Bills	For service to the community of Dubbo through a range of service, historical, sporting, veteran and church organisations.	
Mary Elaine Binks	For service to local government, particularly through the Devonport City Council, to the promotion of women's affairs, and to the community.	
Cecil Audley Black	For service to the community of Gladesville through the Returned and Services League of Australia in relation to meeting the needs of veterans and their families and to young people in the local area.	
Noel Edwin Blount Greene	For service to people with disabilities through the provision of vocational training and welfare support services.	
Kenneth Alexander Blyth	For service to the community, particularly through research into and preservation of historical material relating to the sugar industry.	
Shirley Margaret Bourne	For service to the community and to the visual arts, particularly as an advocate of the traditional realist style, and as a painter, teacher and adjudicator.	
Basil Clyde Bowman	For service to youth through the Scouting movement, particularly in the Goldfields region of Victoria.	
Priscilla Mary Boxall	For service to the community of Kangaroo Island, particularly through welfare, service and aged care organisations.	
Robert Lawson Boyd	For service to sport as a water polo coach, administrator and referee, and through the development of junior competitors.	
Roger Hardinge Braham	For service to the community of Tenterfield and to equestrian sport through the Pony Club Association of New South Wales.	
Janice Breen	For service to the performing arts as a choreographer and teacher and to the community through support for a range of fundraising events.	
Kathleen Lillian Brewster	For service to the community, particularly through the Council on the Ageing (NSW) Inc.	
Harold Thomas Brissenden	For service to music education, particularly through the introduction and development of techniques for teaching music to children.	
Dr Ida Bell Brodrick	For service to the community through the administration of public health programs, particularly in the areas of maternal and child health.	
Alan James Brown	For service to local government in the Wide Bay Burnett region, and to the community through tourism, training, health and sporting groups.	
David Eric Brown	For service to the communities of Strathfield and Burwood, particularly through Meals on Wheels.	
Councillor Peter Andrew Bryant	For service to local government and to the community of Rockdale.	
Arthur John Buchan	For service to education as a teacher and administrator, to Rugby Union football, and to the community.	
Elizabeth Ann Buchanan	For service to conservation and the environment, particularly through the Rozelle Bay Community Native Nursery.	
Bert Cecil Button	For service to the community as a radio broadcaster and administrator and through support for a range of charitable organisations.	
Lieutenant Colonel Ian Leslie Campbell	For service to the welfare of veterans and their families.	
Robert Elliott Campbell	For service to the community, particularly through Lions International, and to Australian Rules football.	
John Edward Carter	For service to the community of Palm Beach as a swimming teacher and lifesaver.	
Janice Dora Cass	For service to local government and to the community of Loxton Waikerie.	
Salvatore Cavallaro	For service to the community of Ingham, particularly through support for a range of service, aged care, church and educational organisations.	
Margaret Lorraine Cazalar	For service to the community, particularly through the Queensland Women's Historical Association.	
Robert Charles Chester-Master	For service to the community, particularly through a range of ex-Service, civic and charitable organisations.	
Daphne Ruth Clark	For service to the community in Tumut, particularly through contributions to health, palliative care and service organisations.	
Costas Cofinas	For service to education through the New South Wales Federation of Community Language Schools and to the community through the Greek Orthodox Parish of St Stephanos.	
Barry Gwydir Collis	For service to the community, particularly through the development and delivery of road safety education programs.	
Brian Cooke	For service to the community, particularly the welfare of veterans and their families through a range of associations.	
John Stirling Craig	For service to community health through the New South Wales Branch of Alzheimer's Australia, and to the community through the Rotary Club of Sydney.	
Ronald Allan Crew	For service to the building industry through the National Subcontractors Association, and to the community through service, school and health organisations.	
John Arthur Crone	For service to amateur fishing through the Australian Anglers Association and the Queensland Amateur Fishing Clubs Association.	
Alma Crook	For service to the community of Tenterfield, particularly as a music teacher and pianist.	
Lynne Crookes	For service to the community through the Sydney Breast Cancer Foundation.	
Sergeant Stuart James Cross	For service as part of the police joint Bali bombing investigation and victim identification process, known as Operation Alliance.	
Robert Colville Crowe	For service to sport as a Gold Medallist at the Athens 2004 Paralympic Games.	
David Thomas Currie	For service to the community through the Burns Club Scottish Country Dance Group.	
Anthony Charles Dally-Watkins	For service as part of the police joint Bali bombing investigation and victim identification process, known as Operation Alliance.	
Basil Mervyn Darby	For service to the community through the outreach programs of the Uniting Church in Australia and support for refugees.	
Dr R Bruce Davey	For service to medicine, particularly through contributions to the development of services related to treating paediatric burns victims in South Australia.	
Michael Richard Day	For service to people with disabilities through SCOPE Victoria, and to the community.	
Deborah de Wilde	For service to the community as an obstetric social worker providing support to bereaved parents.	
Michael Keith Deasey	For service to the community as a cathedral organist, choir director, composer and music teacher.	
Christopher Harry Dewhirst	For service to tourism through developing initiatives in the area of commercial adventure tourism.	
Wilfred Clyde Dews	For service to conservation and the environment and to the community of Lake Macquarie.	
Roy Kenneth Dickinson	For service to the community of Home Hill through a range of service, church, health and emergency services organisations.	
Michael George Digby	For service to the community, particularly through the Volunteer Rescue Association and the Glen Innes Natural Resources Advisory Committee.	
Dr Patricia Mary Dimmock	For service to medicine and to humanitarian aid through the Nepal Plastic Surgery Program.	
Dr Kenneth McGowen Doust	For service to medicine as a general practitioner and as an administrator.	
Gwenneth Clara Doyle	For service to the community, particularly through the Richmond Nursing Home and church organisations.	
Michael Maxwell Doyle	For service to the community, particularly through church organisations, including the St Vincent de Paul Society.	
Keith William Draper	For service to the community through Rotary International and the New South Wales Branch of the Royal Life Saving Society of Australia.	
Edwin William Dubberlin	For service to the welfare of ex-Service personnel and their families, and to the community through emergency services and sporting organisations.	
Mary Hilary Dutton	For service to the community, particularly to children through the Nyngan Pony Club.	
Peter James Dutton	For service to the community, particularly to children through the Pony Club Association of New South Wales.	
Joan Rose Dwyer	For service to the community, particularly through the DEAL Communication Centre and to the law.	
Kevin Charles Eckhardt	For service to people with disabilities, particularly through the design and manufacture of aids and equipment, and to the community of Bairnsdale.	
Jean Margaret Edwards	For service to the community, particularly through the Victorian Baptist Women's Fellowship.	
Patricia Majella Eggleston	For service to education, particularly by promoting the enhancement of multicultural relations within the community of Parramatta.	
Hugh Elford	For service to people with disabilities through a range of employment, accommodation and advocacy organisations.	
Sue Erica Fear	For achievements in mountaineering and for service to the community, particularly through support for the Fred Hollows Foundation.	
Dr Bérrès Karlene Fenton	For service to medicine as a practitioner, educator and counsellor in the areas of drug and alcohol abuse, sexual trauma and mental health.	
Victor William Fifield	For service to the community, particularly through the Camden Haven Aged Persons' Care Association.	
Ivy Elfreeda Firstenberg, MBE	For service to the community, particularly through organisations concerned with issues affecting women, migrant groups and young people.	
Karen Margaret Fitzgerald	For service to the community, particularly through the development of early intervention, assessment and treatment programs designed to prevent child abuse and neglect.	
Maurice Reeks Fitzgerald	For service to the welfare of veterans and their families, and to the community of Wollongong.	
Sister Fay Frances Flint	For service to the community, particularly through the establishment of the Toowoomba Hospice for palliative care services.	
Carmeline Yvette Forbes	For service to the Sri Lankan community of Melbourne through the Ceylonese Welfare Organisation.	
Catherine Anne Foster	For service to the community of Wagga Wagga through support for a range of health, aged care and women's organisations.	
Paul Joffre Fountain	For service to education in the Catholic school system as a teacher and choir master.	
Rabbi David John Freilich	For service to the Jewish community as a religious leader and in the fields of education and culture, and to the promotion of inter-faith relations.	
Rex Basil Fuge	For service to the community of Chiltern through a range of heritage and tourist organisations, and to local government.	
Leon Vianney Garry	For service to the community, particularly through the Volunteer Rescue Association and the Binalong Volunteer Bushfire Brigade.	
Alexander Garsa	For service to the community, particularly through the provision of honorary legal advice to ethnic community members and organisations.	
Ailsa Bonnie Gillett	For service to the community, particularly through the Life for Kids initiative, the Cana Communities, and the Jesuit Refugee Service.	
Robert Allan Glass	For service to the community of Mungindi, particularly through the restoration and preservation of local historical sites.	
Michael Kirby Gledden	For service to developing standards for the accreditation of medical and science laboratories in Australia.	
Ian Peter Goadby	For service to recreational fishing and to the conservation of endangered marine species.	
The Reverend Nanette Good	For service to the community through the provision of chaplaincy and pastoral care services.	
Mervyn Goodall	For service to the community through St John Ambulance Australia.	
Ronald Francis Goodwin	For service to the community in Peak Hill and in West Wyalong through a range of service, social welfare, church and sporting organisations.	
Terence Roy Gordon	For service to the entertainment industry, and to the community through performances for charitable organisations.	
Thomas Julius Goudkamp	For service to the legal profession through the Australian Lawyers Alliance and the Law Society of New South Wales.	
Brian Lawrence Guthleben	For service to small business, and to people with disabilities through the development and manufacture of customised powered wheelchairs.	
Edwin Habben	For service to the community of Bundamba and Ipswich, and to the Returned and Services League of Australia.	
Kusitino Halemai	For service to the victims and families affected by the bombings which occurred in Bali on 12 October 2002 and to continuing support for an international recovery program for Bali.	
Barbara Mildred Hall	For service to the community through contributions to a range of theatrical, philharmonic, choral and other musical groups, and as a church organist.	
Robert Joseph Hanley	For service to education and to the community through a range of welfare initiatives for the homeless and for children with disabilities.	
Dr Francis Victor Harder	For service to the community of the Shepparton district, particularly in the areas of adult education and health.	
Bryce Matthew Hardman	For service to business administration as a contributor to the development of education and training programs and formulating standards of professional conduct and best practice.	
Denis Harlow	For service to soccer as a player, coach, administrator and author and to the South Australian Soccer Federation and the Cumberland United and Campbelltown City Soccer Clubs.	
Janet Macgregor Hawkins	For service to the communities of Woodend and the Macedon Ranges area, particularly through the preservation of local history and heritage.	
Colonel John Sutherland Haynes	For service to the welfare of veterans and serving members of the Australian Defence Force through a range of service and ex-Service organisations.	
Ray Heaps	For service to cricket as an administrator, particularly in the Northern Rivers district of New South Wales.	
Geoffrey David Henry	For service to the community through the Volunteer Marine Rescue Association of Queensland.	
Jean Helena Heriot	For service to the community through the establishment and guidance of youth choirs and to the Kodaly music teaching program.	
Berniece Joan Hicks	For service to the community, particularly through the Cambrian Youth Choir.	
Robin Barrows Higgs	For service to music as a pianist, teacher, concert organiser, broadcaster and recording artist.	
Harvey John Hilary-Taylor	For service to recreational fishing, particularly in Tasmania as an administrator, historian and commentator.	
Harold Arthur Hitchcock	For service to the community of the Kulnura and Mangrove Mountain district through agricultural, bushfire and historical organisations.	
Dr Ralph Lionel Hockin	For service to medicine as a health services administrator and through a range of professional organisations.	
Barry John Hocking	For service to the community through the Retired Police Association of New South Wales and New South Wales Police Legacy.	
Stuart Wildon Hodgson	For service to the merino sheep industry through stud flock management and improvement, and to Rugby Union football.	
Margaret Mary Hogan	For service to the community through a range of literary, historical, health and charitable organisations.	
Maureen Audrey Holbrook	For service to arts and crafts, particularly through the preservation of embroidery and textile items.	
Rex Hume Hollioake	For service to the community of Ballarat through youth, social welfare and sporting organisations, and through support for the Australian Ex-Prisoner of War Memorial appeal.	
Richard James Hooey	For service to the community, particularly through fundraising and organising the Swansea Surf Life Saving Charity Day.	
Judith Mary Houston	For service to the community in the area of social justice and to the annual music festival, 'Organs of the Ballarat Goldfields'.	
Edward Howe	For service to the community of Penguin through a range of charitable, ex-Service and sporting organisations.	
Arthur Ross Humphries	For service to international relations through community support projects in Papua New Guinea, particularly in the Morobe Province relating to health and service organisations and the establishment of cancer treatment facilities.	
Dr Annemarie Jean Hunt	For service to education as an administrator and teacher, and to the community through a range of sporting, church and welfare organisations.	
Salvatore Ianello	For service to industry and commerce particularly through support for apprenticeship training courses and youth training programs, and to the community.	
Lilian Pearl James	For service to the community, particularly through the preservation and teaching of the Cornish language.	
Jean Jehan	For service to the community of St George, particularly in the preservation of local history through historical and heritage organisations.	
Susan Rita Jennison	For service to the community, particularly through Melbourne's Living Museum of the West and the Keilor Historical Society.	
Dr Anne Mary Jequier	For service to medicine, particularly in the fields of andrology, obstetrics and gynaecology, and as a clinician, researcher and surgeon.	
Garry Albert Johnson	For service to the community of Nambucca Heads through Rotary International and contributions to service, cultural and sporting organisations.	
Valdek Kangur	For service to the Estonian community in Australia through preservation of culture and language and contributions to church, school and youth groups.	
Diana Dundas Keach	For service to equestrian sport as a coach and administrator, and to the community through animal welfare and bushfire organisations.	
Leslie Kennedy	For service to the community of Ballarat through local government, service and local history organisations and through support for the Australian Ex-Prisoner of War Memorial appeal.	
Noel John Kennedy	For service to the sheep and wool industries in Queensland, particularly as an administrator, and to the community.	
Garry John Kerr	For service to the community as an historian, commentator and film maker, particularly relating to Tasmania's maritime and forestry industries.	
Robert Donald Kerr	For service to education and to supporting leadership training in developing countries.	
Akos Kovacs	For service to sport as a gymnastics coach and administrator, to lifesaving, and to physical education.	
Nita June Lait	For service to nursing, particularly as an administrator and through the development of medical and support services.	
Jill Margaret Lambert	For service to the Zimbabwean community in Australia by providing employment and support services through the organisation, Zimbabwe Connection.	
Henry Arthur Lang	For service to veterans and their families through a range of ex-Service organisations.	
Bertrand Spencer Lawes	For service to the community through the Scouting movement and the Glenroy Sub-Branch of the Returned and Services League of Australia.	
Janet Alma Lee	For service to the community of the Buloke Shire as a co-proprietor, journalist and photographer for the local newspaper.	
Dr Ronald Gordon Lewis	For service to medicine, particularly in the field of cardiology as a clinician, educator and administrator, and to the community.	
Alan David Lillecrapp	For service to the community of the Barossa Valley through a range of service, church, environmental and health organisations.	
Krystyna Luzny	For service to the Polish community in Australia through a range of cultural, historical and ex-Service organisations.	
John Ranken Lyle	For service to local government and to the community of Gunnedah.	
Michael John Lyne	For service to the community of Inverell through aged care and sporting organisations.	
Frank William Lyons	For service to education, particularly Technical and Further Education in regional Victoria, and to the community through a range of service and church organisations.	
Jean Irene Macaulay	For service to senior citizens in the Canberra community through the activities of the Monday Club.	
Franz Mairinger	For service to the community of the Shoalhaven area through Lions International and through support for health, emergency services and sporting facilities.	
Constantine Malanos	For service to the Greek community in Australia, particularly through St Basil's Homes for the Aged and the Australian Hellenic Educational Progressive Association, and to education.	
The Reverend Dr Edwin David Manton	For service to the community through a range of ministries within the Uniting Church in Australia.	
Eusebio Marcocci	For service to the community, particularly through the fundraising projects of My Room at the Royal Children's Hospital in Melbourne.	
Dennis Lionel Marsden	For service to the sport of full-bore rifle shooting in Western Australia.	
Barry Francis Martin	For service to ex-Service personnel and their families through the Vietnam Veterans' Federation of Australia.	
Brian Francis Matthews	For service to the community of Devonport, particularly through sporting clubs and associations.	
Bryce Maxwell Matthews	For service to veterans and their families through a range of ex-Service organisations, and to the community, particularly through the Scouting movement.	
Arnold Eric Mattson	For service to the community of Newcastle, particularly youth through brass band music.	
Robert Norman McDonald	For service to the auditing profession, particularly through the Institute of Internal Auditors.	
Paul McDonald Smith	For service to the visual arts as a painter and lecturer and to the Victorian Artists Society.	
Albert Geoffrey McElhinney	For service to country music and to the community, particularly through support for senior citizens' groups.	
Dr Elisabeth Lucia McIntyre	For service to the community as a lactation consultant and counsellor, and through the development and delivery of information and education courses on breastfeeding.	
Donald Alexander McKerrell	For service to people with intellectual disabilities through the Crowle Foundation.	
Josephine Janet McKerrell	For service to people with intellectual disabilities through the Crowle Foundation.	
Dr Phyllis Winifred McKillup	For service to the visual arts as an artist and art historian and to the community.	
Joan Neville McLellan	For service to the community of Warwick through a range of social welfare, cultural, service and school organisations.	
Sister Mary Brigid McNamara	For service to the community, particularly in the area of aged care, and through the Sisters of St Joseph.	
Julie Meadows	For service to the community through the Write Your Story program of the Makor Jewish Community Library.	
Ernest Leonard Meakins	For service to the community of Kangaroo Island, particularly through the local Lions Club.	
Charles Witney Medwin	For service to people with disabilities through the Nepean Centre for the Physically Handicapped and the 4th Frankston Scout Group, and to the community of Seaford.	
Pauline Merritt	For service to the community of Tailem Bend, particularly through the activities of the local Rotary Club.	
Keith Frederick Messenger	For service to the community through a range of church, youth and sporting organisations.	
Victor Noel Meurant	For service to horticulture, particularly through the establishment of the Centre for Dry Tropics Agriculture, and to the community.	
Rosemary Clare Milisits	For service to the food industry, and to the community through support for a range of charitable organisations.	
Vilmos Milisits	For service to the food industry, and to the community through support for a range of charitable organisations.	
Rowley Charles Miller	For service to the community of Mount Gambier through a range of ex-Service, commerce, welfare and cultural organisations.	
Laurence Mizzi	For service to the sugar industry through the development of mechanical sugar cane harvesters.	
Annette Elizabeth Moehead	For service to the community in the Northern Rivers area of New South Wales, particularly people with dementia, through the development of care and support services.	
Sister Maria Mooney	For service to international relations by providing support to the community of the Sandaun Province of Papua New Guinea, particularly through the educational, health and welfare programs of the Catholic Church.	
William Richmond Morris	For service to the community of the Australian Capital Territory, particularly through The Smith Family.	
Ian James Morris	For service to environmental education and to the Indigenous communities of Northern Australia.	
Reginald Francis Morrison	For service to tourism, conservation and the environment in the western areas of Tasmania.	
Graeme Lewis Morrison	For service to the community of the Sutherland Shire through a range of sporting organisations, and to the University of Sydney Pathology Museum.	
David William Morrow	For service to the media as a sports broadcaster and commentator, and to the community.	
Winifred Emaline Mott	For service to the community through a range of organisations, to the collection and preservation of historic garments and lace, and to the recording of local histories.	
Victor Edward Mourambine	For service to the Indigenous community of the Murchison-Gascoyne region.	
Dr Doreen Musgrave	For service to dentistry, particularly in the field of paediatric dental care as a practitioner, educator and historian.	
Peter Anthony Neall	For service to the community, particularly through a range of horseracing, sporting and charitable organisations.	
Dianne Lesley Neville	For service to the community of Wellington, particularly through a range of organisations related to first aid, emergency service, church and youth activities.	
Judy Elizabeth Newnham	For service to the community through the Australian Red Cross.	
Irvine John Newton	For service to the pharmacy profession and to the community, particularly through promoting harm minimisation programs.	
Archibald Nicholson	For service to the surf lifesaving movement, particularly through administrative and training roles.	
John Anthony Nolan	For service to education and to the community of Scarborough.	
John Desmond O'Connell	For service to primary industry, particularly the wool industry, and to the community through environmental and conservation organisations.	
John Vincent O'Neil	For service to the media as a racing commentator and journalist.	
Nanette Margaret Oates	For service to environmental management through the development of conservation programs and policies, and to the community through education about fire safety.	
Margaret Leila Osborne	For service to the community of St Helens through a range of sporting, recreational and school organisations, and to local government.	
Christine Vera Ostermann	For service to the community, particularly through public relations roles and fundraising for children's health organisations.	
Jean Blyth Panton	For service to the community through medical research, and to the conservation of the environment.	
William Joseph Parsons	For service to public sector management and administration, particularly as a contributor to the development of emergency management and disaster recovery strategies.	
Colonel Francis Charles Pearson	For service to the community, particularly through the development of the 4th/19th Prince of Wales Light Horse Regimental Museum.	
John Pease	For service to business and commerce and to the community of Burnie, particularly through service, youth and sporting organisations.	
Terrence Peek	For service to people with disabilities through the facilitation of opportunities to learn sailing.	
Stephen Richard Peers	For service to the community through St John Ambulance Australia.	
Major Ronald Edmund Perkins	For service to ex-Service personnel and their families, and to the community.	
John Bernhard Perry	For service to the community, particularly through a range of musical, church and disability support organisations, and to education.	
Priscilla Ann Pescott	For service to local government, including promoting the participation of women, and to the community, through educational, water resource and cultural organisations.	
Hazel Julia Phillips	For service to the entertainment industry, particularly in the areas of the performing arts and television, and to the community as a fundraiser for charitable groups.	
Patricia Clare Phillips	For service to people with intellectual disabilities and their families through developing support and recreational facilities and programs.	
Bernard James Plew	For service to the community of Darwin through service organisations including Rotary International and the Probus Club of Darwin.	
Pauline Elsie Powell	For service to the community of Rye, particularly through a range of heritage, sporting and service organisations.	
Percy William Price	For service to the community through a range of social welfare, disability support and sporting organisations.	
John Frederick Prince	For service to the community, particularly to the welfare of veterans and their families, and through the Windsor Bowling Club.	
Colin Douglas Purcell	For service to Rugby League football in the Illawarra district.	
The Reverend Father Terence Joseph Purcell	For service to the Catholic Church, particularly through the restoration of St Benedict's Church, Broadway.	
David Albert Purchase	For service to business and commerce through employer, industry and insurance organisations.	
Nell McLeod Pyle	For service to the community of Maitland, particularly through the recording and preservation of social history using a range of media including period fashion displays, theatre and writing.	
Dr Norman Thomas Pyle	For service to education, particularly through the Association for Students with Specific Learning Difficulties/Disabilities (SPELD), Queensland, and to the community.	
Elizabeth Bridget Raines	For service to the community of Mount Wilson, particularly through a range of environmental, horticultural, civic and church activities.	
Gilbert Murray Ralph	For service to the community through the preservation and recording of Australian mining history.	
Dr John Spurgeon Ratcliffe	For service to engineering education as an administrator, teacher and scientist, and to the community.	
Edna Mary Redman	For service to people with disabilities, particularly through the Spastic Centres of South Australia.	
Joe Harry Richardson	For service to industry and commerce in the electrical contracting sector, particularly industrial relations through employee training and development, and to the community.	
Patricia Edith Richardson	For service to industry and commerce in the electrical contracting sector, particularly industrial relations through employee training and development, and to the community.	
Esma Hilda Robinson	For service to the community of Coonamble, particularly through service organisations.	
Kenneth George Robson	For service to cricket as an administrator, coach and selector, and to the community of Goulburn.	
Clive William Rogers	For service to local government, to natural resource management, and to the community of Mirani Shire in North Queensland.	
Dr Michael John Rudd	For service to medicine as a burns specialist, and for service through the provision of immediate medical assistance to victims of the bombings which occurred in Bali on 12 October 2002.	
Thomas Henry Sault	For service to the community of Mornington Peninsula, particularly through the promotion and protection of the natural environment.	
Nancy Saunders	For service to the community of Newcastle through charitable activities with the Church of Good Shepherd.	
Pastor Russell John Saunders	For service to Indigenous art and to the communities of Taree and the greater Manning Valley region.	
Janet Patricia Savage	For service to local government and to the community of the Shire of Gnowangerup through a range of tourism, historical, sporting and civic organisations.	
John Dale Savage	For service to sport, particularly for school children, and to the wider community of Ballina.	
Mary Patricia Schroder	For service to the community, particularly through fundraising for charitable organisations.	
Eda Dorothy Schurmann	For service to the community through music education and through the Caulfield Branch of the Musical Society of Victoria.	
Robert Scott	For service to the credit union movement and to the community through a range of service, pipe band and school organisations.	
Sister Shirley Kathleen Sedawie	For service to the promotion of inter-faith relations and understanding.	
Vanessa Mary Seekee	For service to the community, particularly through recording the role and experiences of the Service personnel and people of the Torres Strait during World War II.	
Professor Ronald Sekel	For service to health through technological development of a hip replacement prosthesis.	
Craig Ronald Servin	For service as part of the police joint Bali bombing investigation and victim identification process, known as Operation Alliance.	
Stephanie Frances Shannon	For service to paediatric nursing, particularly through providing innovative models for patient care, and to child welfare through the programs SCAN and PACT.	
Carlyle Lee Sherriff	For service to the community of Deloraine and to the Anglican Church in Australia.	
David Arthur Short	For service to sport as a Gold Medallist at the Athens 2004 Paralympic Games.	
Derek Brian Sims	For service to the welfare of veterans and their families in the Murwillumbah area.	
Malgorzata Skalban	For service to the community, particularly through multicultural and aged care organisations.	
Margot Elizabeth Smart	For service to local government through the Launceston City Council, to the thoroughbred horseracing industry, and to the community.	
Raymond Leslie Smee	For service to amateur sport, particularly water polo, as an administrator, coach, referee and competitor, and to the community.	
John Smith	For service to local government through Etherige Shire Council and to regional development in Far North Queensland.	
Noel Hopetoun Smith	For service to the community through service clubs and animal welfare organisations.	
Roy Kenneth Smith	For service to the welfare of ex-Service personnel and their families, particularly through the Returned and Services League of Australia.	
Margaret Rowena Smithers	For service to the community, particularly through the Australian Red Cross.	
Alfred Ernest Snell	For service to the community, particularly through service, youth, aged care and sporting associations, and to local government.	
Shirley June Stackhouse	For service to horticulture as a journalist, author, broadcaster and lecturer.	
Dr Edward Gregory Stafford	For service to medicine in the field of cardio-thoracic surgery as a clinician, administrator and teacher.	
Onella Stagoll	For service to community health through BreastScreen Victoria, focusing on education and awareness of services available to women in rural areas and those from culturally diverse backgrounds.	
Beryl Steel	For service to the community of Mascot through school and sporting organisations.	
Gordon Eric Steele	For service to the community through a range of ex-Service organisations.	
Nellie Dulcie Steele	For service to the community through a range of ex-Service organisations and church groups.	
Grace Emily Stell	For service to the community of Benalla through the use of art and craft as fundraising for charitable organisations.	
Robert Fraser Stewart	For service to the community, particularly through the Hamilton Pastoral and Agricultural Society and as a founder of 'Sheepvention'.	
George Bayfield Stone	For service to the community of Balmain, particularly through sporting and youth organisations.	
James Leslie Storey	For service to the fishing industry through the development of Queensland fisheries.	
Gwendolyn Estelle Summers	For service to the community, particularly as a fundraiser for aged care services.	
Desmond Alwyn Taege	For service to school sport, particularly Rugby League football as a coach and administrator.	
Tom Tehan	For service to the community of Seymour through bushfire, service, church and sporting organisations.	
Francis Jack Thompson	For service to the community of Mount Victoria through bushfire, school, church and sports organisations.	
Malcolm McGregor Thomson	For service to the building and construction industry, particularly as an educator in the Technical and Further Education system, and to the community.	
Doreen F H Thorpe	For service to the community of Brimbank City, particularly as an honorary justice and through children's and senior citizens' organisations.	
Lorraine Wendy Tiddy	For service to the community, particularly through the Peter Nelson Leukaemia Fund, and through pastoral care roles in the Mitchell Park area.	
John Wilson Tindale	For service to ex-Service personnel and their families, and to the community of Rylstone.	
John Ernest Tink	For service to the community of the Central West of New South Wales through the establishment of sports and recreational facilities and activities for young people.	
Giovanni Toscan	For service to the community, particularly through the Lions Club of Darlington Point.	
Noel John Trevaskis	For service to the community, particularly through the Australian Rotary Health Research Fund in raising public awareness of mental health issues in rural areas.	
John Charles Tucker	For service to the community of Maitland through a range of service and social welfare organisations.	
Norma Doris Tucker	For service to the community of Maitland through a range of service and social welfare organisations.	
Dennis Errol Tull	For service to the community, particularly through the Newcastle Police Rescue Squad.	
James Lovick Tyrrell	For service to primary industry, particularly the livestock sector, and to the community through bushfire, rural show and welfare groups.	
Terry Underwood	For service to the community, particularly through business and in promotional and cattle industry roles.	
Ian Gordon Usher	For service to the community of the Shellharbour district, particularly through the Warilla-Shellharbour Branch of the Arthritis Foundation of New South Wales.	
Michael James Victor	For service to cycling, particularly as an administrator, technical official and event organiser.	
John Anthony Vines	For service as a contributor to the development of brown coal mining in the Latrobe Valley, and to the community of the Gippsland region.	
Norman Edward Wadeson	For service to the community, particularly as a contributor to the development of the Puffing Billy Railway.	
Tetsuya Wakuda	For service to the community and the development of Australian cuisine as a chef, restaurateur and author, to vocational training, and to support for charitable groups.	
Mary Ann Walsh	For service to people with disabilities, particularly through advocacy and advisory roles, and to the community of Bundaberg.	
Dr Michael Warczak	For service to the community, particularly as a contributor to Ukrainian humanitarian and development causes, and through support for a range of cultural and charitable organisations.	
Jonathon Richard Wardill	For service to medicine in the Northern Territory, and through the provision of lifesaving surgery to patients following the bombings in Bali which occurred on 12 October 2002.	
Judith Washington	For service to librarianship, and to the community through the conservation and preservation of local history material, particularly relating to the Lane Cove district.	
Pamela Helen Weaver	For service to the community in the field of animal welfare, particularly through the provision of dog shelter facilities in the City of Stonnington.	
Hilda Enid Webster	For service to people with intellectual disabilities and their families, particularly through the Carinya Society.	
Bruce Everest Welch	For service to swimming as a referee and administrator and through the education of technical officials.	
Cedric Bayford Wells	For service to the ageing as President of Cottage Homes Inc, and to the community through ex-Service, military history and religious organisations.	
Neil Francis Werner	For service to the performing arts, particularly through the Australian National Piano Award, and to the community of the Goulburn Valley district through health, aged care and welfare organisations.	
Beryl Jean Whittle	For service to youth through leadership roles in the Scouting movement and fundraising.	
Tracey Lee Wickham	For service to Australian swimming and to the development of young swimmers through teaching and coaching roles.	
Heather Margaret Wilford	For service to the community, particularly through the Uniting Church Mayflower Retirement Village.	
Arthur Francis Wilks	For service to sport, particularly table tennis through coaching athletes with a disability, to sports administration, and to the community through Volunteering ACT.	
Iris Margaret Williams	For service to the community of the Sunshine Coast through a range of emergency services, church and welfare organisations.	
Commander Lindsay Gordon Wilson	For service to veterans and their families, and to the community through contributions to museums recording naval history.	
Emilie Eleanor Wilson	For service to the community, particularly through the Country Women's Association of Victoria and the Pan Pacific and South East Asia Women's Association.	
Barbara Joan Wilson	For service to the community, particularly youth, as a foster carer to children with diverse needs.	
Doris May Wilson	For service to the community of Brunswick Heads through a range of service, church and women's organisations.	
Leslie William Wilson	For service to the community of Brunswick Heads through a range of welfare, ex-Service and church organisations.	
Dr Paul Fairbrother Windle	For service to the community of Bega through organisations including Rotary International, the Bega District Hospital Board and the Bega Sister City Program.	
Professor Lindon Michael Wing	For service to medicine, particularly in the areas of clinical pharmacology and hypertension.	
Robert Martin Wohlenberg	For service to the community, particularly through youth and service organisations.	
Philip Malcolm Wollen	For service to international humanitarian relief and to animal welfare, particularly through the establishment of the Winsome Constance Kindness Trust.	
David John Wood	For service to local government, particularly the Wingecarribee Shire Council, and to the community through a range of tourism and sporting organisations.	
Elaine Wright	For service to the community, particularly through Heart Support Australia's exercise program for cardiac patients at the Canberra Hospital.	
Maurice Victor Wright	For service to the community, particularly through Heart Support Australia's exercise program for cardiac patients at the Canberra Hospital.	
Margaret Catherine Yeatman	For service to the community, particularly youth, as a foster carer to children including those with disabilities.	
Dr Barry York	For service to the community through research into and recording of aspects of Australian immigration, particularly Maltese migration.	
Maria Zawada	For service to the Polish community in South Australia through organisations including the Adelaide Polish Seniors' Club, the Polish Ex-Servicemen's Association and the Polish Women's Association.	

==== Military Division ====
Branch	Recipient	Citation	Notes
Navy	Warrant Officer Peter James Kenworthy	For meritorious service to the Royal Australian Navy in the fields of dental health care and dental category development.	
Navy	Warrant Officer Garry Noel Osborne	For meritorious service as Officer-in-Charge of Minesweeper Auxiliary Wallaroo and services to the Mine Warfare Branch.	
Army	Major Dixie Anne Duggan	For meritorious service to the Australian Army performing the duties of Senior Nursing Officer 1st Field Ambulance, 8th Brigade Administrative Support Battalion and 8th Combat Service Support Battalion.	
Army	Major Mary-Rose Mulvaney	For meritorious service as the Officer Commanding the Australian Defence Force School of Catering and as Staff Officer Grade Two Personnel/Logistics Headquarters Royal Military College of Australia.	
Army	Warrant Officer Class 1 Christopher Douglas Reeves	For meritorious service to the Army as the Master Sapper, Headquarters Land Command Engineers, Regimental Sergeant Major of the 8th Brigade, 21st Construction Regiment and the 1st Combat Engineer Regiment, as part of the United Nations Mine Clearance Training Team in Afghanistan and as an exchange officer to the United Kingdom.	
Army	Warrant Officer Class 1 Peter Kevin Robb	For meritorious service in the field of trade and training management at the Army Logistic Training Centre.	
Army	Warrant Officer Class 1 Bernard Franciscus Vandenhurk	For meritorious service as the Regimental Sergeant Major of 11th/28th Battalion, The Royal Western Australia Regiment, 1st Battalion, The Royal Australian Regiment and AUSBATT VIII Operation Citadel.	
Air Force	Warrant Officer Richard James Bohr CSM	For meritorious service as the Warrant Officer Engineer on C130 Hercules aircraft.	
Air Force	Flight Sergeant Ronald Jacob Van Den Hurk	For meritorious service as the Deployment Maintenance Supervisor at Number 3 Control and Reporting Unit.	
