= Jeremy Leibler =

Australian lawyer (born 1979)

Jeremy David Leibler (born in 1979) is a Partner at Arnold Bloch Leibler and a member of the Australian Takeovers Panel. He has been President of the Zionist Federation of Australia, an elected representative roof body of the Australian Jewish Community since 2018. In 2023, Leibler was named by the Australian Financial Review as one of Australia's top 25 private capital dealmakers.

== Early life and education ==
The son of Mark and Rosanna Leibler, Leibler graduated from Monash University with first class honours in law and was the recipient of the Supreme Court Prize for the best honours student. He was editor of the Monash University Law Review in 2002.

== Legal career ==
Leibler joined Arnold Bloch Leibler in 2003 as an articled clerk. He was made senior associate in 2009 and partner in 2011.

He is involved in activism related to corporate mergers and acquisitions, capital markets, and shareholders. Leibler acts for clients including Solomon Lew and Premier Investments Limited, Ruslan Kogan and Kogan.com, and Alex Waislitz and Thorney Investment Group. He has been instrumental in many activist campaigns in relation to ASX listed companies such as AMP, Myer, Cromwell Property Group and VGI Partners.

In 2016, he partnered with Activist Insight to produce a report providing an analysis of activist investing trends in Australia. He regularly lectures at universities and presented a lecture in Corporations Law at Monash University in 2023, where he examined legal and commercial strategies and tactics relevant to shareholder activism.

He is a member of the Australian Takeovers Panel, having been appointed by the governor general, the Hon Sir Peter Cosgrove, in 2015. In April 2024, he was reappointed for a three-year period.

He is a non-executive director of ASX listed Thorney Technologies Limited and a director of the Spotlight Foundation.

He is a member of the Corporations Committee of the Business Law Section of the Law Council of Australia, a member of the Australian Institute of Company Directors and of the International Bar Association.

== Community work ==
In November 2018, Leibler was elected as the President of the Zionist Federation of Australia.

He is a former Deputy Chair of Leibler Yavneh College and has served on the boards of numerous organizations within the Jewish community, including the United Jewish Education Board, Zionism Victoria, and is a former chairperson of the Zionist Young Council of Victoria.

In 2017, Leibler led a delegation together Chris Corrigan to Israel on a business mission focusing on Agri-tech.

In October 2019, Leibler led a delegation to Israel together with John Howard, Alexander Downer, Brendan Nelson, Wayne Swan and Stephen Conroy where they met with Benjamin Netanyahu and Reuven Rivlin.

In 2020, Mr Leibler was appointed a member of the Board of Governors of the Hebrew University of Jerusalem.

In September 2022, Leibler was in Israel where he met Israeli President Isaac Herzog and Alternate Prime Minister Naftali Bennett who he invited to visit Australia.

In February 2023, Leibler spoke at the Knesset at a global antisemitism forum.

In 2025, Leibler was chosen to sit on the 150-person Voice of the People council.

== Honors and awards ==
Leibler is recognised for his expertise in corporate/M&A and capital markets in Chambers Asia Pacific and The Legal 500 Asia Pacific. He is recognised by Best Lawyers International in the area of commercial law and has been ranked by Doyle's Guide Australia as ‘pre-eminent’ in the categories of private equity and corporate/M&A in Melbourne.
