= Ringers Western =

Australian western wear and workwear brand

- Type: Unlisted public company
- Industry: Apparel
- Founded: 2012; 14 years ago (Kimberley region, Western Australia)
- Founders: Andrew Macdonald, James Salerno Jnr, Anika Salerno
- Headquarters: Burleigh Heads, Queensland, Australia
- Key people: James Salerno Jnr (CEO), Emma Salerno (executive director)
- Products: Western wear, workwear, shirts, jeans, boots, hats, accessories
- Owner: Ringers Western Discretionary Trust
- Website: www.ringerswestern.com

Ringers Western is an Australian clothing company specialising in western wear and rural workwear, including shirts, jeans, boots, hats and accessories. Aimed at Australian ringers and cowboys as well as urban customers drawn to country style, the brand is headquartered at Burleigh Heads on the Gold Coast and has grown into one of Australia's best-known country-apparel labels. The company is controlled by the Ringers Western Discretionary Trust, whose named trustees have included members of the Salerno family; one of them, James Gino Salerno, leads the group known as the "Ideal Human Environment" and has been convicted of child sexual abuse.

== History ==
By the company's own account, Ringers Western originated around a campfire on a cattle station in the Kimberley region of Western Australia, where station workers frustrated by clothing that could not withstand station conditions discussed making their own gear. The brand is most commonly dated to 2012, although founder Andrew Macdonald has in at least one interview dated the launch to 2016. Macdonald, a military veteran and former station pastoral manager, is credited with building the idea into a business, initially hand-packing orders from a lounge room; the brand grew quickly on social media among young rural Australians.

James "Hawkeye" Salerno Jnr and Anika Salerno are also described as co-founders, and James Salerno Jnr has served as the company's chief executive officer.

== Products and market ==
Ringers Western designs and sells men's, women's and children's apparel, including work shirts and T-shirts, denim jeans, jackets, hoodies, dresses, boots, and a large range of hats and caps, along with accessories and a camping range. The brand emphasises durability, bright colours and an outback identity, historically using images of working stockpeople rather than fashion models in its marketing.

The company sells through its own retail stores, an e-commerce operation and a wholesale network, and is also stocked by third-party retailers such as Anaconda and specialist western stores. It has expanded into the United States. Company-linked sources describe more than 350 wholesale accounts and a valuation exceeding A$60 million; these figures derive from company and promotional material rather than independent audit.

== Ownership and corporate structure ==
The brand's principal corporate vehicle is Ringers Western Limited, formerly named BrandUp Limited, an unlisted Australian public company. As recorded by the Takeovers Panel in 2024, the company had approximately 106 shareholders, with control resting in the Ringers Western Discretionary Trust ("RW Trust"). A minority interest was held by a group of investors led by Bombora Investment Management.

In February 2022, Ringers Western Limited agreed to acquire the operating company Ringers Western Pty Ltd from the RW Trust in conjunction with a A$15 million capital raising. After completion in March 2022, the RW Trust held 63.31 per cent, the Bombora group 23.05 per cent, and other shareholders 13.64 per cent. From August 2023 the board comprised Emma Salerno, James Salerno Junior and Clifford Savala, all nominated by the RW Trust.

On 2 April 2024 the company issued 687,959,705,932 "bonus shares" to the RW Trust, lifting the trust's voting power from 63.31 per cent to 99.94 per cent and diluting other shareholders to nominal levels. Bombora applied to the Takeovers Panel, which on 4 June 2024 declared the issue to be unacceptable circumstances, found that it contravened section 606 of the Corporations Act 2001, and ordered the bonus shares cancelled. A review panel affirmed the declaration and orders in September 2024. The initial panel flagged an "inherent conflict" at board level, since the trustees to whom the shares were issued were also company directors, and noted that the company and the trust had connections to the same law firm, Salerno Law.

A shareholder resolution passed at the company's annual general meeting on 7 March 2022, quoted in the panel's reasons, approved issuing consideration shares to "James Gino Salerno, Matteo Thade Salerno and Emma Salerno as trustees for the Ringers Western Discretionary Trust".

== Connection to the Ideal Human Environment ==
The "Ideal Human Environment" (IHE) was a group founded in the early 1980s by James Gino Salerno, a Vietnam War veteran and former schoolteacher known to followers as "Taipan". Described in media reporting as a cult, the group at its peak numbered around 30 members and ran daily meetings between 2001 and 2008 at a mansion at Aldgate in the Adelaide Hills, before relocating to Queensland and later to Kununurra in the Kimberley.

The Australian Broadcasting Corporation reported in August 2019 that the group had "strong business ties across rural Australia, including a law firm, clothing label and pastoral business", and that "in 2012, members also helped to form outback clothing company Ringers Western". James Gino Salerno is the father of Ringers Western co-founder James Salerno Jnr.

James Gino Salerno was found guilty in 2019 of unlawful sexual intercourse with a child and sentenced to ten years' imprisonment. He successfully appealed in 2020 and was granted a retrial. Following the retrial, a jury convicted him on six counts in October 2021, and on 16 December 2021 he was resentenced to seven years and eleven months' imprisonment, with a non-parole period of about six years. The sentencing judge said he had used a position of trust to abuse the victim and had shown no contrition.

The links between the Salerno family and the IHE group have prompted periodic calls on social media for consumers to boycott Ringers Western. These consumer-boycott claims are largely confined to social media and user-generated content and are not, in that form, corroborated by mainstream reporting, though the underlying links reported by the ABC and recorded by the Takeovers Panel are documented in reliable sources.

== Sponsorships ==
Ringers Western has sponsored professional sporting teams, including the Brisbane Broncos, Gold Coast Titans, South Sydney Rabbitohs, the Hawthorn Football Club and the Canterbury-Bankstown Bulldogs, and has held naming rights to rodeo events. It has run brand collaborations, including an apparel range with Bundaberg Rum, and has supported rural charities such as the Royal Flying Doctor Service and the McGrath Foundation.

The brand advertised on The Karl Stefanovic Show; when that program drew criticism, executive director Emma Salerno told Yahoo Lifestyle the company would continue its sponsorship, citing "freedom of speech" and the company's "Stickin' Together" motto.
