= Stella Bywaters =

Australian Salvation Army brigadier and humanitarian aid worker

Stella May Bywaters AC (1919–2009) was a brigadier in the Salvation Army. She worked at Friendship House from 1952 and in 1964 she opened the Home of Joy orphanage in Kampala, Uganda. She spent nearly 30 years there, providing humanitarian aid and support to the disadvantaged and poor.

On leave from Uganda in 1980, Bywaters attended the celebrations for the centenary of the Salvation Army in Australia with her sister, Major Marjorie Bywaters, also of the Army.

Bywaters received the Companion of the Order of Australia (AC) — Australia's highest honour — in the 2005 Queen's Birthday Honours for "service to the international community, during an unsafe and dangerous period in Uganda, through the provision of humanitarian aid and nursing care to improve the lives of the sick, poor and dispossessed and to the Salvation Army". At the time of the award, she was living in retirement at Seaforth Gardens, a Salvation Army aged care facility in Gosnells, Western Australia.

Born in Victoria in 1919, Bywaters died in Armadale, Western Australia on 19 June 2009. An obituary by Torrance Mendez in the West Australian carried the headline, "Amin feared Salvo lioness".
