= Yuval David =

American actor, filmmaker and activist

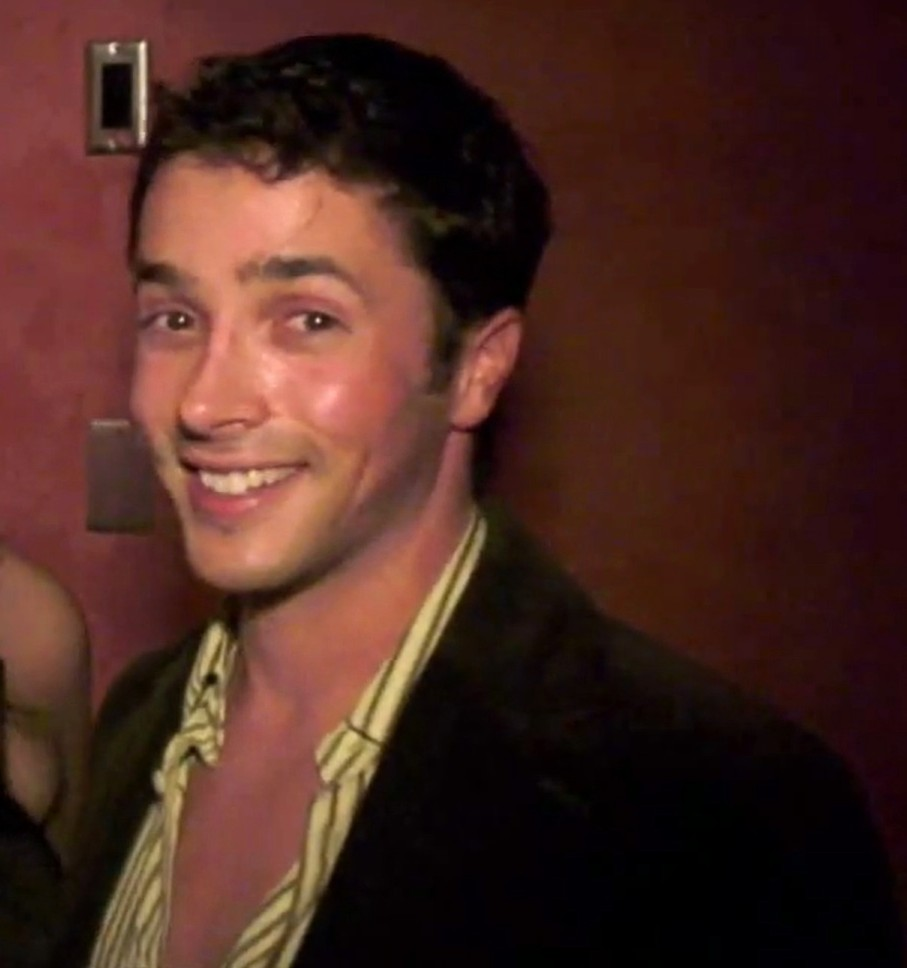
- David in 2009
- Born: Washington D.C.
- Education: University of Maryland
- Occupations: Actor, filmmaker, advocate
- Website: yuvaldavid.com

Yuval David is an Emmy-award winning actor, filmmaker, journalist, advocate and activist. As an actor, he appeared in shows such as Madam Secretary, Feud, What Would You Do?., The Michael J. Fox Show and Days of Our Lives .

== Early life and education ==
David's grandparents were survivors of The Holocaust and he was raised in both Israel and Washington D.C. He began performing in theatre, voice overs, film and television at a young age. He went to Charles E. Smith Jewish Day School prior to attending the University of Maryland on an acting scholarship where he studied the arts, film, acting, and journalism. While there he worked professionally as an actor, dancer, and journalist, in addition to performing in theatre and dance performances every semester, directing plays and productions, involved in advisory councils, and was a member of Gymkana the exhibitional gymnastics troupe. He was also a member of Kol Sasson, UMD’s premiere Jewish Acappella group.

== Career ==
=== Acting ===
After college, David moved to New York to pursue acting. He traveled between New York City and Los Angeles,living in both cities, and took roles in theatre, television, voice overs and film, including off-Broadway plays and independent films. He also played series regular, guest star, and recurring guest star roles in television, such as Matvey Sokolov in the television series Madam Secretary and was a series regular on the ABC hidden-camera show What Would You Do? playing many different characters, and was Feud on FX, The Plot Against America on HBO, Unforgettable on CBS, The Michael J Fox Show on NBC.

David is the creator of film projects using man on the street encounters. One such series is One Actor Short where he has people he meets on the street act in short films. His work has been screened at more than 100 film festivals and won over 80 awards.

=== Journalism ===
David is a news commentator appearing in Broadcast News. Appears as a commentator on U.S., Israeli, and international broadcast outlets including Fox News, Newsmax, NewsNation, ABC, NBC, Sky News, Jewish News Syndicate (JNS), and Israel’s i24, Channels 11, 12, 13, and 14. Published in outlets including The Hill, New York Post, Fox News, JNS, Algemeiner, Jerusalem Post, Times of Israel, Jewish Journal, Middle East Forum, Out Magazine, and Washington Blade. Coverage includes breaking news commentary, public policy analysis, and cultural and social issues. He speaks on Middle East, US Politics, Israel, political movements, battles with extremist terrorism, and human rights.

=== Public Speaking and Advocacy ===
David is a public speaker who discusses political and social topics pertaining to Jews, America, Israel, LGBT, human rights causes, art, culture, and entertainment. He is a motivational speaker and storyteller, guiding audiences toward media training, creativity, activism, the significance of using art for social change. David is a Jewish advocate and activist. He advises governmental and non-governmental organizations about the Jewish people and speaks on issues such as antisemitism, Jewish identity, and Israel in public, media, and policy settings.

As an activist, David advocates for rights of the LGBT community, including acceptance and inclusion of LGBTQ people within religious communities and the prohibition by the FDA on the use of blood plasma from donors based on sexual orientation. He has also partnered with organizations such as the National LGBTQ Task Force and GLAAD He also advocates on behalf of Jewish, LGBTQ, and human rights organizations in the United States and Israel. He hosted Israel’s 70th Anniversary Celebration in Times Square. David was a member of the 2025 Voice of the People cohort. He is a fellow of the Middle East Forum, speaking at conferences and writing on topics pertaining to the Middle East and global affairs.

== Personal ==
David is a Jewish American–Israeli who publicly identifies as a member of the LGBT community. He is married to Mark McDermott. In 2015, a video of David being proposed to by Mark McDermott went viral. In 2010, David visited Sachsenhausen Concentration Camp with his holocaust survivor grandfather.

== Awards ==
David is an Emmy Award winner for work in journalism and media. In 2024, he was named the “#1 Young Zionist Visionary” by the Jerusalem Post and Jewish National Fund USA. Recognized as a “Hero Against Hate” by the Anti-Defamation League (ADL). In 2022, David was announced as a notable LGBTQ leader by Crains New York.

== Filmography ==
=== Actor ===
Year	Title	Role	Notes
2017-2018	Madam Secretary	Actor	Matvey Sokolov
2011-2018	What Would You Do?	Actor	Series regular
2014	The Michael J. Fox Show	Actor	Reoccurring character (David)
2008-2009	Days of Our Lives	Actor	Reoccurring character (David)

=== Filmmaker ===
Year	Title	Director	Writer	Producer	Notes	Ref.
2021	Wonderfully Made	Yes	Yes	Yes	Documentary	
2019-2020	One Actor Short	Yes	Yes	Yes	Television series	
2018	Better World with Yuval David	Yes	Yes	Yes	Television series	
2017	What Makes You Beautiful	Yes	Yes	Yes	Television series	
2014	Pranks of Kindness	Yes	Yes	Yes	Television series	
