= Voice of the People (Israel) =

Israeli initiative

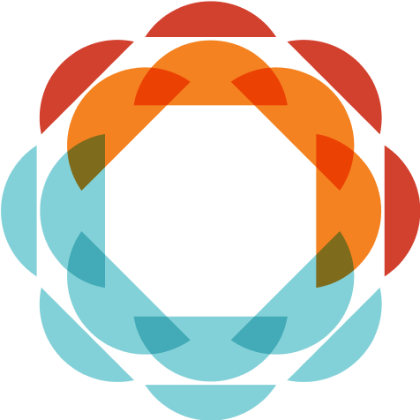
- Genre: conference
- Frequency: biennial
- Location: Jerusalem
- Country: Israel
- Years active: 2025-
- Founder: Isaac Herzog
- Website: www.voiceofthepeople.network/home-en/

Voice of the People is an initiative of Israeli President Isaac Herzog to gather a range of Jewish voices from all over the world to discuss issues and challenges affecting the Jewish people and to transform this dialogue into actionable strategies.

== History ==
In April 2023, Herzog announced the plan to establish a worldwide Jewish advisory council under his office. It was announced at a joint session of the Jewish Federations of North America, the Jewish Agency for Israel, the World Zionist Organization, and Keren Hayesod in honor of Israel’s 75th Independence Day. The goal of the project is to open dialogue between Jewish communities across the world and advise the President on challenges facing them. The Jewish Agency and World Zionist Organization were announced as partners. Subsequently, it was announced that philanthropic foundations including the Azrieli Foundation, the Patrick and Lina Drahi Foundation and the Wilf Family Foundations were partnering with this initiative.

The first stage of this was a consultation process in fourteen major Jewish centers, across the world. Deloitte assisted in this process. In August 2024, a global survey was conducted to determine the most urgent issues facing Jewish communities in Israel and around the world. There were over 10,000 responses to the survey.

In September 2024, in a launch event with Gal Gadot, Herzog announced that the application process for the council was open.

An algorithm narrowed the applicants down to 400 based on gender, age, religious affiliation, ethnicity and location whereby the Voice of the People team reduced it to 150. The council consists of 150 members from all over the world with each member serving a two-year term. There are 50 members from Israel, 50 from North America and 50 from the rest of the world.

In May 2025, Voice of the People published The 2025 Jewish Landscape Report, based on responses from more than 10,000 Jews from all over the world. Rising antisemitism is their most urgent concern.

== 2025 Cohort ==
In 2025, the initial intake of 150 council members was announced for the conference taking place in March. The council includes communal professionals, academics, students, rabbis, hi-tech professionals, social media influencers, and entrepreneurs, and its members hail from countries such as the U.S., Australia, South Africa, France, Brazil, the U.K., Italy, Ukraine, Argentina, Azerbaijan, and Turkey.

Some of the 2025 council includes Natalie Rens, Jeremy Leibler, Rona Kaufman, Josh Aronson, Ryan Turkienicz, Rachel Kastner, Malka Simkovich, Boris Janicek, Rabbi Mendy Chitrik, Yuval David, and Noa Rakel Perugia.
