= Leon Zwier =

Australian lawyer (born 1957)

- Born: July 1957 (age 69)
- Education: Mount Scopus Memorial College; University of Melbourne
- Occupation: Lawyer
- Employer: Arnold Bloch Leibler
- Known for: Restructuring and insolvency; High-profile dispute resolution; Pro bono advocacy
- Board member of: Bradman Foundation (Co-chair); Scanlon Foundation; Challenger Limited (former)
- Children: 4
- Awards: ARITA Fellow (2021)

Leon Zwier (born July 1957) is an Australian lawyer. He has been a partner of Arnold Bloch Leibler since 1991 and is head of the firm's dispute resolution litigation and restructuring & insolvency practices. Zwier is commonly referred to as Mr Fix-It due to his successes in resolving complex, nuanced, and delicate legal issues.

== Early life and education ==
Zwier's parents immigrated to Australia from Poland and Germany. Zwier's father ran an army disposal store and factory. His father's desire to become a lawyer, despite being unable to do so, inspired Zwier to pursue a legal career. Zwier attended Mount Scopus Memorial College and the University of Melbourne.

== Legal career ==
Zwier worked at Barker Gosling before moving to Arnold Bloch Leibler in 1991. Zwier has contributed substantially to the growth and success of Arnold Bloch Leibler. He has represented many various high-profile individuals and entities, including Richard Pratt, Trevor Kennedy, James Hardie, Rino & Bruno Grollo, Bruce Springsteen, Steve Vizard, Ray Williams, Ten Network, Tony Abbott, Bill Shorten, Josh Frydenberg and Peter Scanlon. He has also advised former Australian cricket captain Steve Smith and the Melbourne, Collingwood and Essendon Football Clubs. Zwier has developed a pre-eminent reputation in restructuring and insolvency, having acted for the voluntary administrators in Australia's largest corporate collapses, including Brashs, Ansett Airlines and Arrium. More recently, Zwier has acted for the State Government of Victoria in relation to various distressed infrastructure projects and the withdrawal from hosting the 2026 Commonwealth Games. Zwier has also facilitated the settlement of numerous complex disputes, such as the Centro class action. Zwier has written for publications such as The Australian and is the co-author of Leo Cussen Institute Advanced Negotiation Strategies Paper. He regularly presents to university students about current legal issues.

== Community work ==
Zwier is actively involved in pro bono work, supporting causes he believes in. Notably, he provided pro bono legal assistance for the estate of the late Rolah McCabe in her battle for compensation against British American Tobacco Australian Services. Zwier also assisted Brittany Higgins during the rape trial of Bruce Lehrmann and acted for actresses Eryn Jean Norvill and Yael Stone who were witnesses in Geoffrey Rush's defamation case against The Daily Telegraph. Zwier represented the six complainants in the AFL racism investigation against Hawthorn and its former coaches and staff. Zwier also helped the Essendonians Inc recover the three Brownlow medals of former player Dick Reynolds. Zwier was on the Advisory Committee of the Australian Law Reform Commission's Review of Corporate Criminal Liability and was a member of the Federal Government's Insolvency Practitioner Disciplinary Committees. He is an Appeals Conduct Commissioner of Cricket Australia's code of behaviour and is the co-chair of the Bradman Foundation and a board member of the Scanlon Foundation. Previously, he was a non-executive director of ASX listed Challenger Limited. Zwier is a member of several professional associations including Law Council of Australia and its Insolvency and Reconstruction Committee, Australian Restructuring Insolvency and Turnaround Association (ARITA), Turnaround Management Association Australia, International Bar Association's Insolvency Section and INSOL International.

== Honors and awards ==
Zwier has received numerous accolades during his career, including being recognized as a lawyer of the year by Best Lawyers, a star individual by Chambers Asia Pacific, and ‘Market Leader’ in Doyle's Guide. He has also been listed in Euromoney's Who's Who, IFLR1000 and Asialaw Leading Lawyers. In December 2021, Zwier was admitted as a Fellow of the Australian Restructuring Insolvency and Turnaround Association (ARITA).

== Personal ==
Leon Zwier has four children. His daughter, Rebecca Zwier, follows in his footsteps as a partner at Arnold Bloch Leibler. The Zwier Zig Zag on Mount Buller is named after him.
