= Jane Singleton =

Australian broadcasting and print journalist, company director

Jane Singleton AM (born 13 January 1947) is an Australian broadcasting and print journalist, company director and public relations professional.

== Journalistic career ==
Singleton began her journalistic career as a cadet at The Age newspaper in Melbourne. At 22 she went to China during the Cultural Revolution. Later she went to Hong Kong where she sub-edited the South China Morning Post. In Brazil she was correspondent for the Financial Times and The Economist and reporter for the ABC News. Singleton also wrote for the English language daily The Brazil Herald but ran foul of the Brazilian government. Her visa was cancelled and she escaped to Chile in the boot of a car three days before the assassination of President Allende.

In Australia she worked on regional ABC radio in Albury and Longreach before moving to Brisbane where she became Queensland compere for the ABC program Nationwide. In Sydney she compered City Extra and The 7.30 Report.

Singleton's career in broadcasting has spanned public broadcasting and the commercial media in Australia (2GB, ABC and SBS). She has been a Walkley Awards judge and federal vice president of the Australian Journalists Association. Career highlights include coordinating Nelson Mandela's visit to Australia in 1990 and working on the Maritime Union's communications during the Patrick waterfront dispute.

== Teaching ==
Singleton taught journalism at University of Technology Sydney, other Australian universities and at the Australian Film, Television and Radio School. She has delivered innumerable lectures and speeches on journalism, advocacy and human rights.

== Community and corporate roles ==
Singleton has directed and chaired the NRMA, the Australian Consumers Council, the Council of the National Gallery of Australia, the first Federal Presidency of the Media, Entertainment & Arts Alliance, the journalists' union and the Executive of the International Federation of Journalists. Jane chaired the international aid agency ChildFund, was on the Executive of the Australian Council for International Aid and was CEO of the Australian Reproductive Health Alliance. She was also a member of the Independent Complaints Review Panel for the ABC. Most recently Jane was CEO and Director of the Sydney Peace Foundation, which awards Australia’s only international peace prize, and she continues her consultancy in advocacy and strategic advice. Singleton is the director of her own public affairs consultancy, Jane Singleton Public Affairs Pty Ltd.

In 2020 she published What Katie Did, a biography of K. Langloh Parker, author of Australian Legendary Tales.

== Awards ==
In the 2005 Queen's Birthday Honours (Australia) Singleton was made a Member of the Order of Australia (AM) for "service to the media and to the community through a range of industry, arts, charitable and consumer organisations".

== Works ==
- Singleton, Jane (2020). What Katie Did: How a white woman in remote Australia notated an Aboriginal language and legends in the 19th century. ISBN 9780648656319.
