= Arnold Bloch Leibler =

Australian law firm

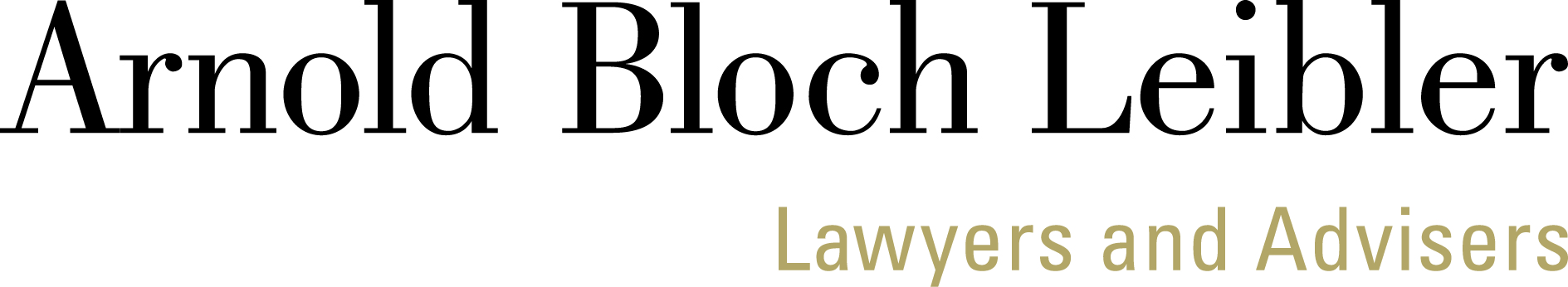
- Headquarters: Melbourne, Australia
- Offices: Sydney, Australia
- Major practice areas: Taxation Law, Commercial Law, Mergers & Acquisitions, Dispute Resolution, Public Interest Law, Property and Development Law
- Key people: Mark Leibler, Leon Zwier, Henry Lanzer, Ron Castan, Noel Pearson
- Date founded: 1953
- Founder: Arnold Bloch, Mark Leibler
- Company type: Limited liability partnership
- Website: https://www.abl.com.au/

Arnold Bloch Leibler is an Australian commercial law firm with offices in Melbourne and Sydney. They provide strategic legal and commercial advice to a diverse range of entrepreneurial Australian businesses, high-wealth individuals, private groups and international corporations.

Arnold Bloch Leibler also has a dedicated pro bono practice providing advice on social, environmental and cultural issues to more than 150 charitable and not-for-profit organisations.

The firm, being founded in 1953, has been operating for over 70 years. Its head office is located in the Commercial Bank of Australia building, at 333 Collins St in Melbourne, Victoria, Australia.

The firm is highly ranked by Australian and global indexes in each of its practice areas.

As of July 2026, the firm has 50 partners; including its sole senior partner Mark Leibler AC, and its managing partner Henry Lanzer AM. Its founding partner is Mark Leibler, a prominent member of Australian society.

== History and operations ==
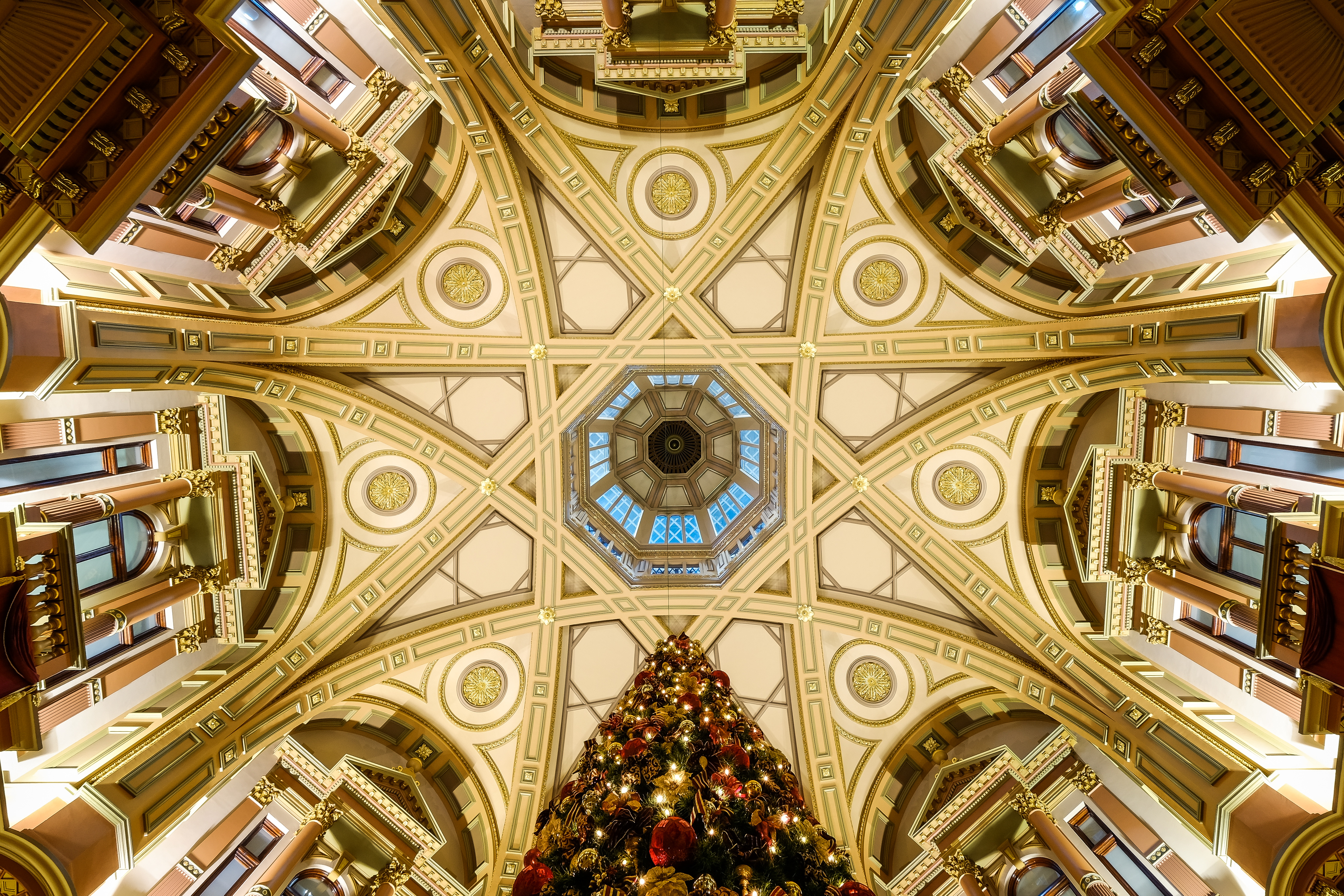
Ceiling of 333 Collins St

The firm was founded in 1953, with the current iteration originating in a 1969 partnership between the lawyers Mark Leibler and Arnold Bloch. Eventually, Bloch decided to leave the partnership and have the name changed; but Leibler insisted that the name of the firm stay the same even after Bloch's departure.

The firm is involved at the boardroom level at many major Australian companies. The firm has especially strong expertise in the areas of tax law and commercial law. Its boardrooms are named for the firm's founder Arnold Bloch, Ron Castan, (Note: Who led the legal team for Eddie Mabo in the Mabo v Queensland decision, where the firm acted as Solicitor) and Sir Zelman Cowen.

The office of the firm has been described as being filled with 'large paintings - the sort of business art that some artists specialise in, big bold paintings that are essentially decorative and speak of success and power'.

The firm is historically associated with Melbourne's Jewish community. Reasons for this include; its leading partner Mark Leibler, its association with prominent legal professionals of the Jewish faith, and its 'early clients being Jewish businessmen finding their feet in their adopted Australia'. The firm has distanced itself from past clients that have behaved in conflict with its historical roots. (such as Redbubble)

The firm additionally has a strong association with law affecting Indigenous Australians, particularly the law of native title. It has practised in the area for 30 years, with a long-standing pro-bono practice. The firm acted as solicitor for the landmark Mabo v Queensland decision which set precedent for Native Title in Australia and was additionally involved in the setting up of Australia's Reconciliation Action Plan program, the Uluru statement from the heart, and its partner Mark Leibler has made public statements in support of the Voice to Parliament.

== Notable lawyers ==
- Mark Leibler
- Jeremy Leibler
- Leon Zwier

== Notable alumni ==
- Noel Pearson
- Paul Bassat
