= Mark Leibler =

Australian lawyer and political activist

Mark Leibler AC is an Australian lawyer and political activist.

Leibler is the sole senior partner of Arnold Bloch Leibler, an Australian law firm founded by Arnold Bloch in 1953, where he became a partner in 1969. Leibler is a political activist, especially on the issues of Indigenous rights and support of Israel.

He is a member of Australia's prominent Leibler family, the younger brother of Isi Leibler and son of Abraham Leibler.

== Early life ==
Mark was born to Abraham Leibler, a Jewish jeweller from Antwerp, and Rachel Leibler. His family became prominent in Australian business circles after his father established a jewellery business in Melbourne that was the first source of his family's wealth.

His older brother Isi established what became Australia's largest travel agency in 1963. (Note: 'Jetset Tours', later sold to Air New Zealand)

Mark became a name partner at Arnold Bloch Leibler in 1969.

== Political activism ==
Leibler is politically active and prominent in Australian political circles. He is associated with various political causes, and particularly with campaigns associated with the rights of Indigenous Australians, as well as being a supporter of Israel. He is a member of Melbourne's Jewish community.

Australia's former prime minister Julia Gillard said of Leibler "you would never die wondering what he thought", that he has always displayed a "care and concern about me as a human being", and that she saw him as "both a product of and a shaper of this community".

Leibler has spoken of his friendships with Bill Hayden, as well as his relationships with former prime ministers Paul Keating, John Howard and Julia Gillard.

In 1998, Leibler as national chairman of AIJAC supported the publishing of a leaked list of over 2,000 One Nation members and donors. Leibler also lobbied for the Coalition parties to put One Nation last on preference during the 1998 Australian federal election.

=== Indigenous rights ===
Leibler was involved in the setting up of Australia's Reconciliation Action Plan program and the development of the Uluru statement from the heart, having co-chaired the Referendum Council that led to the release of the Uluru Statement from the Heart. The Statement proposed an Indigenous voice to parliament which was unsuccessfully put to a referendum in October 2023. His law firm has a strong association with law affecting Indigenous Australians, particularly native title. It has practised in the area for 30 years, with a long-standing pro-bono practice. Leibler also co-chaired Reconciliation Australian and the Expert Panel on Constitutional Recognition of Aboriginal and Torres Strait Islander Australians.

=== Israel politics ===
Leibler's political views have been described as Zionist and, since 1996, has been national chairman of AIJAC. He has publicly encouraged members of the Australian Jewish community to settle in Israel, and has spoken in opposition to descriptions of Israeli settlement land as 'occupied', preferring the term 'disputed'. He has publicly criticised the Australian Labor Party's stance toward Israeli settlements and the diplomatic status of Palestine, notably conflicting in public with Australia's then foreign minister Bob Carr in 2014.

Alongside his chairmanship of AIJAC, Leibler is Life Chairman of the United Israel Appeal of Australia and Governor of the Australia-Israel Chamber of Commerce. He is also a Patron of the Victorian Chapter of the Australian Friends of Tel Aviv University.

Leibler served for 10 years as President of the Zionist Federation of Australia and for six years as President of the United Israel Appeal of Australia. Leibler is a past Chair of the World Board of Trustees of Keren Hayesod – United Israel Appeal, serves on the executive of the Jewish Agency for Israel, and holds office as a Governor of Tel Aviv University.

== Awards and recognition ==
Leibler was appointed an Officer of the Order of Australia (AO) in the 1987 Australia Day Honours. He was promoted to Companion (AC) in the 2005 Australia Day Honours. In 2014 the University of Melbourne awarded him the degree of Doctor of Laws honoris causa.

In November 2024 Leibler, in a joint ceremony together with Sydney billionaire lawyer Frank Lowy, has been given Israel’s highest civilian award, the Israeli Presidential Medal of Honour for his commitment to Israel and the support of the Jewish communities in Australia. They were the first Australians thusly honoured.

== Personal ==
Leibler has four children, the youngest of whom is Jeremy Leibler.
