= Ali Kazak =

Palestinian-Australian politician (1947–2025)

Ali Kazak علي القزق
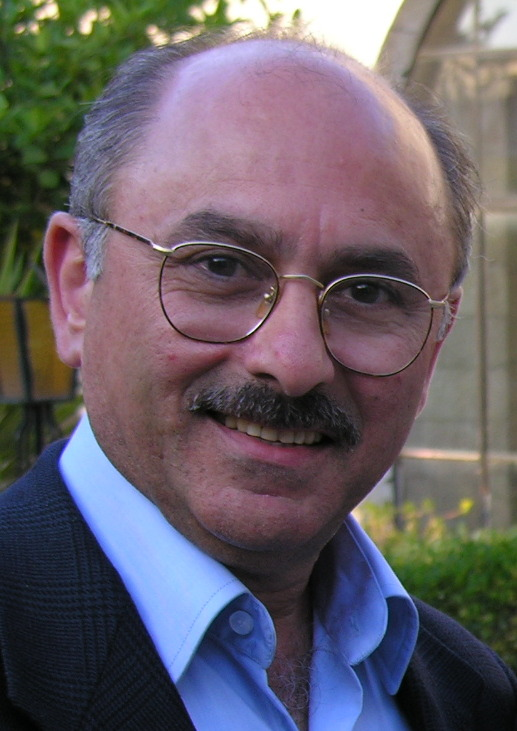
- Kazak in 2005

Personal details
- Born: 29 March 1947 Haifa, Mandatory Palestine
- Died: 17 May 2025 (aged 78) Bangkok, Thailand
- Party: Fatah

Ali Kazak (Arabic: علي القزق; 29 March 1947 – 17 May 2025) was a Palestinian diplomat. He was the managing director of Southern Link International, a business, investment consultancy and public relations company. He was the founder of the Australia-Arab Affairs Council and Palestine Publications, a not-for-profit. He was a member of the Fateh Advisory Council.

== Early life ==
Kazak was born in Haifa in 1947. He grew up in Syria as a Palestinian refugee. He and his mother were separated from his father when Israel was created in 1948 and were prevented from returning home. He did not see his father, who was living back in Haifa, for 48 years. In 1968, while at Damascus University, Kazak was invited to join the Palestine National Liberation Movement (Fateh) and joined its political wing. At the time the movement was underground; it is now the largest party within the PLO.

Kazak immigrated to Australia in 1970. He became active in pro-Palestinian lobbying.

== Early history in Australia ==
Kazak was the founder, publisher and co-editor of the Australian Newspaper Free Palestine (1979–90). He was also the publisher and editor of Background Briefing (1987–93), the book The Jerusalem Question (1997), which was translated into Portuguese and reprinted in Brazil, and the author of the book Australia and the Arabs (أستراليا والعرب, written in Arabic) in 2012, which was published by the Arab Center for Research and Policy Studies, in Doha, Qatar. He also contributed a chapter in 'Israel's International Relations: Contexts, Tools, Success and Failures' published in Arabic by MADAR (The Palestinian Forum for Israeli Studies) entitled 'Israel's Relations with Australia, New Zealand and the pacific region'. As well, he wrote other booklets and publications on the Palestine question, and penned the Palestinian entry in the Encyclopedia of the Australian People put out by the Australian Government to commemorate Australia's bicentennial in 1988. He also organised a number of Palestinian political and cultural exhibitions throughout Australia.

He was the founder and the driving force behind the establishment of the Palestine Human Rights Campaign on 30 May 1981 in a number of states in Australia (VIC, ACT, SA, WA and QLD) and in New Zealand's major cities, and other Palestinian community groups.

His activities in advocating for the Palestinian cause were recognised in 1981 with his appointment by the PLO Executive Committee as the PLO's representative to Australia, New Zealand and the Pacific region.

== Diplomatic mission ==
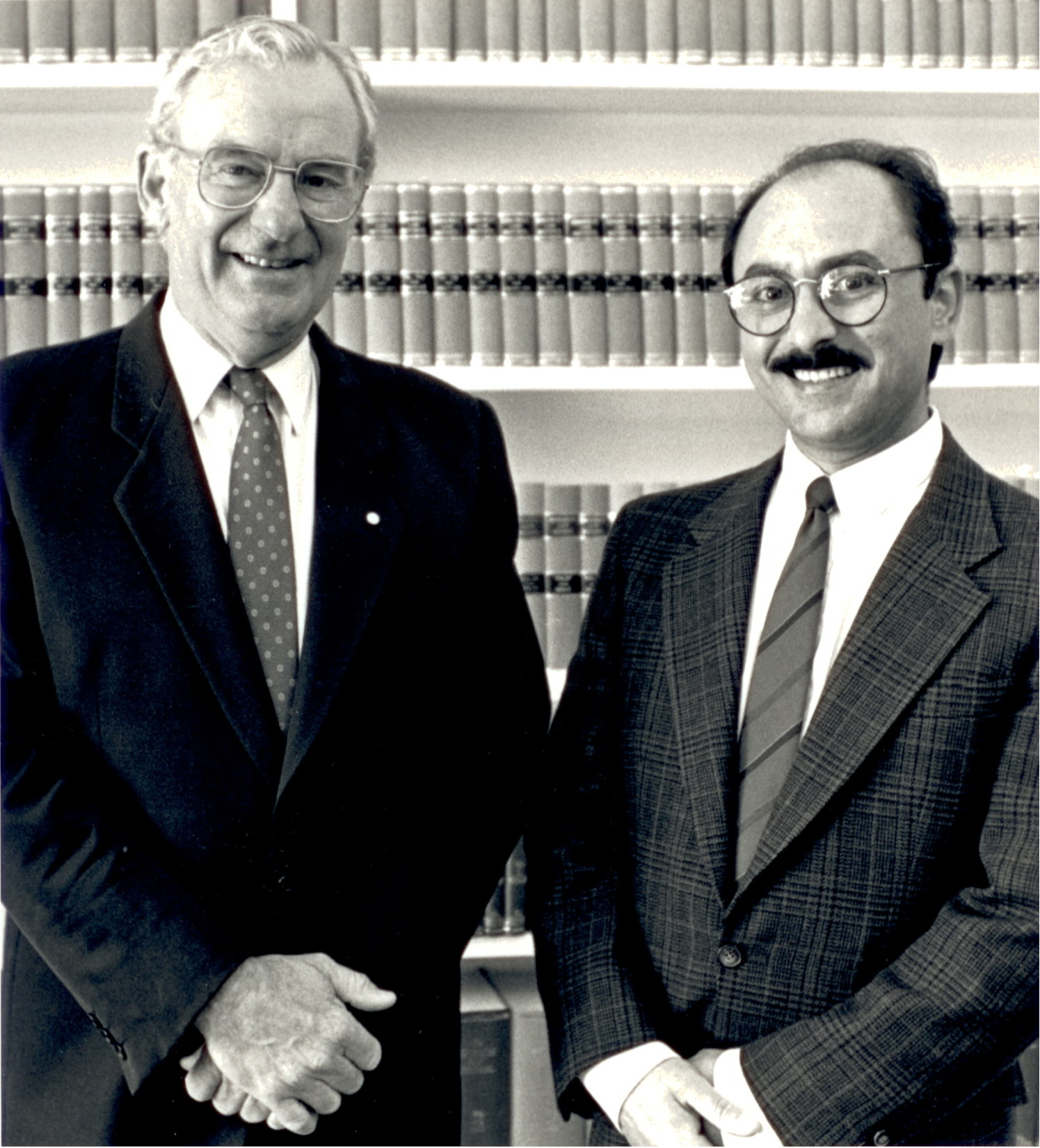
Received by the Governor-General of the Commonwealth of Australia H.E. Bill Hayden on 29 May 1990

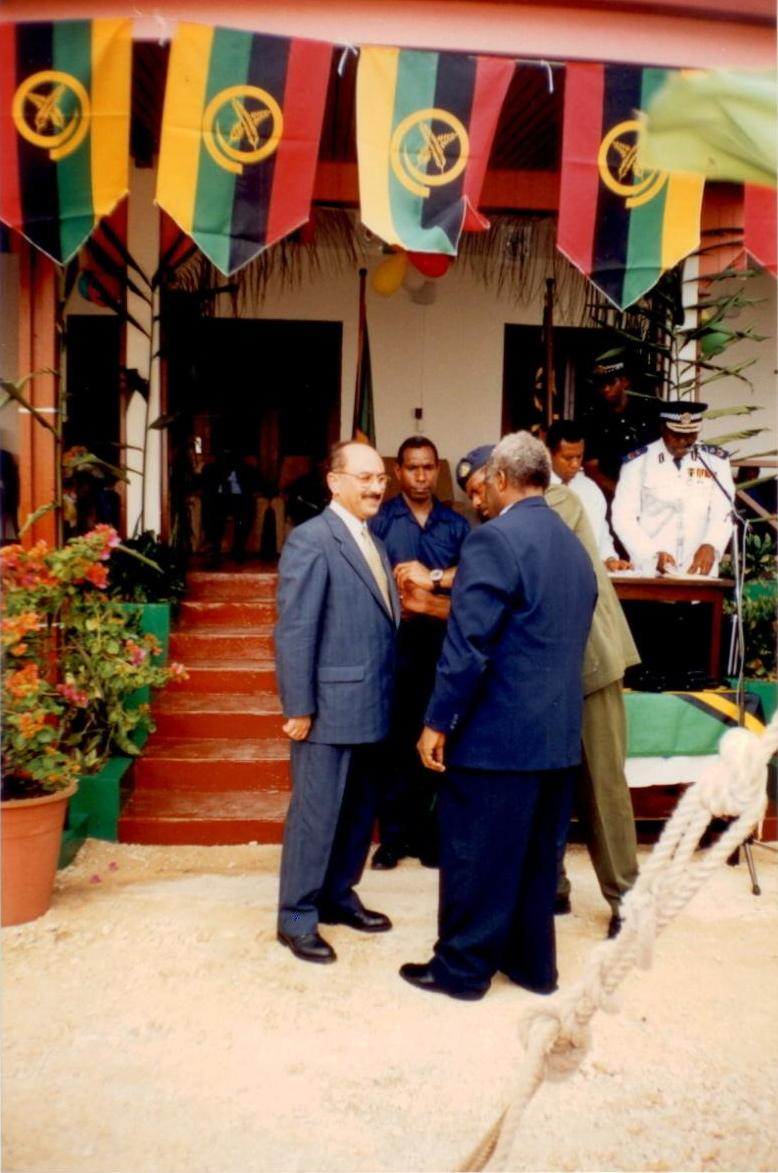
Receiving the 20th Anniversary of Independence Medal from the President of Vanuatu, Rev. John Bani, on 30 July 2000

In 1982, he established the Palestinian diplomatic mission in Australia under the name of the Palestine Information Office, which was recognised by the Australian government in 1989 as the office of the Palestine Liberation Organisation, and then further recognised in 1994 as the General Palestinian Delegation.

During a speaking tour of New Zealand in early 1982, Kazak met with the Foreign Minister Warren Cooper, which was the first official meeting with a PLO official by the NZ Government, and resulted in New Zealand's recognition of the PLO. In 1982, Kazak led a delegation to the Middle East, comprising parliamentarians, clergy, academics and journalists from both Australia and New Zealand. It was the first-ever Arab-led delegation and was followed by other parliamentary delegations.

Kazak was the first Arab official to visit the South Pacific countries in 1985. He was received by consecutive heads of governments, prime ministers and foreign ministers in Australia, New Zealand and the Pacific region.

His efforts were crucial in gaining recognition by the Republic of Vanuatu (1985), Papua New Guinea (1994) and East Timor (2004) of the State of Palestine and the establishment of full diplomatic relations with these countries. Kazak presented his credentials as the non-resident Ambassador of Palestine to the Republic of Vanuatu on 19 October 1989 and to the Democratic Republic of East Timor on 2 March 2004. He was also Ambassador-designate to Papua New Guinea (1994–2006).

Kazak was awarded the 20th Anniversary of Independence Medal by the president of Vanuatu, Rev. John Bani, on 30 July 2000, becoming the first Middle East ambassador to receive such an award throughout the Pacific and Australasian regions.

In May 1986, Kazak became the first person to call for adjudication by the Australian Press Council of untrue and stereotyped reporting of Palestinians by an Australian media outlet. The case was upheld by the Press Council in its adjudication of 27 August 1986. This was followed by other cases in which the Palestinian people were vilified by the media.

Kazak presented three comprehensive submissions to the first, second and third inquiries of the Federal Parliament's Human Rights Sub-Committee in 1992/93, 1993/94 and 1998/99 respectively, as well as a further submission to the Foreign Affairs Sub-Committee's inquiry in 2000 on Australia's relations with the Middle East. He was also invited to appear at the committee's public hearings.

He addressed and represented Palestine at numerous national and international conferences and forums. He was also invited to speak at international forums such as the (United Arab) Emirates Centre for Strategic Studies and Research's symposium 'Australia and the Arab World' in 2009, and wrote articles in the mainstream Australian and international media. Kazak appeared on national and international television and radio programs.

Kazak played a major role in obtaining the release of NZ hostages captured by the Iraqi army in Kuwait in 1990 and taken to Baghdad.

In the late 1990s, Kazak initiated the establishment of the NSW State Parliamentary Friends of Palestine group (1998), the Australian Federal Parliamentary Friends of Palestine (1999), the Victorian Parliamentary Friends of Palestine (2002) and the South Australia Parliamentary Friends of Palestine (2003) and the New Zealand Parliamentary Friends of Palestine (1999).

Following the Declaration of Principles in 1993, Kazak was able to return to Haifa in June 1995. He was reunited with his father for the first time in 48 years.

== Death ==
Kazak died in Thailand while on the way to Palestine, on 17 May 2025, at the age of 78. He had been recovering from heart surgery.
