= Edgar Gold =

German-born lawyer (born 1934)

- Born: 1934 (age 91–92); Hamburg, Germany
- Occupations: Lawyer, author, academic, and master mariner

Edgar Gold, CM, AM, QC (born 1934) is an Australian and Canadian lawyer, author, academic, and master mariner. He is one of the leading experts in the areas of international ocean law and marine and environmental policy development.

He was born in Hamburg, Germany, but later moved to Australia in 1949. Edgar moved again to Halifax, Nova Scotia in 1967. He received a Bachelor of Arts and Bachelor of Laws from Dalhousie University. He received a PhD in international maritime law from the University of Wales. He was called to the Nova Scotia Bar in 1973. He was appointed Queen's Counsel in 1995.

He is married to psychiatrist Dr. Judith Gold, the first woman to head the Canadian Psychiatric Association and the first Canadian to be elected president of its American counterpart.

He spent sixteen years in the merchant marine and holds an unlimited Master Mariner's Certificate and was in command for several years.

He joined the Faculty of Law of Dalhousie University in 1975 and from 1975 to 1994 was a Professor of Law and from 1986 to 1996 was a Professor of Resource and Environmental Studies. He is a founding member of Dalhousie Law School's Marine and Environmental Law Programme. He was a senior partner in a Canadian law firm for many years where he practiced in the areas of maritime law and oil and gas law.

He was an adjunct professor at the T.C. Beirne School of Law, University of Queensland, Brisbane, Australia from 2000 to 2010.

In 1997, he was made a Member of the Order of Canada. In 2005, he was made a Member of the Order of Australia "for service to maritime law and protection of the environment as a policy developer and adviser, and through academic roles and involvement in international maritime organisations".

== Notes ==
1. Order of Canada citation
2. Order of Australia citation
