= Racial Vilification Act 1996 =

Racial Vilification Act 1996 is the short title of the Act to prohibit certain conduct involving vilification of people on the ground of race. It is a part of the legislation in South Australia, assented to 12 December 1996. The act amends the Wrongs Act 1936.

A person must not, by a public act, incite hatred towards, serious contempt for, or severe ridicule of, a person or group of persons on the ground of their race by threatening or inciting other to threaten physical harm to the person, or members of the group, or to property of the person or members of the group.

For the purpose of the law, "race" means the nationality, country of origin, colour or ethnic origin of the person.
