= Colin Neave =

Australian business executive (born 1943)

Colin Robert McKenzie Neave AM (born 1 December 1943) is an Australian business executive. He was the Australian Commonwealth Ombudsman from 2012 to 2017. He is President of the Administrative Review Council and Chairman of the Commonwealth Consumer Affairs Advisory Council. He was appointed a Member of the Order of Australia in June 2005 for service to public administration and to the banking and finance industry, particularly through dispute resolution.

He has served as the Chief Ombudsman of the Financial Ombudsman Service, Chairperson of the Legal Services Board of Victoria, the Australian Banking Industry Ombudsman and Vice Chair of the Australian Press Council. He has held senior management positions in the public sectors of several jurisdictions including as Deputy Secretary of the Commonwealth Attorney-General's Department, managing director of the Legal Aid Commission of NSW, Secretary of the Victorian Attorney-General's Department and Director-General of the South Australian Department of Public and Consumer Affairs.

Government offices
Preceded by Allan Asher	Commonwealth Ombudsman; 2012–2017	Succeeded by Michael Manthorpe
