= Jeremy Jones (activist) =

Australian Jewish leader and activist (1958–2023)

Jeremy Jones AM (1958–2023) was a prominent Australian Jewish leader, interfaith activist, and director of the Australia/Israel & Jewish Affairs Council (AIJAC). He also served as president of the Executive Council of Australian Jewry (ECAJ).

== Overview ==
Jones was born in Melbourne, Australia. He studied history and government at the University of Sydney. After graduating, Jones worked as a researcher for the NSW Jewish Board of Deputies. In the 1980s, he joined the Executive Council of Australian Jewry (ECAJ) as a member of the staff. At the ECAJ, Jones held a number of senior positions, including executive director from 1994 to 2006. During his time at the ECAJ, Jones played a leading role in promoting Jewish communal life and advocating for the interests of the Australian Jewish community. He was also a strong advocate for interfaith dialogue and understanding. In 2002, he represented the ECAJ in a landmark court case against Holocaust denier Fredrick Toben.

In 2006, Jones was appointed director of international and community affairs at AIJAC, where he worked to promote understanding and support for Israel and the Australian Jewish community. He was also a member of the board of directors of the International Holocaust Remembrance Alliance.

Jones was a highly respected figure in the Australian Jewish community and beyond. He was awarded the Australian Human Rights Medal in 2007 and the Stepan Kerkyasharian AO Medal for Community Harmony in 2016. He was appointed a Member of the Order of Australia in 2005.

Jones died on the 6th of September 2023.
