= Australian Takeovers Panel =

Statutory authority overview
- Jurisdiction: Commonwealth of Australia
- Headquarters: Melbourne, Australia
- Minister responsible: Jim Chalmers MP, Treasurer of Australia
- Statutory authority executives: Alex Cartel, President; Allan Bulman, Director
- Key documents: Australian Securities and Investments Commission Act (Cth); Corporations Act 2001 (Cth)
- Website: takeovers.gov.au

The Australian Takeovers Panel, a statutory authority of the Australian Government, is the primary Australian forum for resolving disputes about a takeover bid during the bid period itself. The panel is a peer review body, made up of part-time members from the Australian investment banking, legal, accounting and business communities. Its head office is located in Melbourne, Victoria.

== Establishment and powers ==
The panel was established under section 171 of the Australian Securities and Investments Commission Act 2001 and is given various powers under Part 6.10 of the Corporations Act 2001. The panel has a full-time executive base who assist its members, draft policy, and provide continuity to the panel in its decisions.

The Takeovers Panel has three main powers:

1. to declare circumstances in relation to a takeover, or to the control of an Australian company, to be "unacceptable circumstances";
2. to protect the rights of persons (especially target company shareholders) during a takeover bid and to ensure that a takeover bid proceeds (as far as possible) in a way that it would have proceeded if the unacceptable circumstances had not occurred; and
3. various review powers.

The panel has similar peers in other jurisdictions, such as the London Panel on Takeovers and Mergers in the UK.
