= Australian Jews =

Ethnic and religious group in Australia

Australian Jews יהדות אוסטרליה
Total population
- 91,022–250,000 (0.4%–1% of the Australian population)

Regions with significant populations
- Melbourne, Sydney and other metropolitan areas

Languages
- Australian English (predominant); Hebrew, Yiddish, Russian, Hungarian, Romanian, French, Persian, Arabic, Afrikaans, Bukhori, Polish, German, Chinese.

Religion
- Judaism · Jewish secularism

Related ethnic groups
- Anglo-Israelis and Israeli Australians

Australian Jews, or Jewish Australians, (Hebrew: יהודים אוסטרלים, romanized: yehudim ostralim) are Jews who are Australian citizens or permanent residents of Australia. In the 2021 census there were 99,956 people who identified Judaism as their religious affiliation and 29,113 Australians who identified as Jewish by ancestry, an increase from 97,355 and 25,716, respectively, from the 2016 census. The actual number is almost certainly higher, due to differing perceptions of Jewish identity, however Australian census data is based on religious affiliation, so secular Jews may perceive it would be inaccurate to answer with "Judaism". Also, since the question is optional, many religiously observant Holocaust survivors and Haredi Jews are believed to prefer not to disclose their religion in the census. By comparison, the Israeli newspaper Haaretz estimated a Jewish-Australian population of 120,000–150,000 (not limited to adherents of Judaism), while other estimates based on the death rate in the community place the size of the community at 250,000, which would make the Jewish population about 1% of the total population. Based on the census data, Jewish citizens make up about 0.4% of the Australian population.

The Jewish community in Australia is composed predominantly of Ashkenazi Jews who emigrated from diaspora communities in Central and Eastern Europe, and their Australia-born descendants. There is, however, a minority from all Jewish ethnic divisions, as well as a number of converts. The Jewish community in Australia comprises a wide range of Jewish cultural traditions, encompassing the full spectrum of religious observance, from Haredi communities to Jews who are entirely secular and atheist.

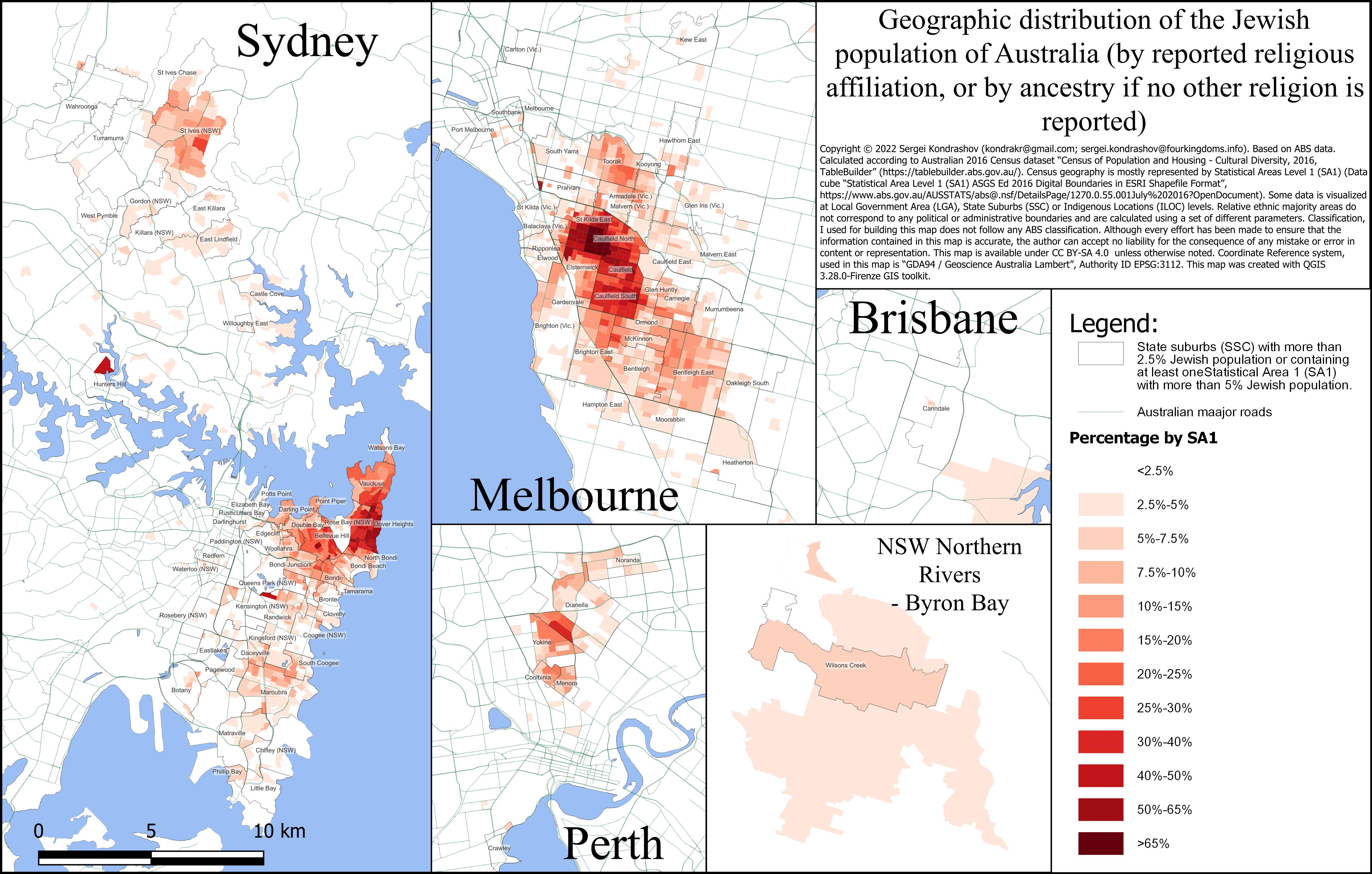
Geographic distribution of the Jewish population of Australia (by reported religious affiliation, or by ancestry if no other religion is reported), by Statistical Areas 1 (SA1)

== History ==
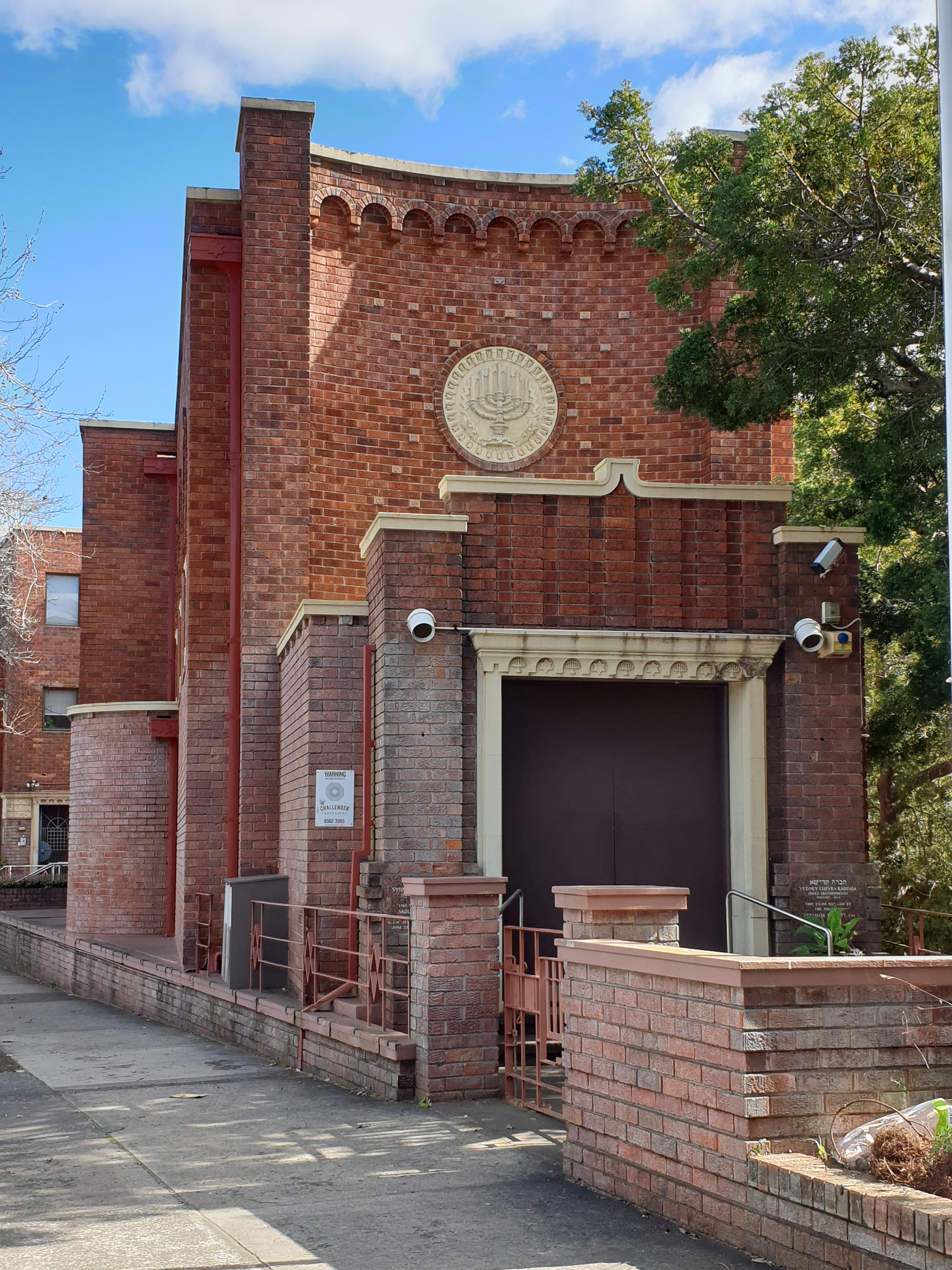
The chapel of the Sydney Chevra Kadisha, Woollahra, New South Wales

The history of the Jews in Australia is contained in comprehensive major general histories by the academic historians Hilary L. Rubinstein, William Rubinstein, and Suzanne Rutland, as well as in specialised works by such scholars as Rabbi John Levi and Yossi Aron covering specific topics and time periods. The twice-a-year (June and November) journals of the Australian Jewish Historical Society (the June issues are edited in Sydney by Professor Rutland, and the November issues in Melbourne by Dr Hilary Rubinstein) include many original articles by both professional and amateur historians.

The first Jews to come to Australia were at least eight convicts from England transported to Botany Bay in 1788 aboard the First Fleet. About 15,100 convicts had been transported by the time transportation ceased in 1840 in New South Wales and 1853 in Tasmania. It is estimated that of those who arrived by 1845, about 800 were Jewish. Most of them came from London, were of working-class background, and were male. Only 7% of Jewish convicts were female, compared with 15% for non-Jewish convicts. The average age of the Jewish convicts was 25 but ranged from as young as 8 to the elderly.

At first, the Church of England was the established religion, and during the early years of transportation all convicts were required to attend Anglican services on Sundays. This included Irish Catholics as well as the Jews. Similarly, education in the new settlement was Anglican church controlled until the 1840s.

The first move toward organisation in the community was the formation of a Chevra Kadisha (a Jewish burial society) in Sydney in 1817, but the allocation of land for a Jewish cemetery was not approved until 1832. In 1830, the first Jewish wedding in Australia was celebrated, the contracting parties being Moses Joseph and Rosetta Nathan.

Jewish immigration in the interwar period came at a time of antisemitism and the White Australia policy. The Returned Services League and other groups publicised cartoons to encourage the government and the immigration Minister Arthur A. Calwell to stem the flow of Jewish immigrants.

Sephardi Jews first immigrated to Australia in the mid-to-late 19th century. The community thrived for some twenty years. During this period, there was a Sephardic congregation, and some Sephardi families occupied important communal positions. Gradually, however, the Sephardi population declined, and the congregation was disbanded in 1873. A new Sephardic community also emerged in the post-war period. Previously, Mizrahi Jews were generally not permitted to enter due to Australia's White Australia policy. However, following the Suez Crisis in 1956, a number of Egyptian Jews were allowed to enter. Over the following years, overtures from Jewish communities led the government to drop its previous stance on entry of Mizrahi Jews. By 1969, when Iraqi Jews were being persecuted, the government granted refugee status to Iraqi Jews who managed to reach Australia.

In Australia, in the wake of the outbreak of World War II, Jews escaping the Nazis who had German passports, such as two-year-old Eva Duldig, who years later was a top tennis player for Australia, and her parents sculptor Karl Duldig and artist and inventor Slawa Duldig, were classified as enemy aliens upon their arrival due to their having arrived with German identity papers. Beginning the year prior to their arrival in Australia, a new Australian law had designated people "enemy aliens" if they were Germans, or were Australians who had been born in Germany. The Australian government therefore interned the three of them for two years in isolated Tatura Internment Camp 3 D, 180 kilometers north of Melbourne. They were held with nearly 300 other internees. The internment camp was located near Shepparton, in the northern part of the state of Victoria. There, armed soldiers manned watchtowers and scanned the camp that was bordered by a barbed wire fence with searchlights, and other armed soldiers patrolled the camp. Petitions to Australian politicians, stressing that they were Jewish refugees and therefore being unjustly imprisoned, had no effect. They remained in the internment camp until 1942, when her father enlisted in the Australian Army.

== Culture ==
=== Jewish streams and movements ===
There are three main streams of Judaism active in Australia: Orthodox (Modern and Haredi), Conservative and Reform. Statistics are only available for the Melbourne community, but they are considered representative of other Jewish communities around the country. In Melbourne, 6% of Jews identify themselves as 'strictly orthodox,' 33% as 'traditionally religious' and 15% as 'Liberal or Reform.' 43% consider themselves as 'Jewish but not religious,' whilst 1% as 'opposed to religion' altogether. Many of the Jews who consider themselves 'Jewish but not religious' still send their children to orthodox Jewish day schools or are members of Orthodox synagogues.

According to Suzanne Rutland, 'most Australian Jews can be best described as non-practising orthodox.' This Anglo-Jewish community developed its own form of 'modern Orthodoxy' which remains predominant until today.

Hitler's ascent to power and the horrors of World War II and the Holocaust also brought large numbers of refugees from central Europe. From the mid-1930s, Temple Beth Israel in Melbourne became the basis of a Reform community because of its newly arrived German members. The Temple's German-born rabbi played an integral role in promoting the movement and, in 1938, when visiting Sydney, he established Temple Emanuel. It also attracted many Jews from Germany and other parts of Central Europe, who arrived in Sydney prior to the outbreak of the war.

In the 1940s and 1950s, due to the conditions leading up to and resulting from the Holocaust, the HMT Dunera being diverted from the United Kingdom to Australia, and the stifling of the Hungarian Revolution of 1956 saw the emergence of ultra-Orthodox Haredi and Hasidic communities in Sydney and Melbourne. Although a small Hasidic community existed in Shepparton since the 1910s supported with additional families by Rabbi Yosef Yitzchak Schneersohn. The first Sephardic synagogue in Australia was founded in 1962.

There had been at least two short-lived efforts to establish Reform congregations, the first as early as the 1890s. However, in 1930, under the leadership of Ada Phillips, a Liberal or Progressive congregation, Temple Beth Israel, was permanently established in Melbourne. In 1938 the long-serving senior rabbi, Rabbi Dr Herman Sanger, was instrumental in establishing another synagogue, Temple Emanuel in Sydney. He also played a part in founding a number of other Liberal synagogues in other cities in both Australia and New Zealand. The first Australian-born rabbi, Rabbi Dr John Levi, served the Australian Liberal movement.

In 2012, the first Humanistic Jewish congregation, known as Kehilat Kolenu, was established in Melbourne, with links to the cultural Jewish youth movement Habonim Dror. Later in 2012, a similar congregation was established in Sydney, known as Ayelet HaShachar. The services are loosely based on the Humanistic Jewish movement in the United States and the musical-prayer group Nava Tehila in Israel.

=== Education ===
==== Schools ====
The Melbourne Hebrew School was a Jewish day school established in 1855 under the auspices of the Melbourne Hebrew Congregation, providing general and also Hebrew studies until 1895.

In 1942, the first Jewish day school and kindergarten was formed in North Bondi, Sydney. The first communal Jewish day school, Mount Scopus College, was founded in Melbourne in 1949. In its first year, the school had 120 students, and reached a peak of 2,800 students in the 1980s. Today it is still one of the largest Jewish day schools in the Jewish diaspora. The largest Jewish school in Australia today is Moriah College, Sydney.

The Jewish day school system provides an excellent academic, religious, Zionist, sporting and social experience. In recent decades, the ultra-orthodox and Reform movements have established their own schools and community schools have also formed. All in all, there are 19 Jewish day schools in Australia. It is estimated that in Melbourne between 70% and 75% of all Jewish students attend a Jewish school at some stage of their schooling. In Sydney, this figure is 62%. In 1996, over 10,000 Jewish students attended a Jewish school in Australia.

Jewish day schools in Australia are much more expensive than the government/state schools. Therefore, a number of state schools, especially in Sydney, have a large number of Jewish students. The Boards of Jewish Education attend to the Jewish educational needs of such students. As a result, several state schools offer Hebrew or Jewish Studies as elective courses. Further, a number of education boards also attend to Jewish students in the smaller centres of Adelaide, Brisbane and Canberra.

==== Higher education ====
In addition to Jewish education at a school level, Australian Jewry have opportunities for Jewish higher education. The University of Sydney and Monash University in Melbourne both have full Jewish Studies departments, allowing students to study Jewish Civilization, Hebrew (Modern and Classical), Holocaust Studies, Yiddish and Zionism. Adult Jewish learning is also very popular in Australia, with the Melton Adult Education Program offering a variety of popular programs linked to the Hebrew University of Jerusalem. The Rabbinical College of Australia and New Zealand offers post-High School education in Jewish studies.

Multiculturalism as an ideology developed in Australia during the 1970s. During this period, Jewish cultural life expanded and was in some cases assisted by the government. There are numerous cultural and social organisations, Jewish radio shows and newspapers, and Jewish museums in both Melbourne and Sydney.

==== Institutions of higher religious study ====
Australia's first Yeshivah the Rabbinical College of Australia and New Zealand was established in 1966 by Reb Zalman Serebryanski. In addition, the Chabad community founded Kollel Menachem, a community kollel founded in 1979.

Kollel Beth HaTalmud Yehudah Fishman Institute was founded in 1981, and was the first overseas community Kollel established by the Lakewood Yeshiva under the direction of Rabbi Shneur Kotler and Rabbi Nosson Wachtfogel. The Kollel consists of a core group of scholars who are engaged in full-time study.

Adass Israel, a Hassidic community in Melbourne launched their own kollel, Kollel Beis Yosef in 1990 With the arrival of Rabbi Kohn as new rabbi of Adass, there has been the establishment of the 'Kolel Horaah' a training centre for in depth Jewish law offering courses to scholars and aspiring rabbis alike. Adass Israel has also established a junior religious seminary (yeshivah ketanah), to prepare students for overseas yeshivot by in depth study of Talmud and Jewish law.

In 1983 Yeshivah College opened a special junior Hasidic talmudic seminary stream called Mesivtah Melbourne for high school students, where students from across Melbourne and Sydney study. The focus for this institution is religious studies without secular studies.

In 1998 Mizrachi opened a kollel in conjunction with Torah MiTziyon in Israel. Rabbis and yeshiva students are sent to Australia to help maintain the running of the kollel.

== Institutions ==
Australian Jewry has a number of important social and cultural institutions. These include B'nai B'rith, the National Council of Jewish Women (NCJW) and Kadimah in Melbourne which sponsors Yiddish culture. In addition, the Hakoah Club in Sydney, which began as a sporting club, is today Sydney Jewry's main social and cultural meeting point, due to its central location in Bondi and excellent, modern premises. Several thousand Hassidic and Haredi Jews predominantly in Melbourne speak Yiddish as an everyday language.

Jewish cultural life as a whole has benefited from the growth of multiculturalism in Australia, particularly during the 1970s. Under the Labor government of Gough Whitlam, the Minister for Immigration, Al Grassby, recommended the establishment of ethnic broadcasting stations. The scheme was finally implemented in 1975, and since then the Jewish community has been served by Radio 2EA in Sydney and Radio 3EA in Melbourne, which in total broadcast in more than 50 community languages. The Jewish community languages are Hebrew, Yiddish and English.

In the 1980s and 1990s, Holocaust museums in both Melbourne and Sydney were established as part of increasing awareness of the Shoah (Holocaust). The Jewish Museum of Australia in Melbourne was opened by Rabbi Ronald Lubofski in 1982, and now has approximately 20,000 objects. Then in 1992, the opening of the Sydney Jewish Museum, dedicated to the Holocaust and Australian Jewish history and located in the historic Maccabean Hall, was heralded as "a landmark event".

Australian Jewish Media comprises radio, television, newspapers and newsletters, online magazines, blogs, and zines. The "Australia-Israel Review" has continued to be an important publication since its establishment in the 1970s. The longest-running Jewish community newspaper is The Australian Jewish News, which celebrated its centenary in November 1995.

== Jewish organisations ==
=== Zionist Australian Jewish organisations, and Australian Jewish organisations supportive of Israel ===
There are several Australian Zionist organisations which focus on fundraising, Zionist education including a range of Israel experience programs, youth movements, promotion of aliyah and a range of cultural institutions. Israel has recognised this by continuing to provide strong funding and other support for the Zionist Federation of Australia, which also enjoys representation at the senior level of the Jewish Agency.

=== Anti-Zionist and Non-Zionist Australian Jewish organisations ===
Since the mid-1980s some Australian Jewish organisations have been increasingly critical of Israel’s occupation of the West Bank and additionally the blockade of Gaza from 2007. The Australian Jewish Democratic Society, formed in 1984 has a long history of criticism of Israeli occupation and Jewish Women in Support of an Independent Palestine participated in the weekly “Women in Black” protests at Sydney Town Hall from 1991.

In response to increasing civilian death in Gaza resulting from military attacks and a blockade on aid to Gaza by Israel, many new and existing Jewish organisations have called for a comprehensive ceasefire, food and aid to be allowed into Gaza, comprehensive sanctions against Israel and opposed the conflation of criticism of Israel with antisemitism. Amongst these organisations is the Jewish Council of Australia, whose name references that of earlier organisations and was founded in 2024 to represent non-Zionist Jews and support Palestinian freedom while opposing antisemitism. The Council has issued public calls for Australia to cut military ties and impose sanctions on Israel, backed pro-Palestinian protests and student rights, and been part of inter-Jewish efforts demanding accountability for Gaza assaults.

=== Rabbinical courts ===
Melbourne is currently being serviced by a number of courts.

The first Beth Din in Australia was set up under the guidance of the Chief Rabbi of the Commonwealth in 1864. This was the first Beth Din in the British Empire outside of London. Following revelations in the late 1990s of abuse by Sholom Gutnick, the senior rabbi of the Beth Din, a restructure of the Melbourne Beth Din was undertaken in 2002 under the joint control of the Rabbinical Council of Victoria (RCV) and the Council of Orthodox Synagogues of Victoria (COSV). In addition the Adass community maintain their own Beth Din. There are also a number of ad hoc Beth Dins that are set up, usually for financial decision, or for conversions.

The Sydney Beth Din was set up in 1905. It serves the Jewish communities in Australia, New Zealand and Asia. The Sydney Beth Din has become the main Beth Din for anyone outside of Victoria following the Melbourne Beth Din's restructure. The Sydney Beth Din has had problems recently when its members were ruled to have had contempt of court in a number of its decisions.

== Demographics ==
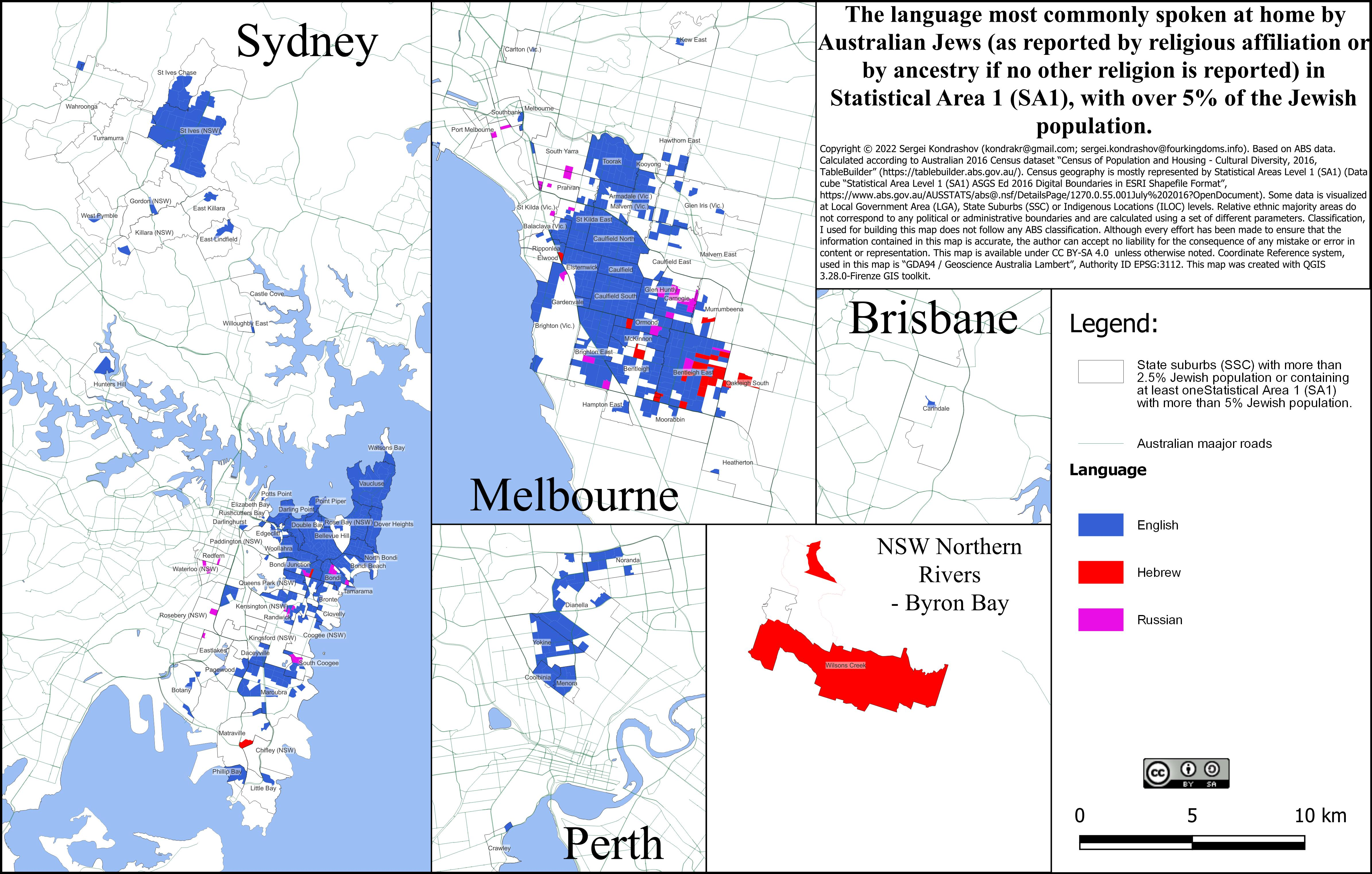
The language most commonly spoken at home by Australian Jews (as reported by religious affiliation or by ancestry if no other religion is reported), by Statistical Areas 1 (SA1) with over 5% of the Jewish population.

People affiliated with Judaism as a percentage of the total population in Sydney at the 2011 census, divided geographically by postal area

Based on the 2021 census, the total Jewish population is estimated to be 117,000.

About 90 percent of the Australian Jewish community live in Sydney and Melbourne.

The Jewish Community Council of Victoria has estimated that 60,000 Australian Jews live in Victoria. In Frankston, the Jewish community nearly doubled between 2007 and 2012.

In Adelaide Australian Jews have been present throughout the history of the city, with many successful civic leaders and people in the arts.

According to the 2016 census, the Jewish population numbered 91,020 individuals, of whom 46% lived in Greater Melbourne, 39% in Greater Sydney, and 6% in Greater Perth. The states and territories with the highest proportion of Jews are Victoria (0.71%) and New South Wales (0.49%), whereas those with the lowest are the Northern Territory and Tasmania (both 0.05%).

The same social and cultural characteristics of Australia that facilitated the extraordinary economic, political, and social success of the Australian Jewish community have also been attributed to contributing to widespread assimilation.

Community success can also be measured by the vibrancy of Australian Jewish Media. While traditional Jewish print media is in decline, new media forms such as podcasts, online magazines, and blogs have stepped into the breach.

In 2018, 5 of the 7 wealthiest people in Australia were Jewish.

=== Significant Jewish population centres ===
==== Melbourne ====
Melbourne's population is highly concentrated around the suburbs of Caulfield North and St Kilda East, although there are significant populations in the suburbs surrounding these suburbs.

There are a large number of schools servicing the community.

- Mount Scopus Memorial College – modern Orthodox, Jewish school
- Bialik College – secular Jewish school
- Leibler Yavneh College – religious Jewish school. Founded in 1962 as a breakaway from Mount Scopus
- Sholem Aleichem College – school founded by the Bundist community in Melbourne
- King David School – Progressive Jewish school
- Yeshiva-Beth Rivka College – boys and girls schools servicing the Chabad community
- Adass Israel School – school servicing the ultra-Orthodox community
- Yesodei HaTorah College – a non-Hassidic ultra-Orthodox school
- Cheder Levi Yitzchak – a Chabad boys school with a more limited secular education.
- Bnos Chana – a twin girls only school of Cheder Levi Yitzchak
- Divrei Emineh – a breakaway from Adass Israel serving the Satmar sect and some other Hasidic Jews
- Tiferes Bnos Yiroel – a girl's Haredi school

There are numerous active congregations in the Jewish community, many concentrated in Caulfield and the St Kilda suburbs, although other areas such as Bentleigh house a significant number of communities.

The Jewish Museum of Australia displays Judaica, ritual objects, Holocaust material, and paintings and sculptures by Jewish authors. The nearby Kadimah Cultural Centre shows Jewish and Yiddish drama, and has a large library of Judaica. There are also kosher restaurants and grocery stores throughout the St Kilda area.

The Australian Jewish News is based in Melbourne, but distributed Australia wide. The Jewish report is published monthly in Melbourne and Sydney, and the Hamodia Australian edition services the Haredi community. There are also numerous pamphlets that are produced for distribution in synagogues around Australia. International Haredi magazines such as Mishpacha and Ami are printed in Melbourne weekly.

Notable Writers academics, and journalists, such as Arnold Zable, Elliot Perlman, Mark Baker, John Safran; broadcasters, such as Raphael Epstein, Jon Faine, Ramona Koval, and Libby Gorr have been prominent in old media and are now joined by a younger generation increasingly making its voice heard through new media, such as comedian YouTubers Michael Shafar and Justine Sless.

==== Sydney ====
A poster of Menachem Mendel Schneerson at the entrance of a Chabad house in Bondi Beach in Sydney's Eastern Suburbs.

In Sydney Jewish diaspora community is estimated as 50,000 Jews in New South Wales out of an Australian Jewish population of 120,000.

Jews can be found throughout the Greater Sydney area, although approximately two-thirds reside in the eastern suburbs, from Vaucluse, through Randwick, Bondi and Double Bay, to Darlinghurst-East Sydney, where many of the service organisations are located. Most of the remainder live on the Upper North Shore, predominantly in the suburbs situated between Chatswood and St Ives. Smaller but active pockets reside in such areas as Maroubra, Coogee, Leichhardt, Newtown and Marrickville. Strathfield, in the Inner West, was historically a centre for the Jewish community in Sydney, but the Jewish population of the area dwindled in recent decades and the synagogue closed in 2013.

One of the strengths of the Sydney community is the significant contribution by overseas immigrants, to the extent that over two-thirds of the Sydney Jewish population originates from South Africa, Hungary, the former Soviet Union and Israel.

==== Perth ====
Carmel School is a Jewish day school in Perth. Jewish Perth is a growing community with numbers over 7,000 and there are a number of different religious congregations catering to the diverse interests, beliefs and traditions of this active community.

The oldest congregation, established over 110 years ago, is the Perth Hebrew Congregation, led by Rabbi Daniel Lieberman. The Perth Hebrew Congregation, also referred to simply as the Perth Synagogue, has more membership than all the other synagogues combined in Perth and thus caters for the vast majority of the Jewish population. They have erected an eruv making travel to and from the shul easier for the large number of orthodox families.

==== Adelaide ====
In Adelaide, there have been many Jews involved in the history of the city, with many successful civic leaders and people in the arts. Jacob Barrow Montefiore was a member of the South Australian Colonization Commission in London from 1835 to 1839, a body appointed by the British government to oversee the establishment the Colony of South Australia, and Montefiore Hill in North Adelaide was named after him His brother, Joseph Barrow Montefiore was a businessman in Adelaide; both brothers also had interests in New South Wales, and other family members were also prominent in the new colonies.

Since February 2017, Professor Ghil'ad Zuckermann from the University of Adelaide has been the President of the Australian Association for Jewish Studies. In November 2020, the Adelaide Holocaust Museum and Andrew Steiner Education Centre (AHMSEC) was established.

=== Assimilation and demographic changes ===
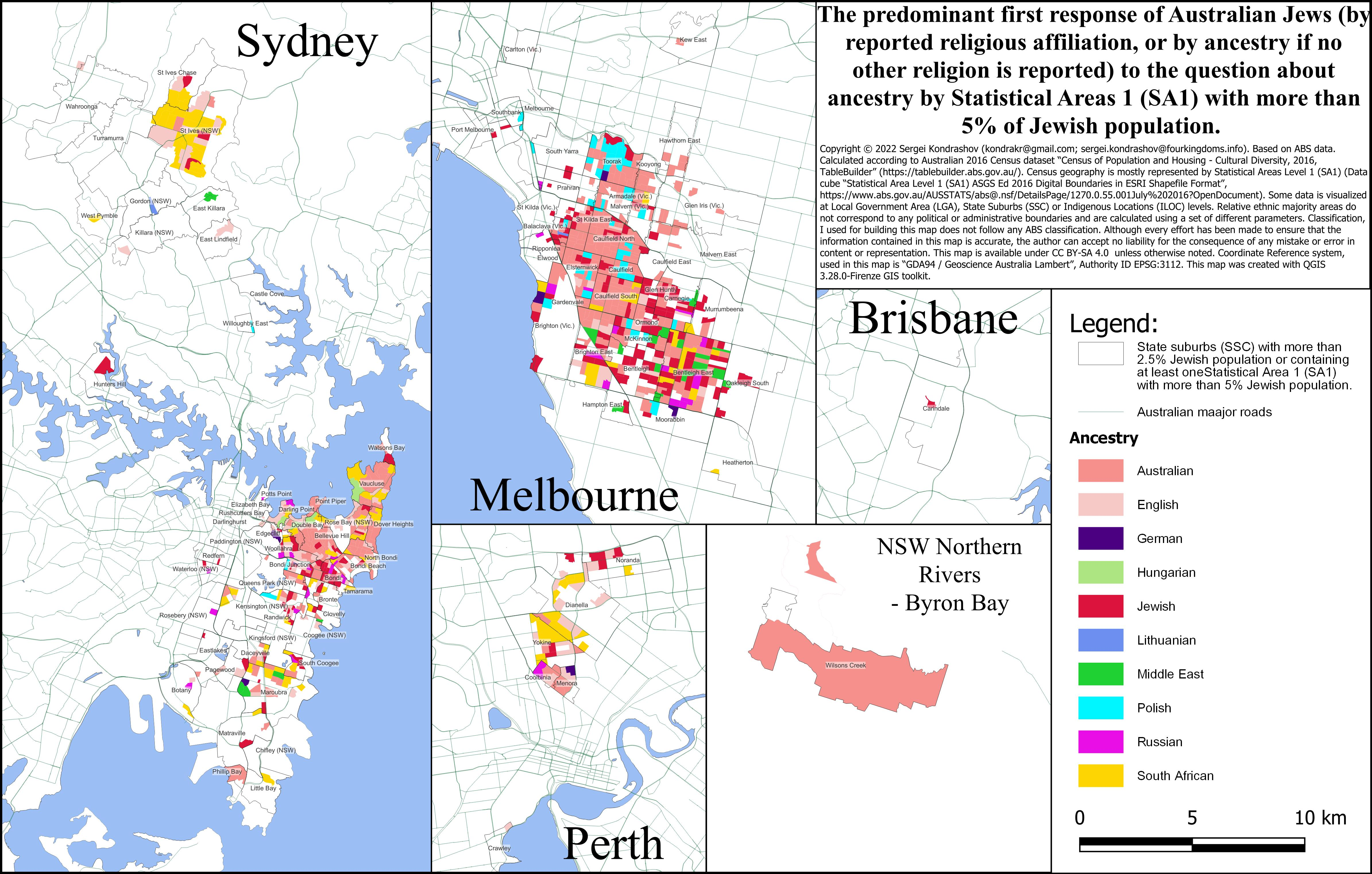
The predominant first response of Australian Jews (by reported religious affiliation, or by ancestry if no other religion is reported) to the question about ancestry, by Statistical Areas 1 (SA1) with more than 5% of Jewish population.

The same social and cultural characteristics of Australia that facilitated the extraordinary economic, political, and social success of the Australian Jewish community have also been attributed to contributing to widespread assimilation. From 2008 to 2012, more than 400 Australian Jews moved to Israel and most of them have done compulsory military service. There was an almost 50 percent increase in immigration from Australia to Israel between 2009 and 2010. There was a 45 percent increase in percentage of immigration in 2010, the highest of the English speaking countries; 240 Australians moved to Israel, up from 165 in 2009.

Prior to 1933, the intermarriage rate in the Australian Jewish community was approximately 30%. This high percentage potentially threatened the future of the community. However, the arrival of Jewish refugees prior to and following World War II, changed the pattern of assimilation.

Demographic research indicates that the intermarriage rate dropped immediately after the war and that by 1971, almost 90% of Jewish men and over 90% of Jewish women were married to Jewish partners.

The 1996 census showed that the intermarriage rate for all Australian Jewry was 15%. Once again, the smaller Jewish communities appear to have a higher rate of intermarriage, with Melbourne's rate far lower than that of Sydney. Similar research, conducted in 1999 by Sydney's Jewish Communal Appeal, concluded that one third of that generation have a non-Jewish partner.

Along with intermarriage comes the physical relocation of many Jews, who prefer to leave the densely populated Jewish areas and the reservoir of potential Jewish life partners. In the rural areas of New South Wales for example, where only 5% of the State's Jewry reside, intermarriage rises to 84%. Even in the larger towns, assimilation and intermarriage vary from area to area.

Of the two most recent waves of immigration to Australia between 1986 and 1991, Jews from the Former Soviet Union seem to have a considerably high intermarriage rate, in contrast to the South African Jewish immigrants, for whom intermarriage is almost entirely unknown.

=== Distribution of Jewish Australians ===
According to profile.id.com.au, the 10 local government areas as of 2011 with the largest Jewish communities, based by percentage of total population, were:

	LGA	Jewish population	% of total
1	City of Glen Eira, Melbourne	24,774	18.9%
2	Waverley Municipal Council, Sydney	10,876	17.1%
3	Municipality of Woollahra, Sydney	7,381	14.2%
4	City of Stonnington, Melbourne	4,571	4.9%
5	City of Port Phillip, Melbourne	3,891	4.3%
6	City of Randwick, Sydney	5,375	4.2%
7	Ku-ring-gai Council, Sydney	3,847	3.5%
8	City of Bayside, Melbourne	2,949	3.2%
9	Municipality of Hunter's Hill, Sydney	1,334	2.5%
10	City of Botany Bay, Sydney	607	1.5%

Jewish communities are concentrated in four electorates. In NSW Division of Wentworth (16.2% of the electorate), in Vic Division of Macnamara 12.8%; in Vic Division of Goldstein 8.8% and in Division of Kingsford Smith 6.0%.

=== Languages ===
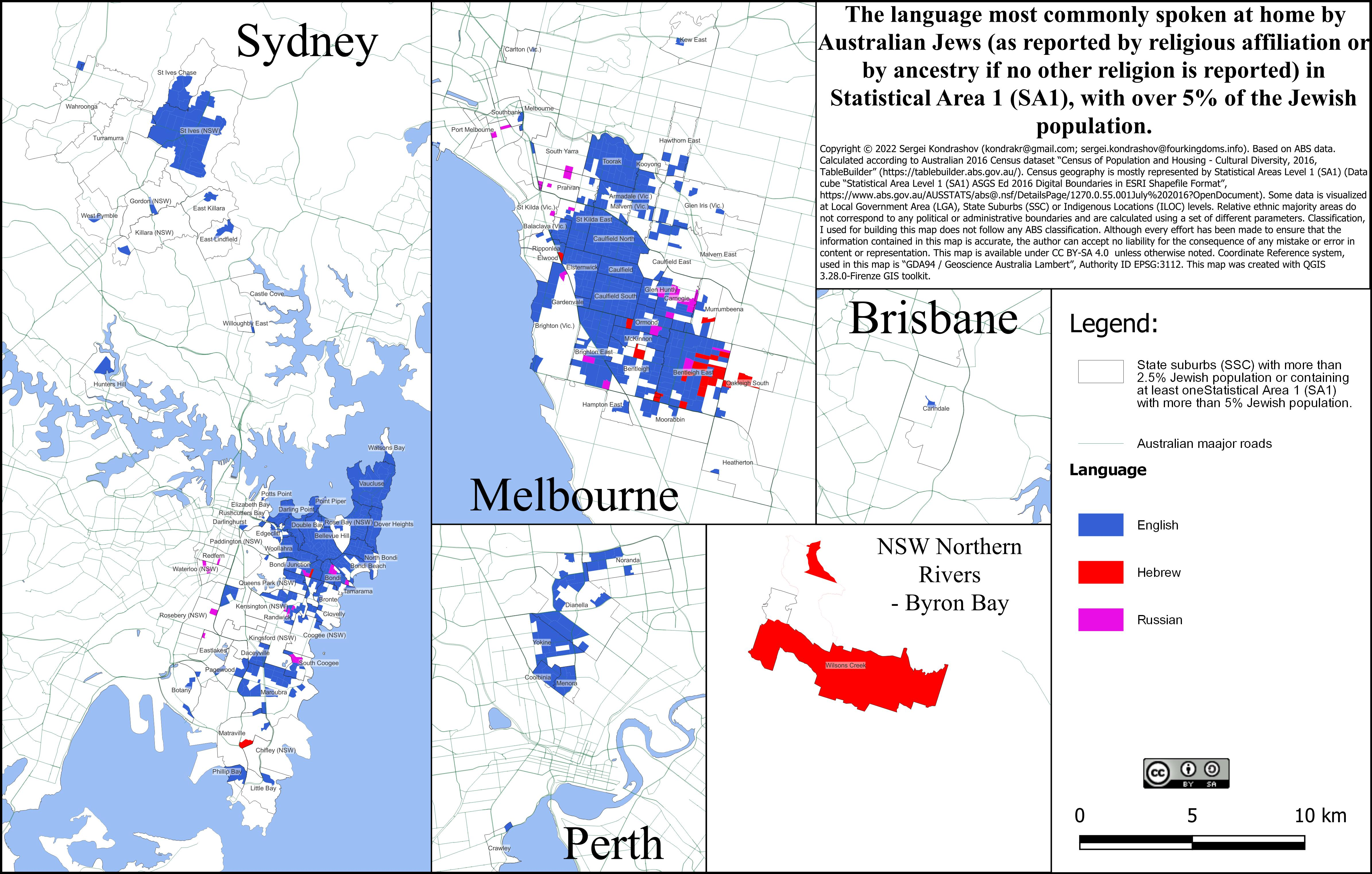
The language most commonly spoken at home by Australian Jews (as reported by religious affiliation or by ancestry if no other religion is reported), by Statistical Areas 1 (SA1) with over 5% of the Jewish population.

The vast majority of Jews speak English; indeed, three-quarters (75.1%) speak no other language, and of the remainder, 16.9% speak English 'Very well' and 5.0% speak it 'Well'. Nevertheless, many Jews do not speak English at home (26,242 people), and, of these, the most common non-English language spoken in Jewish homes was Russian, spoken by an estimated 9,964 people. An estimated 9,543 Jewish people spoke Hebrew at home.

The 2021 Australian census showed 11,504 people speaking Hebrew at home, an increase of 52% since 2006. This increase was largely attributed to immigration of Israeli-born Jews to Australia.

Yet non-English languages are becoming rarer overall; excluding Hebrew, the number of non-English speakers decreased by 8.3% since 2006, most likely due to the passing of older Holocaust survivors and other Jewish refugees from Nazi-occupied Europe.

Language spoken at home, estimated number of Jewish people:

	Languages	Number of speakers	% of Jewish population
1	English	83,453	76.1%
2	Russian	9,964	9.1%
3	Hebrew	9,954	8.7%
4	Yiddish	1,901	1.7%
5	Hungarian	1,140	1.0%
6	French	899	0.8%
7	Polish	742	0.7%
8	German	699	0.6%
9	Other non-English	1,353	1.2%

- Data exclude language not-stated responses. Columns may not sum to 100% due to rounding.

== Politics ==
While historically many Jews (particularly working class Jews) voted for the centre-left Australian Labor Party (ALP), Jews have been a reliable demographic for the centre-right Liberal Party since the 1970s, in contrast to American Jews who primarily vote for the centrist to centre-left Democratic Party (Note: In the United States, both major parties are supportive of Israel. Despite having made inroads among Jewish voters, many perceive the Republican Party, although generally more Zionist, to be too right-wing and dominated by the Christian right. Thus, the majority of secular, Reform and Conservative Jews in the United States vote for the Democratic Party, while the majority of Orthodox Jews vote for the more socially conservative Republican Party. Furthermore, the majority of American secular and Reform Jews describe themselves as "liberal", as do a plurality of Conservative Jews (with a significant minority describing themselves as "moderate"), while a majority of Orthodox Jews describe themselves as "conservative".) but consistent with voting trends among South African Jews (many of whom now live in Australia), who typically vote for the centre-right Democratic Alliance, and with the trend towards the centre-right Conservative Party among British Jews. The shift occurred under Prime Minister Gough Whitlam, who many perceived as being too critical of Israel, in contrast to Opposition Leader and later Prime Minister Malcolm Fraser (who led the Liberal-National Coalition to a landslide victory in the 1975 federal election), who himself was of New Zealand Jewish descent through his maternal grandfather. On social issues, Australian Jewish opinions range from socially liberal to socially conservative, with a small minority being socially progressive.

Suburbs with high Jewish populations tend to vote for the Liberal Party, with the Victorian state electoral district of Caulfield in Southeastern Melbourne and the New South Wales state electoral district of Vaucluse in Sydney's Eastern Suburbs being regarded as "blue ribbon" seats that have never elected Labor members. The most affluent and Jewish suburbs in are even stronger for the Liberal Party. In the 2025 federal election, a tactical voting campaign successfully sought to re-elect Josh Burns, a Jewish member for the electoral division of Macnamara in Melbourne, by encouraging voters to preference the left-wing Australian Greens, who are anti-Zionist, last (in contrast to longstanding convention) to combat a potential Green surge seen in the 2022 federal election (primarily from the areas closer to the inner-city and around Saint Kilda). The campaign was supported by former Labor member of Macnamara Michael Danby and former Labor member for the Southern Metropolitan Region of the Victorian Legislative Council Philip Dalidakis, both of whom were Jewish and criticised Prime Minister Anthony Albanese for rejecting the campaign. In the same election, teal independent Zoe Daniel was defeated by former Liberal member Tim Wilson (who recovered the seat after marginally losing in 2022) in the blue ribbon seat of Goldstein in Melbourne (the only seat the party regained in what was a landslide defeat), partly driven by a swing among Jewish voters following the 7 October attacks by Hamas in Israel and rising incidents of antisemitism in Australia, while the traditionally blue ribbon but since redistributed seat of Wentworth re-elected teal independent Allegra Spender, who was seen as more willing to tackle antisemitism, with an increased margin (though suffered a slight swing against her in the Jewish-majority suburb of Dover Heights, which voted heavily for Liberal candidate Ro Knox, who strongly supports Israel).

Like the broader global Jewish community, while some Australian Jews are supportive of Palestine and critical of Israel and Zionism, the overwhelming majority are Zionist and a near-universal majority believe that Israel has a right to exist. A 2023 survey produced by Plus61J Media, analysed by Professor Andrew Markus at Melbourne's Monash University and published in The Jewish Independent publication found that 90% of respondents believed the Australian Jewish community should maintain close ties with Israel, 87% had a high personal connection with Israel, 85% believed Israel's existence was essential for the future of Jewish people, 80% were concerned when Israel was in danger, 77% considered themselves Zionists and 72% had family and/or close friends in Israel. However, with clear majorities closely following internal Israeli affairs and believing that the Jewish diaspora could have opinions on Israeli issues, opinions were divided on topics such as the Israeli occupation of the West Bank, whether a solution to the Israeli-Palestinian conflict was possible, whether Israeli Jews care about diaspora Jews' opinions on internal affairs and whether democracy in Israel was stable or unstable. Majorities also agreed that there was too much corruption in Israel, that Israel was undergoing democratic backsliding, that Orthodox Judaism had too much influence in Israeli society and that the 2023 judicial reform was bad for Israel. The survey also found that Australian Jews had found themselves agreeing less with Israeli policies on issues relating to Palestinians than they would have five years ago.

== Notable people ==
=== Academics ===
- Roy Clive Abraham, linguist
- Avril Alba, theologian and historian
- Bernhard Neumann, German-born British-Australian mathematician
- Peter Singer, philosopher
- Ghil'ad Zuckermann, linguist and revivalist

=== Artists and entertainers ===
- Lior Attar, singer, musician
- Danny Ben-Moshe, writer
- Claudia Black, actress
- John Bluthal, actor
- Saskia Burmeister, actress
- Deborah Conway, singer
- Bianca Dye, radio presenter
- Susie Elelman, television presenter
- Isla Fisher, actress
- Amelia Frid, Russian-born actress
- Renee Geyer, soul singer
- David Helfgott, pianist (inspired Academy Award-winning film Shine)
- Dena Kaplan, actress
- Barrie Kosky, opera director
- Ben Lee, singer, songwriter and actor
- David Malouf, writer
- Miriam Margolyes, British-Australian actress
- Olivia Newton-John, singer/songwriter
- Charlie Pickering, TV host and comedian
- Leon Pole, artist
- Ohad Rain, Australian-born Israeli singer-songwriter
- John Safran, comedian
- Troye Sivan, South African-born Australian singer, actor and model
- Elana Stone, musician
- Yael Stone, actress
- Felix Werder, German-born composer
- Yitzhak Yedid, Israeli-born composer

=== Business people ===
- Alan Finkel, Australia's Chief Scientist
- John Gandel, businessman, philanthropist
- David Gonski, businessman, philanthropist
- Solomon Lew, businessman
- Frank Lowy, Slovak-born Israeli Australian businessman
- Anthony Pratt, Australian businessman
- Richard Pratt, businessman
- Sheree Rubinstein, entrepreneur, women's business leader and advocate
- Sidney Sinclair, businessman
- Victor Smorgon, businessman
- Harry Triguboff, Chinese-born Australian businessman
- Alex Waislitz, businessman
- Nick Molnar, entrepreneur, businessman

=== Legal system ===
- James Spigelman, Former Chief Justice of New South Wales
- James Edelman, High Court Justice
- Louis Waller, legal academic and head of Monash law faculty

=== Politicians ===
- Hajnal Ban Black, Israeli-born author, politician
- Josh Burns, Macnamara MP
- Sir Zelman Cowen, politician, Governor-General of Australia
- Philip Dalidakis, politician
- Michael Danby, former Melbourne Ports MP
- Mark Dreyfus, attorney general of Australia
- Syd Einfeld, Australian politician and Jewish community leader
- Josh Frydenberg, former Kooyong MP and former deputy leader of the Liberal Party
- Sir Isaac Isaacs, judge and politician, Chief Justice of Australia, and Governor-General of Australia
- Henry Ninio, Egyptian-born Lord Mayor of Adelaide
- Martin Pakula, politician
- Kerryn Phelps, president of the AMA, former Wentworth MP
- Mark Regev, Australian-born Israeli diplomat and civil servant
- David Southwick, Caulfield MP

=== Rabbis ===
- Dr John Levi AM, First Australian born Rabbi, Emeritus Rabbi of Temple Beth Israel and founder of The King David School in Melbourne, Historian of the early Jewish community in Australia
- Raymond Apple, Senior Rabbi of the Great Synagogue of Sydney
- David Bar-Hayim, born David Mandel, head of the Machon Shilo in Israel
- Eliezer Berkovits, leading rabbinic philosopher, served as a rabbi in Sydney 1946–50
- Israel Brodie, Chief Rabbi of the Commonwealth, served as a rabbi in Australia 1923–37
- Harry Freedman, rabbi, author and translator
- Yitzchok Dovid Groner, head of the Yeshiva Centre in Melbourne, implicated in coverups of child sex abuse
- Chaim Gutnick, first head of the Rabbinical Council of Victoria
- Meir Shlomo Kluwgant, senior rabbi in Melbourne, implicated in coverups of child sex abuse
- Karen Soria, Reform rabbi, first woman to serve as a rabbi in Australia

=== Sportspeople ===
- Ashley Brown, soccer player
- Jordan Brown, soccer player
- Gavin Fingleson, Olympic silver medalist baseball player
- Jessica Fox, canoeist, Olympic gold medalist
- Noemie Fox, canoeist, Olympic gold medalist
- Jake Girdwood-Reich, soccer player
- Todd Goldstein, AFL Player for the North Melbourne Kangaroos
- Todd Greenberg, former NRL executive
- Michael Klinger, cricketer
- Jemima Montag, racewalker, Commonwealth Games gold medallist
- Jonathan Moss, former first-class cricketer for the Victoria cricket team (2000–2007). Played for Australia at the Maccabiah Games in Israel
- Phil Moss, former manager of the Central Coast Mariners in the A-League, and former player in the National Soccer League
- Zac Sapsford, soccer player
- Harry Sheezel, AFL player for the North Melbourne Kangaroos
- Steven Solomon, sprinter
- Jordi Swibel, soccer player
- Lionel Van Praag, speedway champion
- Julien Wiener, cricketer
- David Zalcberg, table tennis player

=== Other ===
- Alex Fein, activist and entrepreneur
- Sir John Monash, distinguished General in the Australian Army during World War I.
- Richard Kingsland, Royal Australian Air Force pilot during World War II, former Secretary of the Departments of Interior, Repatriation, and Veterans' Affairs
- Ikey Solomon, convict transported to Tasmania.
- Sharri Markson, journalist
- Gregory Sher, Australian soldier killed in Afghanistan
- "Fast Ed" Halmagyi, TV presenter and chef

== See also ==
- Australia/Israel & Jewish Affairs Council
- Jewish Council of Australia
- Australian Jewish Democratic Society
- Zionist Federation of Australia
- Executive Council of Australian Jewry
- Antisemitism in Australia
- Australian Association for Jewish Studies
- Australian Jews in Israel
- History of the Jews in Australia
- Israeli Australians
- List of Oceanian Jews
- Category:Jewish Australian writers
- Category:Jewish Australian history
- Gerim
