= Israeli Australians =

Israeli Australians ישראלים אוסטרלים
Total population
- Israeli; 11,035 (by birth, 2021 census); 25,778 (by ancestry, 2011 census)

Regions with significant populations
- Sydney · Melbourne

Languages
- Australian English · Hebrew · Arabic · Russian

Religion
- Judaism is the largest faith among Israeli Australians and Israelis in general · Islam · Christianity · Druze

Related ethnic groups
- Australian Jews, Arab Australians

Israeli Australians refers to Australian citizens or permanent residents who are fully or partially of Israeli descent. The population colloquially refer to themselves as Ausraelis.

The most recent 2021 Australian census recorded 11,035 Israeli Australians by birth (rather than by ancestry), being a 12.4% increase from the previous 2016 census.

The largest percentage of Israeli Australians live within the state of Victoria, closely followed by New South Wales.

The majority of Israeli Australians are Jewish. However, there are a small number of Palestinian Christians and Muslims who immigrated to Australia while originally having Israeli citizenship.

Most Israeli Australians are bilingual in Hebrew and English. There is a dedicated Hebrew language radio programme on the Special Broadcasting Service, as well as Israeli podcasts broadcast from J-Air.

There are also several notable Israeli Australian community groups including the Association of Israelis in Australia (AIA) and the Australia/Israel & Jewish Affairs Council (AIJAC).

Israeli Australians also host and participate in a number of notable community events such as Yom HaZikaron and Yom Ha'atzmaut, as well as Israeli film festivals and traditional dance classes and performances.

Politically, Israeli Australians are diverse in their perspectives on the Israeli–Palestinian conflict and other Israeli domestic issues. However, the group occasionally is cited in mainstream media, such as controversy surrounding the 2016 VCE exams as well as the 2022 Sydney Festival.

== History ==
It has been suggested that people from the geographic region of Israel have been immigrating to Australia since the nineteenth century. However, since the state of Israel's establishment in 1948, the population of the area doubled due to the arrival of Jewish people from all over the world immigrating to Israel. Israeli immigrants were first recorded in Australia in 1954.

Many Israeli Australians moved from Europe to Australia after the Second World War, then returned to Israel to start families before immigrating to Australia.

67.7% of Israel-born Australians arrived before 2007, compared to the total oversea-born population of 61.8%. Since then, the Israeli-born Australian population has steadily grown by several hundred per year.

== Demographics ==
=== Age and gender ===
The Israeli Australian population is slightly older than the average for the total Australian population with a median age of 45 years compared to 38 years.

In the most recent census (2021), 6,104 male Israeli Australians were recorded and 4,931 females. This equates to a gender ratio of 124 males per 100 females.

=== Location ===
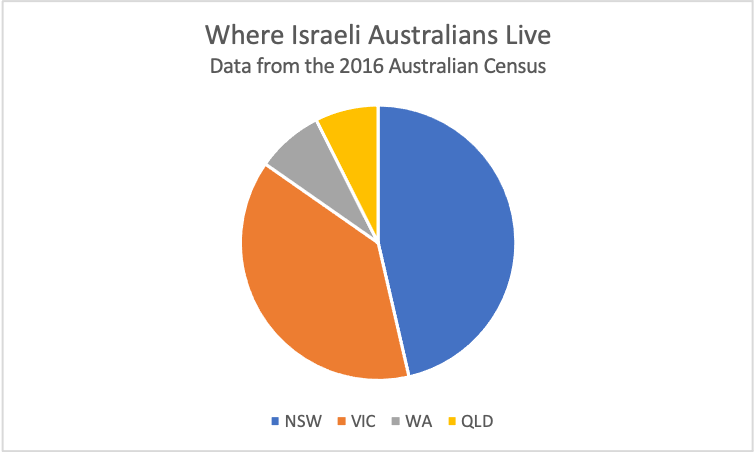
Pie Chart Depicting where Israeli Australians Live

It is indicated that Israeli Australians live predominantly within urban areas of Victoria and New South Wales. 85% (7,947) of all Israeli Australians live in these two states. The largest population of Israeli Australians reside in Victoria (4,353), followed by New South Wales (3,594), Queensland (738) and Western Australia (697). The 2016 census report does not include population in the Northern Territory, South Australia, Tasmania or the Australian Capital Territory.

Within Victoria, 80% of all Israeli Australians live in the Glen Eira, described by Daeshi Lawrence to be “the heart of Melbourne's Jewish community”. Within New South Wales many Israeli Australians live in the Eastern Suburbs of Sydney.

=== Language ===
The main languages spoken by Israeli Australians are Hebrew, English and Arabic. 6,874 Israeli Australians reported speaking a language other than English at home.

The Special Broadcasting Service in Australia presents a Hebrew language radio show and maintains a website and J-Air hosts a Jewish Australian internet radio broadcast in four languages.

=== Median income ===
In 2021 the median weekly income for Israeli Australians over the age of 15 years old was $1032 AUD. The median income for the total overseas-born population of Australia was $784 AUD and for the Australian born population $823 AUD.

=== Employment ===
For Israeli Australians aged 15 years and older, there was a workforce participation rate of 87.9% and an unemployment rate of 5.4%. This is similar to the total Australian population with a participation rate of 87.1% and 5.1% unemployment rate.

Of this population 66.8% of all working Israeli Australians were employed in managerial, professional or trade occupations.

=== Education and qualifications ===
According to the 2021 census, 44.4% of Israeli Australians over 15 years old “had a Bachelor Degree level and above”. This is 18.1% higher than that of the total Australian population.

=== Religion ===
In 2021, 69.8% of Israeli Australians stated that they were religious. Of this portion 6,902 identified with Judaism, 537 as Catholic and 269 as Eastern Orthodox.

Despite census data, there is growing literature indicating Israeli Australian detachment from the wider Australian Jewish Community. Ran Porat claims that Israeli Australians rank the highest in terms of low identification with the Australian Jewish Community and exhibit a low sense of belonging and lack of engagement. In a survey completed by Gen17 close to a quarter of Israeli Australians indicated they felt either "somewhat connected" or "very unconnected" to the wider Jewish community and 20% stated they considered belonging to the Jewish Community as either "very unimportant" pr "fairly unimportant".

The 2021 census does not mention Muslim Australians from Israel, who may not self-identify as Israeli. At the time of this census Australia had not recognised Palestine as a state, in 2001 the Australian census collected ancestral data of its population and found 7000 Palestinian Australians. While the region of Palestine lies within Israel, Palestinian Australians are not counted in recent census data unless they choose to identify themselves. Accordingly, there is a lack of clear data on Islamic Israelis and Palestinians in Australia.

== Military service ==
Some Israeli families have migrated to Australia from Israel to protect their teenage children from forced military service in the Israel Defense Forces (IDF) and the associated indoctrination. In 2026 there siblings from Israel were granted the right to reapply for protection visas in Australia when their father's work visa expired during the Gaza war. The main reasons that the tribunal determined to be legitimate were that Israeli imprisonment as conscientious objectors constituted political persecution and a belief that the siblings would be forced to “engage in breaches of international humanitarian law” during compulsory military service.

== Community events ==
The Israeli Australian community also holds and participates in several annual events and celebrations. For example, Israeli Australians make up the largest proportion of attendees at Yom Hazikaron ceremonies, the memorial day for those who died defending the state of Israel, and Yom Haatzmaut community events, the celebration of Israeli independence.

As well as this, an annual Israeli film festival is held in Australia, promoted by the Israeli Embassy in Australia. The Festival is called “Jerusalem Cinematheque New Zealand and Australia Film Series” and consists of 12 weekly screenings.

Israeli dancing classes and performances also take place throughout the year within Australia. Israeli folk dancing acts as both a way for Israeli Australians to stay in touch with their community and has been called "a Unifier of the Jewish Community".

As well as this prominent Israeli dancing groups perform at festivals throughout Australia. In January 2022 Batsheva Dance Company partnered with Israeli choreographer Ohad Naharin to bring Israeli dance to mainstream Australia through the event Decadance at the Sydney Festival in 2022.

=== Community organisations ===
- Association of Israelis in Australia (AIA)
- Australia/Israel & Jewish Affairs Council (AIJAC)
- Ozraelis
- Executive Council of Australian Jewry (ECAJ)

== Politics ==
Given political tension within the state of Israel since the mid twentieth century, there are varied stances on the conflict within the Israeli Australian community. 76% of Israeli Australians consider themselves Zionists, 76% keep up with the news in Israel and 86% feel "a sense of responsibility to ensure that the State of Israel continues to exist". On top of this between 2008 and 2012 400 Israeli Australians returned to Israel for compulsory military service

The co-CEO of the Executive Council of Australian Jewry Alex Ryvchin told the Australian Broadcasting Company:

“"[In] the Australian-Jewish community overwhelmingly there is support for a two-state solution”.

Notwithstanding this statement, Ryvchin also supports Israeli retaliation and has openly criticised Palestinian leadership.

In 2016, Israeli Australian political groups were reported on by the Australian media as they stood against the Victorian Curriculum and Assessment Authority following the inclusion of a play by Palestinian Australian playwright Samah Sabawi, arguing that the play was one sided and would create a hostile environment for Jewish students.

On top of this Israeli Australian community groups such as the Australia/Israel & Jewish Affairs Council, use their platform as a means to push political messages. The Australia/Israel & Jewish Affairs Council seeks to limit anti-Israeli bias and publish their own media in order to provide an Israeli Australian perspective on the conflict. The Australia/Israel & Jewish Affairs Council also advise the Australian Government on how best to legislatively address antisemitism.

In 2022 the Israeli Embassy in Australia partially sponsored the Sydney Festival and more specifically the production of Ohad Naharin's Decadance by the Sydney Dance Company. For Israeli Australians this acts as a way to bring their culture into the mainstream light and act as a community event to celebrate Israeli Dance. However, the partnership with the Israeli embassy has resulted in boycotts from three arts organisations and several acts scheduled to perform at the festival. Such acts include artist Khaled Sabsabi, rapper Barkindji, dance company Bindi Bosses, the Arab Theatre Studio, the Bankstown Poetry Slam and comedian Nazeem Hussain.

Overall, Israeli Australians are more critical of Israel than the wider Jewish Community in Australia. Ran Porat found that 71% of Israeli Australians believe that there is too much corruption in Israel compared to 46% for the total Australian Jewish population. As well as this, 52% of Israeli Australians believe that people who are not Jewish suffer in Israel, compared to 35% for the total Jewish population in Australia.

== Notable people ==
- Hajnal Ban – a former Australian politician who stood for the Liberal National Party but was dropped as their candidate in 2010 due to criminal allegations.
- Frank Lowy – a prominent international businessman, known for starting Westfield Corp. He currently runs the Lowy Family Group with his sons David, Peter and Steven.
- Lior – a singer, songwriter and actor who is best known for his debut album Autumn Flow, however more recently has taken up many acting roles in musical theatre productions. He is also known for writing the closing song on popular Australian children's television show Giggle and Hoot.
- Yitzhak Yedid – a classical concert musical composer who has written more than 50 pieces and has won several musical awards such as the Canadian Azrieli Music Prize.
- Ghil'ad Zuckermann – a linguist at the University of Adelaide who specialises in revivalistics the study of reclaiming, revitalising and reinvigorating lost languages.
- Miron Bleiberg – a former football (soccer) manager who coached the team formerly known as Queensland Roar until 2006 and Gold Coast United until December 2021.
- Ashley Brown – a former football (soccer) player Melbourne Victory who played for the team from 2010 to 2014.
- Ohad Rein – a musician better known by his stage name Old Man River. Rein is based in Byron Bay and has received an APRA award for his work. More recently he has led several yoga workshops across the globe and manages Bliss Ball Studio.
- Neomy Storch – an Australian linguist at Melbourne University. After being born in Poland, Storch migrated to Israel with her family before relocating again to Australia. She is a prominent academic in her field.
- Nitza Lowenstein – a long-term broadcaster and producer for SBS Hebrew.
- Moshe Lang – Australian family therapist who moved to Australia from Israel in 1961.

== See also ==
- Australian Jews in Israel
- History of the Jews in Australia
- Assyrian Australians
- Iranian Australians
- Russian Australians
- Australia–Israel relations
- Israeli New Zealanders
- Anglo-Israelis
