= Nitza =

Nitza is a given name. Notable people with the name include:

- Nitza Quiñones Alejandro (born 1951), United States district judge, Pennsylvania
- Nitza Ben-Dov (born 1950), Professor of Hebrew and Comparative Literature at the University of Haifa
- Nitza Lowenstein (born 1953), retired Israeli-Australian radio broadcaster and producer
- Nitza Margarita Cintrón (born 1950), Puerto Rican scientist at NASA's Johnson Space Center
- Nitza Metzger-Szmuk (born 1945), Israeli architect and Emet Prize laureate in architecture
- Nitza Morán (born 1970), Puerto Rican politician and businessperson
- Nitza Saul (born 1950), Israeli actress on British television during the 1980s
- Nitza Tufiño (born 1949), visual artist from Mexico City
- Nitza Villapol (1923–1998), chef, teacher, cookbook writer, TV host in Cuba

== See also ==
- Nitzani
