= Israeli New Zealanders =

People

Israeli New Zealanders ישראלים ניו זילנדרים
Total population
- Israeli; 1,353 (2013 Census)

Regions with significant populations
- Auckland · Wellington

Languages
- New Zealand English · Hebrew · Arabic · Russian

Religion
- Judaism is the largest faith among Israeli New Zealanders and Israelis in general · Christianity

Related ethnic groups
- New Zealand Jews, Arab New Zealanders

Israeli New Zealanders refers to New Zealand citizens or permanent residents who are fully or partially of Israeli descent. There are about 1,353 Israelis in New Zealand. The majority of Israeli New Zealanders are Jewish.

Most Israeli New Zealanders are bilingual in Hebrew and English.

Thousands of Israelis visit New Zealand every summer.

== Notable Israeli New Zealanders ==
- Jo Aleh, sailor

== See also ==
- History of the Jews in New Zealand
- Israel–New Zealand relations
- Asian New Zealanders
- Israeli Australians
- Israeli diaspora
- Immigration to New Zealand
- Anglo-Israelis
