= Australian Jews in Israel =

Total population
- 10,000–12,000

Regions with significant populations
- Jerusalem, Tel Aviv

Languages
- Hebrew, Australian English

Religion
- Judaism

Related ethnic groups
- Israeli Australians, American Jews, South African Jews, Israeli Jews

Australian Jews in Israel refers to Australian-born individuals of Jewish descent, who have emigrated to Israel (Aliyah in Jewish communities). Jews understand Aliyah to be a spiritual journey as a result of their emotional connection to the land of their people. Since 1950, when the Law of Return was passed by the Israeli Knesset (parliament), diasporic Jews have been given legal provisions to acquire citizenship in Israel based on their Jewish heritage. The total population of Israel, as of December 2019, was 9,316,000 and, according to the Australian Department of Foreign Affairs and Trade, there were roughly 10,000–12,000 Australians living in Israel, suggested by data from the most recent census that was held in 2016.

== History ==
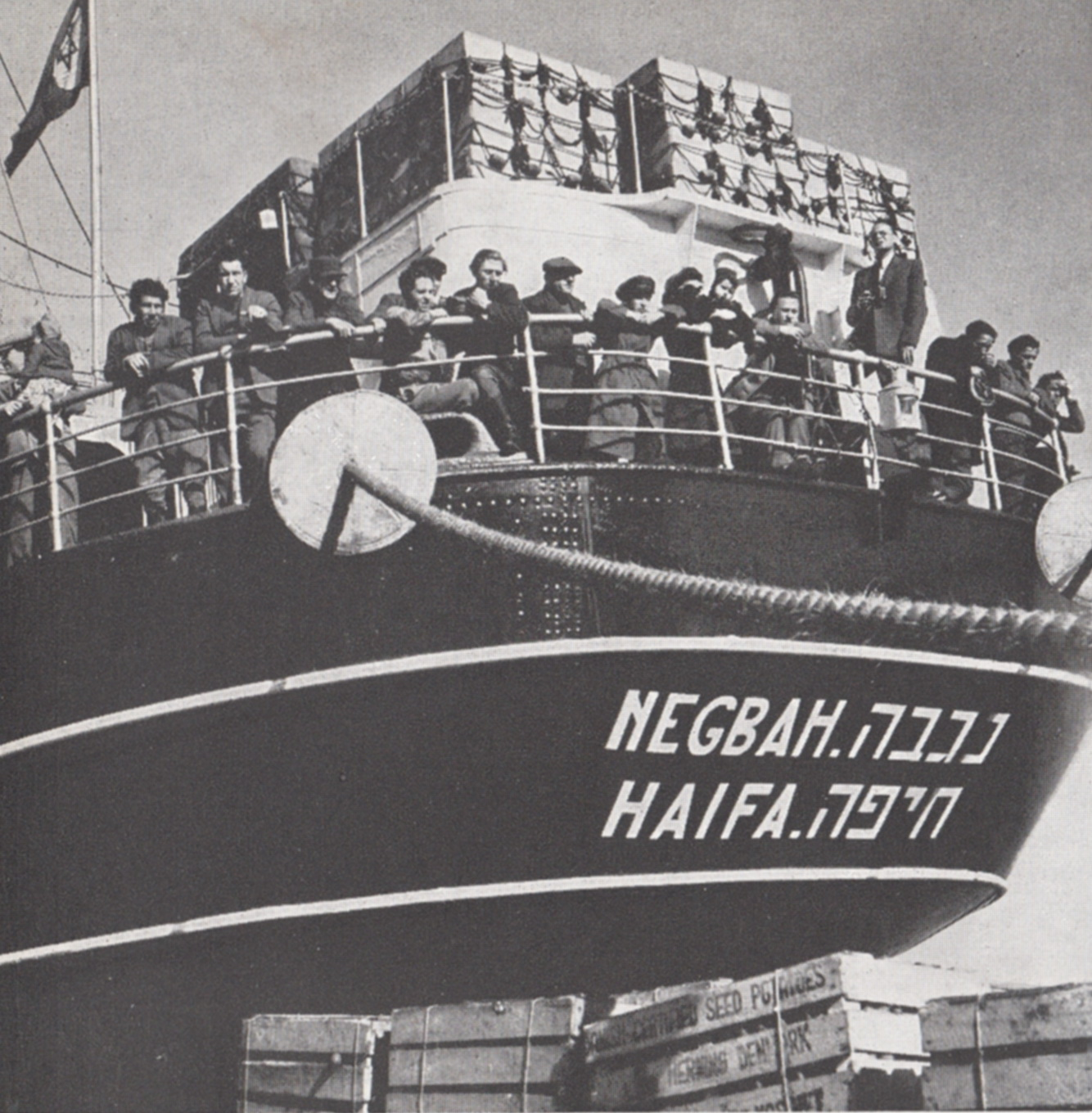
New immigrants arriving at the Haifa port after the establishment of Israel in 1948.

In 1948, the State of Israel was established, allowing Jews from around the world to make Aliyah, without difficulty. Many understood the establishment of Israel as a public way of making up for the atrocities of the Holocaust. When the Jews in the concentration camps were released at the end of World War II, the large majority of them were forced to immigrate to other nations, however, due to the difficulty of gaining access into Israel, many fled elsewhere, including Australia, who received between 7000 and 8000 Jewish refugees from countries including Germany, Czechoslovakia and Austria. These migration patterns led to Australian Jews feeling a strong connection to the State of Israel, as they had a land that was known as the land of the Jewish people on a global scale. Prior to the establishment of Israel, the land was home to approximately 600,000 Jews, however, by 2007 the total number of Jews living in Israel was 5.5 million. According to census data that was released by the Central Bureau of Statistics on 31 December 2019, there were 9,136,000 people living in Israel and 74.1% were Jewish. From 2008 to 2012, more than 400 Australian Jews moved to Israel and most of them have done compulsory military service. There was an almost 50 percent increase in immigration from Australia to Israel between 2009 and 2010. There was a 45 percent increase in percentage of immigration in 2010, the highest of the English-speaking countries; 240 Australians moved to Israel, up from 165 in 2009.

== Immigrants ==
The term ‘immigrant’ refers to an individual that has left their country of origin and taken up permanent residency elsewhere. In Israel, immigrants are referred to as ‘new olim’. In 1995, the population of the West Bank, a section of land that is under Israeli military control, had a significant number of new immigrants (olim) from North America as well as Australia and New Zealand. 2.1% of residents located in the West Bank were citizens born in Israel while the number of citizens who had made Aliyah was found to be 9.4% of the West Bank's population. Australia is said to have the highest rate per capita, in the Western world, of Jews making Aliyah. In 2019, within a time frame of 9 months, Israel became home to nearly 30,000 new immigrants, of which 143 were Australian.

== Demographics ==
Between 2018 and 2019, Monash University, located in Melbourne, surveyed 386 Australian Jews who had immigrated to Israel (Aliyah). The results provided extensive information regarding their country of birth, previous city of residence, age, gender, religious observance, motivations for immigrating, education, Hebrew fluency, economic status and type of residency.

=== Demographics ===
The most dominant group amongst the Olim were the Australian-born Jews, who made up 81% of the surveyed population. The remaining percentage revealed that they were born in other parts of the world before migrating to Australia.

Country of Birth
	Number	Percentage (%)
Australia	311	81
Europe, United States, and Canada	29	8
Israel	18	5
South Africa	15	4
England	11	3
Argentina	1	0.3
Egypt	1	0.3
Total	386	100

Previous City of Residence
1. Melbourne (64.0%)
2. Sydney (27.0%)
3. Perth (6.00%)
4. Other parts of Australia (3.00%)

=== Previous City of Residence ===
More than half of the participants, involved in the survey, listed that they previously lived in Melbourne before they immigrated to Israel. However, Sydney was also home to a significant number of Australian Jews who moved to Israel.

=== Age ===
The participants who completed the survey were between the ages of 18 and 80. The most dominant age range was 18-39, followed closely by the age range of 40-59.

Age of Australian Immigrants
	Percentage (%)
18-39	41
40-59	33
60+	26
Total	100

Gender
1. Female (57.0%)
2. Male (43.0%)

=== Gender ===
The percentage of female immigrants was slightly larger than male immigrants; however, more females participated in the survey, which must be taken into account.

=== Denominational Affiliation ===
Jews in Australia define themselves differently to those in Israel due to the variation in denominational terminology. In Australia, Jews are more widely spread across eight denominations of Judaism while Israeli citizens find themselves divided into four denominations. Australian Jews choose to either associate with no denomination or associate as being Conservative, Reform, Strictly Orthodox, Modern Orthodox, Traditional, Secular or Mixed Religion. Israeli Jews are either Religious (Modern Hebrew: דָתִי), Secular (Modern Hebrew: חִלּוֹנִי), Traditional (Modern Hebrew: מָסוֹרתִי) or Reform.

Denominational Affiliation
Israeli Identification		Australian Identification	
	Percentage(%)		Percentage (%)
Religious	57	No Denomination	8
Secular	26	Conservative	3
Traditional	13	Reform	3
Reform	1	Strictly Orthodox	4
Other	3	Modern Orthodox	53
		Traditional	14
		Secular	9
		Mixed Religion	7
Total	100	Total	100

=== Motivations for emigration ===
==== Influential Factors ====
A survey conducted in 2018-2019 prompted participants to evaluate the influential effect of various factors and how they did or didn't impact their final decision to leave Australia and permanently move to Israel. They were asked to rate the extent to which these factors influenced their final decision and were given three options to choose from for each factor - to a great extent; to a small extent; or not at all. These influential factors included both religious and secular aspects of life.

Motivations for emigrating to Israel
	Extent (%)		
	Great	Small	None
Desire to live amongst Jews	69	25	5
Religious beliefs	50	32	18
Zionism	81	13	6
Desire for children to grow up in a Jewish environment	67	18	14
Children's education	51	23	25
Desire to join relatives and friends who already moved to Israel	23	32	44
Desire to find a partner/spouse in Israel	30	26	43
Career opportunities	10	28	61
Israeli health care system	6	22	71

=== Jewish Educational Background ===
==== Education ====
Difficulties with Hebrew
1. No difficulties (15.0%)
2. Some difficulties (62.0%)
3. Many difficulties (23.0%)

Research found that there was a strong correlation between Jewish education and immigration to Israel. Overall results demonstrated that 70% of all new immigrants to Israel had received some form of Jewish education at day-school; nearly 45% of those who spent more than a year visiting Israel were educated at a Jewish day-school; and 25% of individuals, who visited Israel for less than a year, had experienced a Jewish education of some form.

==== Hebrew Fluency ====
Only a small percentage of participants revealed that they had no difficulties with the language upon arrival to Israel, while a large percentage admitted to experiencing difficulties with the language.

=== Socioeconomics ===
Economic Status
1. Living comfortably (75.0%)
2. Just getting along (21.0%)
3. Poor (5.00%)

==== Residence ====
New immigrants either reside in the city, a small town or on a kibbutz. Statistics show that currently 58% live in the city; 27% live in a small town; and 15% live on a kibbutz; however, upon arrival to Israel 78% lived in the city, while 5% lived in a small town and 12% lived on a kibbutz.

Type of Residence
	Upon Arrival (%)	Currently (%)
City	78	58
Small Town	5	27
Kibbutz	12	15
Other	5	0
Total	100	100

==== Economic Status ====
Majority of the participants revealed that they were either living comfortably or getting along, while a small percentage claimed they were poor.

== Notable people ==
- Raymond Apple, senior rabbi
- David Bar-Hayim, Orthodox rabbi and head of the Shilo Institute
- Yosl Bergner, painter
- Yuval Freilich, épée fencer
- Mark Regev, diplomat and civil servant
- Dvora Waysman, author
- Ben Zygier, veteran of the Israel Defense Forces accused of espionage

== See also ==
- Anglo-Israelis
- Australia–Israel relations
- History of the Jews in Australia
- Israelis in Australia
- Jewish ethnic divisions
