= Australian Jewish media =

News publications focusing on Jewish issues

The Australian Jewish community has a weekly printed publication, The Australian Jewish News, and a long history of boutique publications and zines. Many blogs and online magazines have proliferated reflecting the community's multitudinous religious, political, and cultural orientations.

== News publications ==
In 1985, The Australian Jewish News (also known as The AJN), was founded. They have a weekly print edition and a website; owned by Robert Magid and edited by Gareth Narunsky.

In 2008, J-Wire an online publication was founded. It is owned and operated by Henry Benjamin.

In 2015, The Jewish Independent was founded. It publishes local news, opinion pieces, as well as features on culture and community.

A recent entry into the market is the free monthly hard-copy newspaper, The Jewish Report, which bills itself as a tool for fostering social cohesion.'

== Literary publications ==
Alongside zines, and other community newsletters, Melbourne Jewry produced two literary journals, the Melbourne Chronicle, in the 1980s and Generation Magazine. The Melbourne Chronicle initially produced a companion Yiddish edition; however, like the Australian Jewish News, which also published additional material in Yiddish, the dwindling Yiddish-speaking market proved incapable of supporting it.

After Generation Magazine ceased publication in the 1990s, there was a period in which there was no dedicated publication for Australian Jewish literary expression. In 2009, however, a group of young Jewish writers launched the online magazine, Galus Australis. It billed itself as a pluralist space for the discussion of Jewish Australian ideas and stories, but it ceased publication in 2015.

Jewish Women of Words is the newest literary venture in the Australian Jewish media scene.

== Jewish blogs ==
Australian Jewry's religious and political diversity is best reflected in its blogs. The conservative collective blog, known as Jews Down Under/ publishes opinion pieces arguing from a right wing perspective; while the Australian Jewish Democratic Society publishes content from a left wing perspective.

Notable individual blogs have similarly provided the community with a platform for expression. The first such blog, in 2009, to be reported in the wider Australian media was The Sensible Jew, written by Alex Fein. It provided controversial critiques of communal politics. Blogs such as Pitputim and The Fifth Chelek, meanwhile, concern themselves more with religious argument.

== Radio and television ==
Radio and television have also provided the Jewish community with a broadcast outlet. The long running TV show, The Shtick, first airing on channel 31 and then moving to YouTube, features stories and segments about Jewish life in Melbourne. Melbourne Jewish Radio has also had a long tradition and the SBS station currently provides a service in Hebrew. The community attained a radio licence in 2011 and established the station, LionFM; however, this was short lived as its license was revoked. In its place is the community run radio organisation, J-Air, which bills itself as, 'the Jewish voice of Melbourne'.
