= Moshe Lang =

Australian family therapist, clinical psychologist and author

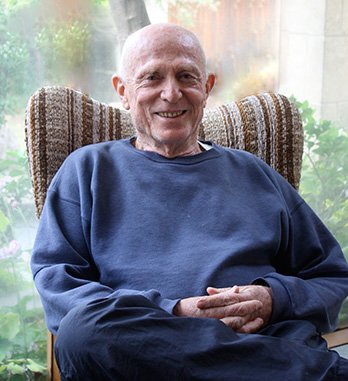
- Born: 1939 (age 86–87); Israel
- Education: Dip. Psychology, M.A.
- Occupations: Family therapist, clinical psychologist (maps) and author
- Years active: 1965–present
- Known for: Family Therapy in Australia
- Notable work: Books: Children's Depression Scale (CDS), Corrupting The Young, A Family In Therapy, Resilience, The Answer Within; DVD: Behind Closed Doors
- Title: President, VAFT (1982–1984); Foundation President, ANZJFT (1979–1988)
- Awards: Life Membership, AAFT (1992); Recipient of the Inaugural Award of Special Services to Family Therapy, ANZJFT (1994)
- Honours: Keynote Address at the Inaugural Family Therapy Conference in Melbourne (1980)
- Website: https://moshelang.com.au

Moshe Lang (born 1939) is an Australian family therapist, clinical psychologist (MAPS) and author. He is one of the pioneers of family therapy in Australia. Lang has published and taught extensively in his professional area, both in Australia and worldwide.

== Early life ==
Lang was born in Israel in 1939 and immigrated to Australia in 1961. He studied psychology at the University of Melbourne.

== Career ==
From 1965 to 1979, Lang was senior psychologist at the Bouverie Clinic, as well as director of training. During a sabbatical, in 1975, Lang worked in Ramat-Chen Mental Health Clinic in Israel. In 1979, Lang founded Williams Road Family Therapy Centre – the first independent centre of its kind in Australia. He was co-director of the Centre, with Dr. Brian Stagoll, from 1981 to 1997. Lang remained involved with the Centre until 2012, when he became director of Williams Road Psychotherapy Centre.

Lang was Foundation President of the Australian and New Zealand Journal of Family Therapy (ANZJFT) from 1979 to 1988 and President of the Victorian Association of Family Therapists (VAFT), now known as the Australian Association of Family Therapy (AAFT), from 1982 to 1984.

In 1994, Moshe was Recipient of the Inaugural Award of Special Services to Family Therapy from ANZJFT and, in 1992, he was awarded Life Membership from AAFT. In 1980, Moshe gave the keynote address at the Inaugural Family Therapy Conference in Melbourne 1980.

In addition to his clinical practice, Moshe is a prolific author and educator. His work includes a number of books, an educational DVD set, as well as radio and podcast interviews.

=== Key interest areas ===
Moshe has published extensively on themes ranging from therapy with children and adolescents, couples therapy, depression, eating disorders, Holocaust Survivors and their families, trans-generational trauma, school refusal, suicide and teaching family therapy.

== Publications ==
Moshe has authored and co-authored numerous peer-reviewed journal articles, chapters in compilations, and books. His work has been translated and published in other languages. The Children's Depression Scale (CDS), co-authored with Miriam Tisher, has been used in many countries to research depression in children, and has been translated into Spanish, Italian, Dutch, Japanese, Hindu and Arabic. His other books are similarly highly regarded, having been extensively reviewed and on best seller lists, with some titles have been translated and published in other languages, such as Hebrew and French.

=== Storytelling and critical appraisal ===
Much of Moshe's published work demonstrates two core values. The first being the value of storytelling as a medium for learning. In his books Corrupting the Young and Resilience, co-authored with his wife Tesse Lang, Moshe uses a collection of short to medium stories to give readers a view into the clinician's room and insight into how family therapy works. Moshe offers "a journeyman style of learning... the reader being left to come to their own construction; where the author, therapist and teacher facilitates rather than instructs". With the story format, Moshe "calls upon the imagination as well as the intellect and leads to deeper insight".

The other core value demonstrated in Moshe's work is the importance of exposing one's practice for critical appraisal. He was one of the pioneers in Australia of video recording his work and writing in some depth about the subtleties of doing family therapy. Further, he invited other psychotherapy professionals to provide commentary on his clinical practice, such as in his book A Family in Therapy, co-authored with Peter McCallum, and its updated republication The Answer Within. Moshe continued this practice of invited commentary for a number of his major journal articles. With the release of his highly praised DVD-set Behind Closed Doors, Moshe further expanded the format of making his work transparent by demonstration, and thereby open to review.

== Bibliography ==
=== Books ===
- Lang, T. & Lang, M. (1986). Corrupting The Young: And Other Stories of a Family Therapist. Victoria, Australia: Rene Gordon. ISBN 0-94920-801-9
- McCallum, P. & Lang, M. (1989). A Family in Therapy. Victoria, Australia: McPhee Gribble/Penguin. ISBN 0-14-012078-5
- Lang, M. & McCallum, P. (2000). The Answer Within: A Family in Therapy Re-Examined. Melbourne, Australia: ACER Press. ISBN 0-86431-333-0
- Lang, M. & Tisher, M. (2004). Children's Depression Scale (CDS) (3rd ed.). Melbourne, Australia: ACER Press.
- Lang, M. & Lang, T. (2007) Resilience: Timeless Stories of a Family Therapist (revised ed.). Melbourne, Australia: PsychOz Publications. ISBN 1-86330-459-2

=== DVD ===
- Lang, M. (2012). Behind Closed Doors: Two therapy session with Moshe Lang [2-DVD Set]. James, T. (Producer/Director) & Wright, T. (Executive Producer). Filmed by December Media. Melbourne, Australia: Psych Oz Publications.

=== Selected articles / chapters ===
- Stagoll, B., Lang, M. & Goding, G.A. (1979). A Model for Family Therapy Training: Based on the Parallel Processes between Training and Treatment. Australian Journal of Family Therapy, 1(1), 35–42.
- Lang, M. & McCallum, P. (1980). Strategic Family Therapy: Three Case Histories. Australian Family Physician, 9(11), 780–784.
- Stagoll, B. & Lang, M. (1980). Climbing the Family Tree: Working with Genograms. Australian Journal of Family Therapy, 1(4), 161–170.
- Lang, M. (1981). Key Note Address: First Australian Family Therapy Conference: ‘Family Therapy for the Eighties’. Australian Journal of Family Therapy, 2(2), 48–55.
- Lang, M. & McCallum, P. (1981). Incompletely Fractured Families. Australian Journal of Family Therapy, 2(4), 169–174.
- Lang, M. & Lang, T. (1981). Debbie and Her Slurping Stomach. Australian Journal of Family Therapy, 3(1), 3–26.
- Lang, M. (1982). School Refusal: An Empirical Study and System Analysis. Australian Journal of Family Therapy, 3(2), 93–107.
- Lang, M. (1982). Bad Therapy – A Way of Learning. In F. Kaslow (Ed.), International Book of Family Therapy (pp. 447–459). New York, NY: Brunner/Mazel Publishers.
- Lang, M. (1984). Bad Therapy: A Way of Learning. Family Therapy Networker, 3(2), 40–44.
- Tisher, M., Lang-Takac, E. & Lang, M. (1992). The Children’s Depression Scale: Review of Australian and Overseas Experience. Australian Journal of Psychology, 44(1), 27–35.
- Lang, M. (1994). The Long Shadow. Generation, 4(1), 22–32.
- Lang, M. (1995). Silence: Therapy with Holocaust Survivors and their Families. Australian and New Zealand Journal of Family Therapy 16(1), 1–10.
- Lang, M. (1995). The Shadow of Evil. The Family Therapy Networker, Sept–Oct. ed., 54–67.
- Lang, M. (1998). After the Holocaust: Therapy with Survivors and their Families. In U.P. Gielen & A.L. Comunian (Eds.), The Family and Family Therapy in International Perspective (pp. 314–354). Trieste, Italy: Edizioni LINT Trieste.
- Lang M. (2002). ‘Then and Now’: How being Jewish has influenced my work as a Psychotherapist. Psychotherapy in Australia, 8(3), 22–28.

== Teaching family therapy ==
Lang spent his early career at the Bouverie Clinic under Dr Geoff Goding – broadly regarded as the person most instrumental in introducing family therapy to Australia. In 1979, when he founded Williams Road Family Therapy Centre, Lang envisioned "an independent family therapy institute away from the constraints of bureaucracies", according to Stagoll. The founding of the Centre was a positive development that made its own contribution to the flourishing of family therapy in Australia. It created a collegial atmosphere for learning through its summer schools, in addition to having an open system of working and an "open door policy" for its students.

In addition to his work at Williams Road Family Therapy Centre, Lang has delivered numerous other presentation lectures and workshops on clinical psychotherapy and family therapy. According to Stagoll, Lang is a "master therapist, with an extraordinary ability to listen and find solutions without ever getting boxed into whatever the reigning ideology is. He taught me to always attend to the experience and requests of the patient and family. Our loyalty is not to the system, but to our clients." Lang is well known for his unique teaching style which is marked by clarity, humour and empathy. Carolyn Quadrio states that "Moshe’s charm [comes] from his gentle worldliness".

== Commentary on family therapy ==
As an expert commentator, Lang has spoken on family therapy and clinical psychology both in his professional sphere and to the wider public audience. He has been regularly interviewed in print, and on radio and podcast. In 2016, after being interviewed on We All Wear It Differently, a podcast for psychologist professionals, Lang was invited to be a regular commentator on the segment Mondays with Moshe.

Lang speaks on a broad spectrum of topics – from ones of levity, such as 'Humour in Life and Therapy', to more solemn ones, such as his work with Holocaust survivors. According to Stagoll, it is Lang's "courage to enter terrible and violent realms of abuse, torture and terror", such as with Holocaust survivors, that demonstrate "the very best work in Family Therapy". He goes on to say that "together with [his] clients, [Lang has] been able to maintain a moral clarity and find a capacity to imagine words and stories that can help people move beyond deadly shames and amnesias. [Lang dares] to speak the unspeakable, and name that which has never been named. By doing this [he helps] reconnect people to both their old communities, and new ones, including communities dedicated explicitly to Human Rights. This work does not deny reality, but openly and honestly confronts it, to find ways to a better place, of justice and remembering."
