= One Roof Women =

One Roof Women is a women-focused coworking and business-support organisation founded by former corporate lawyer Sheree Rubinstein and strategist Gianna Wurzl. Its model combined shared workspaces with business and start-up events, workshops, and access to services including legal, financial, fundraising, and communications support.

One Roof established coworking spaces in Melbourne and Los Angeles and in 2015 expanded to include a women's coworking space in Sydney founded by Catriona Wallace. In 2016, it took over a coworking and office space in Southbank, Melbourne.

== History ==
One Roof Women was founded by a former corporate lawyer Sheree Rubinstein, and US-based strategist Gianna Wurzl. In 2015, after establishing coworking spaces in Melbourne and Los Angeles, Rubinstein and Wurzl incorporated a Sydney women's coworking space, founded by Catriona Wallace.

The One Roof model first looked at converting under-utilized physical spaces to transform them into shared workspaces for women. Its services included business and start-up events and workshops, yoga and meditation classes, and access to legal, finance, fundraising, and communications services.

In April 2016, One Roof took over space in Southbank, containing co-working and office spaces. One Roof's charity partner was SHE, run by Melbourne-based non-profit YGAP, which operated accelerator programs in Kenya, South Africa, and Australia.
