= Carolyn Quadrio =

Australian psychiatrist

Carolyn Quadrio AM
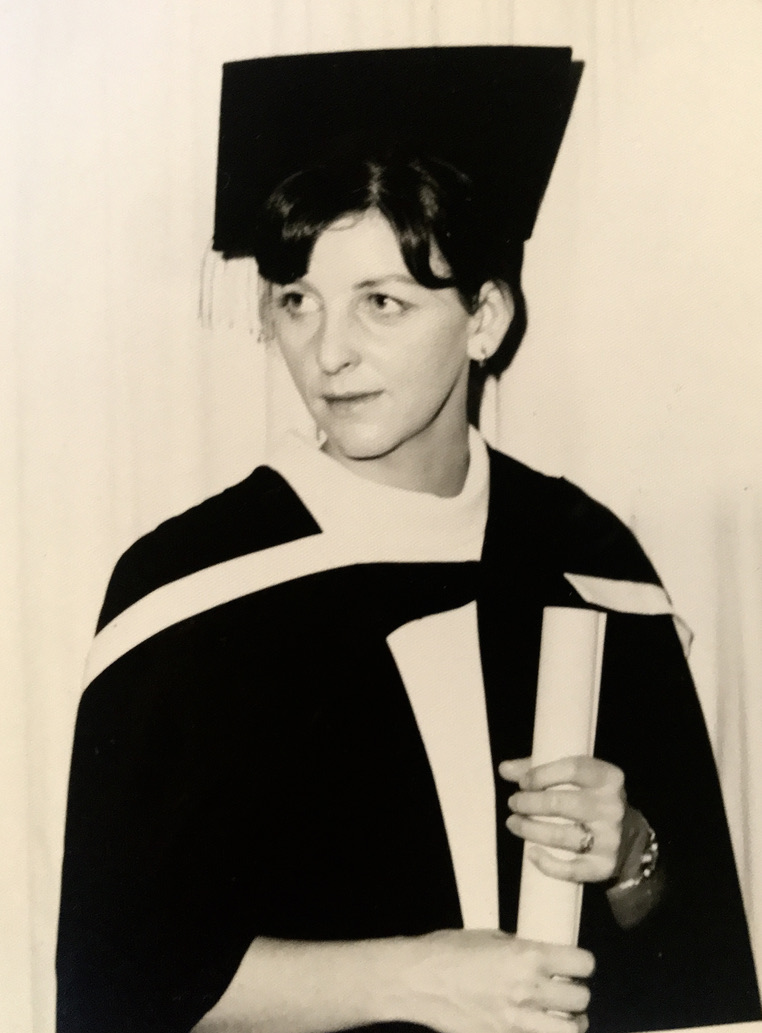
- 1966 graduation
- Born: 5 January 1943 (age 83); Perth, Western Australia
- Occupation: Psychiatrist

Carolyn Quadrio is an Australian psychiatrist and recipient of the 2024 Medal of the Order of Australia award for her "significant service to psychiatry". An Adjunct Professor at the University of New South Wales, Quadrio is a Fellow of the Royal Australian and New Zealand College of Psychiatrists (FRANZCP).

Quadrio has made significant contributions to both fields of Psychiatry and Family Therapy. In 1989, she co-founded and coordinated the Masters of Psychotherapy postgraduate program at University of New South Wales collaborating with The Prince of Wales Hospital.

== Education ==
Born in Perth, Western Australia, Quadrio studied at the University of Western Australia, receiving a Bachelor's degree in Medicine and Surgery (1966). Awarded a Diploma in Psychological Medicine (with Distinction) from The University of Otago, New Zealand (1971). She was the first extramural student accepted into the program. She became a Fellow of the Royal Australian and New Zealand College of Psychiatrists in 1973 and a member of the Faculty of Child and Adolescent Psychiatry (RANZCP) in 1987. In 1998 Quadrio completed her Doctoral dissertation at the University of Sydney.

== Career and research ==
Quadrio's research spans from women's mental health to feminism and gender analysis of psychiatry in Australia. She is also known for working against the abuse of children especially in religious institutions, the long-term sequelae of childhood sexual abuse, and psychiatric issues in domestic violence.

Apart from academic researches, Quadrio is a therapist, educator, advocate on injustice and ethical issues as well as boundary violations.

== Awards ==
Quadrio was appointed a Member of the Order of Australia in 2024 for her "significant service to psychiatry". In 2021, she received the Royal Australian and New Zealand College of Psychiatrists NSW Meritorious Service Award.

== Early career in psychiatry ==
Quadrio sought to change the dominant, masculine-centred paradigm in psychiatry. A perspective that pervaded the 1960s theories and methods of family therapy, in particular the Freudian model which saw children separated from parents during therapy sessions. Quadrio invited parents to sessions in order to understand their broader social context insisting females in therapy needed different considerations to males. Previously (and concurrently), clinicians "characterised male attributes as the norm and female attributes – like emotionalism – deviant behaviour, neurosis, so called", when assessing patients. Quadrio stated that discovering family therapy was critical to her professional development.

The marginalisation of women in psychiatry led to Quadrio's future research on female representation in her field. Following the 1988 Royal Australian and New Zealand College of Psychiatrists Annual Congress she publicly raised the issue by criticising the lack of female plenary speakers. At the 1990 Congress, Quadrio was invited to present Development, Gender and Psychotherapy; very few women in that 26-year history received that opportunity. Quadrio was the sole Australian presenter at the 20th Annual Congress of the European Association of Behavioural Therapists held in Paris, 1990. She was amongst the first scientific exchanges arranged by the Australia - France Endowment fund. During a civil rights protest outside the conference where placards referencing the violations of the rights of man, Quadrio, held up her own slogan in French "women also have rights".

== Posts held ==
- Director of Mental Health Services, Correctional Health Services, New South Wales (1998- 2001)
- Visiting Psychotherapy Supervisor, Prince of Wales Hospital, Department of Psychiatry (1990-1998)
- Deputy Medical Superintendent, Department of Psychiatry, Prince of Wales Hospital (1987-1989)
- Private Practice, Sydney, Australia (full-time1984-1986 and Part-time 1989-2024)

== Appointments ==
- Prior chairperson of the committee for Advanced Training in Psychotherapies, General Councillor, Fellowships board member and NSW Branch Committee member with the Royal Australian and New Zealand College of Psychiatrists (RANZCP).
- Advisory Panel, Blueknot: Empowering recovery from complex trauma (2024)
- Advisory Panel, International support and information for survivors of therapist abuse (1991-2022).
- Advisory Panel Adults Surviving Child Abuse (ASCA ), The Morris Center, U.S.A (2012- 2022).
- Professional Advisory Panel, Victims Services, Department of Justice, NSW (1988- 2021).
- Federal Councillor, RANZCP, Chairperson, Committee for Advanced Training in Psychotherapies (1998-2004).
- Regional Vice President (Australia), International Academy of Behavioural Medicine Counselling and Psychotherapy(1988-2001).
- Sexual Offenders Ministerial Advisory Group, Attorney Generals Office, New South Wales (1998- 2003).
- President, Editorial Board, Australian and New Zealand Journal of Family Therapy (1988–92) and recipient ANJFT Journal Award for Excellence (2013).
- Honorary Appointment, Ethics Committee, Australian Medical Association (1989–91)

== Teaching and Influence on education ==
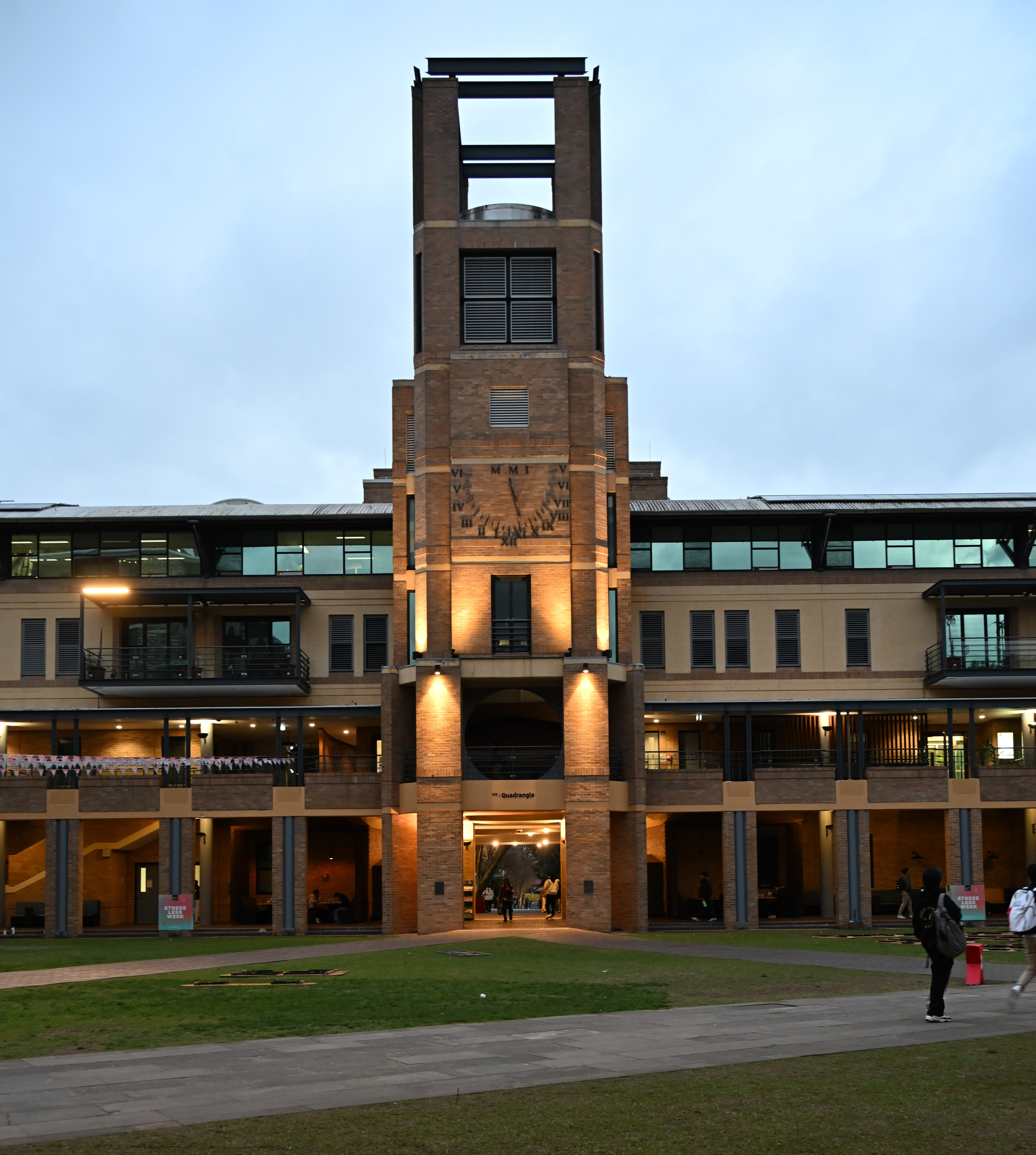
University of New South Wales.

Quadrio has taught across Sydney as a Senior Lecturer and Visiting Fellow on both psychotherapy and family therapy. She contributes locally and internationally in building family therapy knowledge base and practice.

- Senior Lecturer and Supervisor, NSW Institute of Psychiatry: Postgraduate Program in Psychiatry (1990-2021).
- Lecturer and Student Supervisor in Psychotherapy and Family Therapy at each of the five major teaching centres in Sydney: Westmead Children's, Royal North Shore Child and Family Unit, Prince of Wales and Royal Women's (Paddington) Hospitals; also Rivendell and Arndell Child and Adolescent Units (1990 -1998).
- Senior Lecturer, New South Wales Institute of Psychotherapy (1989-1997)
- Founder, Senior Lecturer in Psychiatry & Coordinator Post-graduate Psychotherapy Program, School of Psychiatry University of New South Wales faculty of Medicine and the Prince of Wales Hospital, Sydney (1988-1991)
- Senior Lecturer, Family Therapy Institute

In 2024 Quadrio continues teaching as an Adjunct Associate Professor for the School of Psychiatry in the Faculty of Medicine at the University of New South Wales.

== Publications ==
Quadrio has fifty-eight publications, cited 479 times with over 14,500 reads.

=== Books ===
- Women Working and Training in Australian Psychiatry (2001). Glebe, NSW: Bookhouse.

=== Chapters in books ===
- "Incest that continues into adult life" (2019). In: Benjamin, R., Haliburn, J., & King, S. Humanising Mental Health Care in Australia: A Guide to Trauma-Informed Approaches. Routledge.ISBN 9780429021923
- "Psychiatry and the Depressed Woman" (2010) in Hussin, I., (ed.), Women and Depression. Cambridge Scholars Publishing, Newcastle upon Tyne UK.
- "Criminalisation of Post-Therapeutic Relationships in Psychiatry and Psychotherapy" (1998). In: Smith, RG., Health Care, Crime and Regulatory Control. Sydney: Hawkins Press.
- "Three Generations of Greek Brides in Western Australia" (1994). In: Weddings and Wives. Spender, D., (ed), Penguin, Sydney.
- "Family Therapy: Clinical Aspects" (1991). In: Mental Health and Illness. Kosky, R., Eshkaviri, H., and Carr, V.,(eds), Butterworths, Australia.
- "The Mid-Life Transition for the Homemaker" (1990). In: Women and Health. Saltman, D., (ed), Harcourt Brace Jovanovich, Sydney.

=== Peer reviewed journals ===
- Peisah, C., Brodaty, H., & Quadrio, C. (2006). "Family Conflict in Dementia". International Journal of Geriatric Psychiatry, 21, 485–492.
- Quadrio, C. (2004). "A personal view of our history to 1988: Family therapy in Australia". Australian and New Zealand Journal of Family Therapy, 25, 64–67.
- Quadrio, C. (2004). "Boundary violations in psychotherapy". Psychotherapy in Australia, 10 (3), 28–37.
- Quadrio, C. (1998). "On psychiatry: Some reflections circa 1998". Australian and New Zealand Journal of Psychiatry, 32, 751–752.
- Quadrio, C. (1997). "Women and men and the medical workforce in Australia". Editorial, Medical Journal of Australia, 166, 7.
- Quadrio, C. (1996). "Sexual exploitation in therapy: Gender issues". Australian and New Zealand Journal of Psychiatry, 30, 124–133.
- Quadrio, C. (1996). "Contemporary cinematic representations of the female psychiatrist". Australian Feminist Studies, 23, 115–128.
- Quadrio, C. (1994). "Woman‐centred perspectives on female psychosexuality". Australian and New Zealand Journal of Psychiatry, 28, 478–487.
- Quadrio, C. (1994). "Do we need a psychology of gender difference?" Australian and New Zealand Journal of Family Therapy, 15 (4), 177–183.
- Quadrio, C. (1994). "Sexual abuse involving therapists, clergy and judiciary: Closed ranks, collusions and conspiracies of silence". Psychiatry, Psychology and Law, 1 (2), 189–198.
- Quadrio, C. (1992). "Sex and gender and the impaired therapist". Australian and New Zealand Journal of Psychiatry, 26, 346–363.
- Quadrio, C. (1991). "Women in Australian psychiatry: The fat lady sings". Australian and New Zealand Journal of Psychiatry, 25, 95–110.
- Quadrio, C. (1988). "Remedicalisation as regression in psychiatry". Australian and New Zealand Journal of Psychiatry, 22, 242–245.
- Quadrio C. and Levy, F. (1988). "Separation anxiety in over‐attached families". Australian and New Zealand Journal of Family Therapy, 9 (3), 123–130.
- Quadrio, C. (1987). "Family therapy: What are the basic assumptions?" Editorial comment. Australian and New Zealand Journal of Psychiatry, 21, 420–422.
- Quadrio, C. (1986). "The middle years, education update". Australian and New Zealand Journal of Family Therapy, 7 (1), 33–37.
- Quadrio, C. (1986). "Analysis and system: A marriage". Australian and New Zealand Journal of Psychiatry, 20, 219–224.
- Quadrio, C. (1986). "Individuation as a life process – the interface of intrapsychic and systems theories". Australian and New Zealand Journal of Family Therapy, 7 (4), 189–193.
- Quadrio, C. (1984). "Families of agoraphobic women". Australian and New Zealand Journal of Psychiatry, 18, 164–170.
- Quadrio, C. (1982). "Rapunzel and the pumpkin eater – A study of marital systems in agoraphobic women". Australian Journal of Family Therapy, 4 (2), 81–85.
- Quadrio, C. (1982). "The Peter Pan and Wendy syndrome – A marital dynamic". Australian and New Zealand Journal of Psychiatry, 16, 23–28.
- Quadrio, C. (1981). "Psychiatry and family law in Western Australia", Australian and New Zealand Journal of Psychiatry, 15, 19–22.
- Quadrio, C. (1981). "Schizophrenia and family therapy". Australian Journal of Family Therapy, 2 (3), 123–129.
