= Nitza Lowenstein =

Israeli-Australian radio presenter and journalist

- ניצה לוונשטיין
- Born: Nitza Vengosh; 1953 (age 72–73); Tel Aviv, Israel
- Education: University of the Witwatersrand; Macquarie University
- Occupations: Radio presenter, journalist
- Years active: 1988–2023
- Employer: SBS Radio (1988–2023)
- Spouse: Arthur Lowenstein
- Children: 3

Nitza Lowenstein (Hebrew: ניצה לוונשטיין; born 1953) is a retired Israeli-Australian radio broadcaster and producer. She is best known for presenting and producing radio shows for SBS Radio in both Modern Hebrew and English, from 1988 to 2023.

== Early life ==
Lowenstein was born and raised in Tel Aviv in Israel in 1953. Most of her childhood friends at that time were children of Holocaust survivors. She married her South African husband, Arthur Lowenstein, in a traditional Jewish ceremony in Johannesburg, where they lived. Lowenstein graduated with an MA in History & Literature in 1977 from the city's University of the Witwatersrand. She emigrated with her husband to Australia in the same year. They have three children together.

== Career ==
In 1984, she began working for Emanuel School, an independent Jewish Day School in Sydney, where she coordinated the Hebrew and Jewish Studies curriculum in the Infants School.

=== SBS ===
In March 1988, Lowenstein began producing and presenting radio programs for SBS Radio, a public service broadcaster in Australia with programmes in both Hebrew and English. During her 33.5 tenure she interviewed prominent global Jewish figures. In 1988 she interviewed Nobel laureate, and Holocaust survivor, Elie Wiesel. She also interviewed the Israeli writer A. B. Yehoshua in 1996. In 2005, she interviewed Fiddler on the Roof star, Chaim Topol. In 2016, she interviewed rabbi Shmuley Boteach.

She also interviewed key political figures from Israel, including prime ministers, Shimon Peres in 1994 and Benjamin Netanyahu in 1998. In 2016, she interviewed the Israeli Minister of Justice, Amir Ohana. In 2018, she interviewed Israeli president, Isaac Herzog, when he was head of the Jewish Agency.

In addition, she has interviewed prominent Jewish Australians such as Ronni Kahn, Alex Ryvchin and politician Josh Frydenberg. She has also interviewed local entertainment figures such as singer Lior.

She interviewed non-Jewish politician, Pauline Hanson in 1997.

She has also produced and presented special educational programmes on Jewish holidays such as Yom Kippur, Kol Nidrei, Hanukkah and Purim.

She has also produced special reports from Israel, such as when she was in the country during the 2022 Gaza–Israel clashes.

In 2019, Lowenstein recorded a tribute marking the life and work of the late Israeli writer, Amos Oz. She has also produced and broadcast specials marking key events in Israeli history, such as the Yom Kippur War.

== See also ==
- Israeli Australians
