= Sheree Rubinstein =

Founder of One Roof Women, empowering women in business

Sheree Rubinstein is a former corporate lawyer and founder of One Roof Women, a hub for women in business. She is an entrepreneur and advocate for women's advancement in business leadership.

== Career ==
Sheree graduated law school and was employed by one of Melbourne's top firms. Driven by an entrepreneurial spirit combined with a desire to foster social enterprise, Rubinstein decided to leave the confines of her 'top tier' law firm for advocacy for women in business.

=== Establishment of One Roof ===
In 2015, Rubinstein joined with US based strategist, Gianna Wurzl to found One Roof with bases in Melbourne and Los Angeles. The early iteration of the One Roof model looked at conversions of under-used physical spaces, to transform them into shared work spaces supporting women in business. The intent was to combine traditional support such as networking, events and workshops, and access to legal, finance, fundraising, and communications services, with less traditional support such as yoga and meditation classes.

While the Los Angeles and Sydney branches transformed into virtual networks, not using physical space, the Melbourne branch, run by Sheree Rubinstein experienced enormous growth. In April 2016, One Roof took over space in Southbank establishing dedicated office space as well as coworking space. One Roof estimates it has engaged 10,000 women, across four cities, and hosted over 500 workshops. Rubinstein continued her connection with the One Roof charity partner, SHE, run by Melbourne-based non-profit YGAP, which seeks to foster female entrepreneurs via its accelerator programmes in Kenya, South Africa and Australia in a bid to improve the lives of women and girls.

== Awards and grants ==
In recognition of One Roof's contribution to women in business, Rubinstein won the 2016 Victorian Young Achievers Leadership Award and was nominated as one of Australia's top young innovators by The Foundation for Young Australians. In 2015, Rubinstein won a $10,000 seed grant from BASF to drive innovation.

In October 2018 Rubinstein was named one of the Young Leaders in The Australian Financial Review 100 Women of Influence awards.

In 2022 Rubinstein was selected as a finalist in the 2022 Women’s Agenda Leadership Awards.
