= The Jewish Independent =

Australian publication

The Jewish Independent (TJI) is an Australian Jewish publication launched in 2024. Formerly known as Plus61J Media, the publication has served the Australian Jewish community since 2015.

== History ==
The rebrand was in response to the changes in global Jewish and media landscapes, to publish and facilitate news to a wider audience in various formats. Headquartered in Sydney, the platform produces independent news, opinions and multimedia content to analyze, inform, encourage debate and generate ideas about life from a Jewish perspective in Australia.

In 2020, to honor the legacy of Emeritus Professor Colin Tatz AO, a distinguished scholar and activist renowned for his work in combating racism and discrimination, Plus61J launched the Colin Tatz Oration. The annual event serves to recognize Tatz's work and reiterate his commitment to social justice for all Australians.

In September 2024, they partnered with the New Israel Fund (NIF) to host From International Courts: Assessing the Impacts of the Israel/Gaza War in Sydney, an event to discuss the roles of the International Court of Justice and International Criminal Court in the Israel-Gaza conflict, and the effects on Australia.

TJI also sponsored the inaugural The Young Jewish Writers Award in 2024. The award is part of the Shalom Australian Jewish Book Awards to recognize contemporary Jewish Australian writing, and the broader Sydney Jewish Writers Festival.

TJI has also been involved with and supported Limmud, the global Jewish education organization which began in 1980, since its first annual event outside of the UK in Sydney in 1999.

=== Media ===
As TJI, they launched the “Ashamed to Admit” podcast, in 2024.

In the same year, they produced the film "Pita with Vegemite: An Israeli Australian Story”, which premiered at the historic Ritz Cinema in Randwick, Sydney as part of the Jewish International Film Festival.

== Recognition and honours ==
Plus61J received the NSW Premier’s Multicultural Communications Award for Best Audio Visual Report in 2022 for their 3 part video series, “Covid Courage: Stories of Sydney Jewry”, and in 2023 for “From their Perspective: Palestinian Citizens of Israel”.

In Australia, TJI’s work and writers have been acknowledged by publications Neos Kosmos, and the Australian Jewish News. Outside of Australia, Plus61J and TJI articles and work have been referenced in global publications such as The Forward, and The Atlanta Jewish Times.
