= Australian and New Zealand Journal of Family Therapy =

Academic journal

- Discipline: Family therapy
- Language: English
- Edited by: Glenn Larner

Publication details
- Former name: Australian Journal of Family Therapy
- History: 1979-present
- Publisher: Wiley-Blackwell on behalf of the Australian Association of Family Therapy
- Frequency: Quarterly
- Impact factor: 0.575 (2017)

Standard abbreviations
- ISO 4: Aust. N. Z. J. Fam. Ther.

Indexing
- ISSN: 0814-723X (print); 1467-8438 (web)
- LCCN: 97660814
- OCLC no.: 782077753

Links
- Journal homepage; Online access; Online archive

The Australian and New Zealand Journal of Family Therapy (ANZJFT) is a quarterly peer-reviewed academic journal published by Wiley-Blackwell on behalf of the Australian Association of Family Therapy. The journal was established in 1979. Australian family therapist Moshe Lang was the journal's first president, from its founding until 1988. ANZJFT covers research related to family therapy, spanning subfields of psychology such as clinical psychology, therapy, counseling, and psychoanalysis.

== Abstract and indexing ==
The journal is abstracted or indexed in:

- CINAHL
- EBSCO databases
- ProQuest databases
- PsycINFO
- Scopus
- Social Sciences Citation Index

According to the Journal Citation Reports, the journal has a 2017 impact factor of 0.575, ranking it 37th out of 46 journals in the category "Family Studies" and 706th out of 774 journals in the category "Psychiatry/Psychology".
