= Nitzani =

Nitzani (Hebrew: ניצני) is a surname derived from the word Nitzan which means "bud". Notable people with the surname include:

- Ya'akov Nitzani (1900–1962), Israeli politician
- Yair Nitzani (born 1958), Israeli musician, songwriter, TV host and comedian
