= Alex Fein =

Activist, writer, businesswoman

Alex Fein is a community activist, writer and businesswoman, living in Melbourne, Australia. Since 2009, she has been a key player in Australian Jewish media. Her activism utilises multimedia tools, focusing on social justice, good epistemic practice in biomedical research and policy development, transparency, Orthodox Judaism and feminism.

== New media activism ==
Fein was an early adopter of various online channels in organising for social justice. Her blog, The Sensible Jew, was at the forefront of a campaign against homophobia in Australia's Jewish community, and she has since been an outspoken proponent of LGBTQI inclusion in organised Jewish communal life.

In 2013, she took over the editorship of online Jewish affairs magazine, Galus Australis. Here and elsewhere, Fein campaigned against the culture of cover up that emerged from the Royal Commission into institutional responses to child sexual abuse. Fein contended that there was a rabbinic culture inimical to transparency and the rule of law. Fein was also responsible for 'outing' federal politician, Michael Danby, who in the 2013 Federal Elections produced separate 'how to vote' cards which Fein contended pandered to Haredi prejudices.

Alex Fein is a founder of #ausPol Daily, initially positioned as "a non-partisan hub and resource dedicated to getting people & parties who believe in compassionate, evidence-based government elected".

== Feminism and Orthodox Judaism ==
The worldwide push to redress systemic discrimination against women in Orthodox Judaism became central to Fein's activism after her marriage to an Orthodox Rabbi in 2011. A long time feminist, she is an advocate of a systems approach to the religious community's pathologies, identifying the Haredi hegemony over the rabbinate and their attitudes towards sex and sexuality as common factors linking such issues as homophobia, the cover up of sexual abuse, and violence against women (including igun/gett refusal). She contends that there is space within authentic Orthodoxy for reconciling feminism and the rights of the individual. She is a firm believer in the need for Orthodox women to have the skills and capacities to lead their congregations.

== Interfaith work ==
In 2015 Fein, together with Bracha Rafael established an interfaith publication called, The Colony. It formed a launchpad for Fein's activism against Islamophobia.

== Macroscope ==
Fein founded Macroscope, a communications and product development company specialising in biomedical research counter-disinformation.

== Judy Wilyman incident ==
Following The University of Wollongong's conferring a PhD on Judy Wilyman for a thesis skeptical of vaccination, Fein opened a change.org petition calling on the Department of Education and Training to take disciplinary action against the university. The petition was unsuccessful.

== Controversies ==
Fein has strongly condemned what she perceives as a corrupted organisational and philanthropic culture in Jewish Australia. Her own philanthropic activity has been unconventional, and her opposition to establishment practices has been criticised as simplistic and naive. In one article, a conservative community activist whom she had criticised accused her of an 'evidence-light prosecutorial indictment of the community.' Fein responded to this criticism by saying that it was this very style of argument that was driving away an entire generation of young Jews.

These debates have been recorded and analysed in the wider Australian media and in scholarly work conducted by Monash University.
