= Avril Alba =

Australian theologian and historian (born 1970)

- Born: 20 May 1970 (age 56); Adelaide, Australia

Academic background
- Education: University of Sydney
- Thesis: Redeeming the Holocaust: uncovering the sacred narratives of the secular museum (2011)

Avril Alba (born 20 May 1970) is an Australian professor of Holocaust studies and Jewish civilization at the University of Sydney.

== Biography ==
Alba was born 20 May 1970 in Adelaide to Solomon Alba and Shirley Alba.

During 2002 to 2011, Alba worked as the education director of the Sydney Jewish Museum.

In 2011, Alba received her PhD in history from the University of Sydney. Alba's thesis Redeeming the Holocaust: uncovering the sacred narratives of the secular museum, examined the museum as a sacred space. In 2015, Alba published The Holocaust Memorial Museum: Sacred Secular Space.

Through the Australian Research Council, Alba has conducted research on the impact of Holocaust museum education during 2014 to 2017, and on the memory of the Holocaust in Australia from 2019 to 2025.

== Publications ==
- Alba, Avril (2015). The Holocaust Memorial Museum: Sacred Secular Space. Basingstoke: Palgrave Macmillan. ISBN 9781137451354.
