= Secular Jew =

Secular Jew may refer to:

- A general epithet for Jews who participate in modern secular society and are not stringently religious
- Nonreligious Jews:
  - Jewish atheism
  - List of Jewish atheists and agnostics
- Hiloni ("secular") a social category in Israel designating nonobservant Jews
- Jewish secularism, secular definition of Jewish collective existence
- Secular Zionism, a form of Zionism based on Jewish national identity rather than religious belief
