= Dvora Waysman =

Australian-Israeli author

Dvora Waysman (Hebrew: דבורה וייזמן) is an Australian-Israeli author. Born Dorothy Opas in Melbourne, Victoria, Waysman made Aliyah to Israel in 1971 with her husband and four children. She is a prolific writer, with her works syndicated worldwide in over 20 publications, and is a regular contributor to The Jewish Press, where she writes on topics including travel, family life, and Jewish holidays, often drawing from her knowledge of Jewish history.

== Biography ==
Dorothy Opas (later Dvora Waysman) was born in Melbourne, Victoria. She made aliyah to Israel in 1971 with her husband and four children. The family settled in Jerusalem.

Her writings are syndicated worldwide in over 20 publications. Waysman is a contributor to The Jewish Press. Her topics include travel-related, family life experiences and Jewish holidays. Examples from her knowledge of Jewish History are often part of what she writes. Waysman has taught creative writing and journalism for three decades.

Waysman's novel The Pomegranate Pendant was made into a movie in 2009. It premiered at the Jerusalem Film Festival in 2012.

== Awards and recognition ==
Waysman was the 1981 recipient of the "For Jerusalem" citation for her fiction, poems and features about the city of Jerusalem, and has won the Seeff Award for Best Foreign Correspondent in 1988. In 2014, the movie based on her book, The Golden Pomegranate, won the Shabazi Prize for Literature and Art.

== Published works ==
=== Books ===
- In A Good Pasture, ISBN 965-7344-58-1, Mazo Publishers, Nov. 2008
- Seeds Of The Pomegranate, ISBN 965-7344-20-4, Mazo Publishers
- The Pomegranate Pendant, ISBN 965-7344-21-2, Mazo Publishers, Jan. 2007
- Esther, A Jerusalem Love Story, ISBN 1-55874-822-9, Health Communications
- Jewish Detective Stories For Kids
- My Jewish Days of the Week, Hachai Publishing. Artwork by Melanie Schmidt.

=== Short stories ===
- "Dorothy's Diary"
