= Hajnal Ban =

Australian lawyer, author, and politician (born 1977)

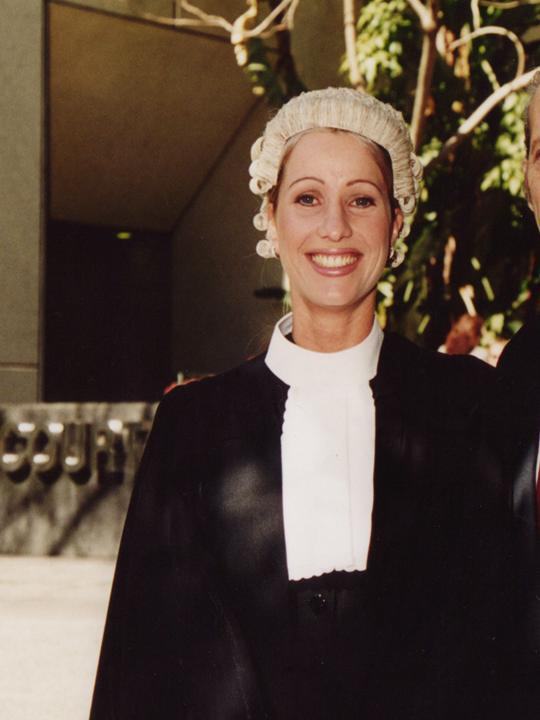
- Born: Hajnal Ban; 3 November 1977 (age 49); Afula, Israel
- Citizenship: Australian
- Education: BIntBus, LLB
- Alma mater: Griffith University
- Occupations: Barrister, author, politician
- Spouse: Sean Black (2010 - 2012)
- Children: Dominic, Elijah (step-children)
- Writing career
- Pen name: Sara Vornamen
- Notable works: God Made Me Small, Surgery Made Me Tall
- Website: hajnalban.com

Hajnal Ban (also known as Hajnal Black) is an Australian lawyer, author, and former conservative politician, who was convicted of charges that prevented her being elected to public office between 2012 and 2016.

She was elected on 15 March 2008 a councillor for Logan City but was disqualified from 27 March 2012. Previously she was a councillor for the (now defunct) Beaudesert Shire Council from 27 March 2004. She was an unsuccessful National Party candidate for the federal seat of Forde, south of Brisbane, at the 2007 federal election. She won Liberal National Party selection for the newly created federal seat of Wright in November 2009, but subsequently lost endorsement following allegations she mismanaged the funds of a 65-year-old man.

In 2002, she underwent surgery to increase the length of each of her legs by 8 cm. She published her experiences in the book God Made Me Small, Surgery Made Me Tall under the pseudonym Sara Vornamen. She also released a book called Her Secret.

== Early life ==
Ban was born in Afula, Israel, to Hungarian parents. Ban's grandfather was an Eastern European Jewish Holocaust survivor who moved the family to Israel in 1976 to escape communism. The family moved to Austria in 1980 and then immigrated to Logan City, south of Brisbane, Australia in 1983. On gaining pre-selection for a federal seat, Ban relinquished her Israeli citizenship as Section 44 of the Australian Constitution forbids the election of people holding dual citizenship.

== Education ==
Ban was educated at Marsden Primary School and then Marsden State High School in Logan City, graduating in 1995.

After high school she entered Griffith University's law school and obtained degrees in Law and International Business. Ban was then admitted as a Barrister-at-Law in 2001.

== Political career ==
=== 2004–2008, Shire of Beaudesert Council ===
Ban was first elected as Councillor for Division 4 in the (now defunct) Shire of Beaudesert on 27 March 2004 at the age of 26, when she significantly out-polled her four male opponents. She was the youngest-ever councillor to be elected in the shire and the only barrister. She was elected as an independent and had no previous political party affiliation, but joined the National Party in 2006.

She was chairperson of the Shire's Planning and Development Committee from April 2004 to December 2005, when she was removed from the post, in a move spearheaded by Councillor John Fronis, over her opposition to the State's decision to designate the North McLean Enterprise Precinct in the South East Queensland Regional Plan, which would have placed heavy industry in the middle of her rural-residential division.

=== 2007 federal election ===
In the 2007 federal election, Ban stood as the National Party candidate for the seat of Forde. Although she worked hard at her campaign and was credited with achieving a larger than expected swing, Ban only achieved 12.2% of the primary vote. The voter base in the Forde electorate is heavily urban, so it was always unlikely the electorate would have voted for a National Party candidate over its urban conservative sister party, the Liberals.

=== 2008 local government elections ===
In July 2007, the Queensland Labor Government announced widespread reform to local government. The major reform was to amalgamate many councils, and Beaudesert was included in the process. Half the Shire was amalgamated with the Shire of Boonah to create the Scenic Rim Region while the other half was amalgamated with Logan City. Ban's entire division was in the area to be amalgamated into Logan City. Her division underwent significant change when it was merged with the neighbouring Division 5 (held by John Fronis, a Labor councillor) to form the new Logan City Division 11. Fronis and Ban subsequently contested the new division at the March 2008 elections, with Ban winning convincingly, even in areas where the Labor vote at state and federal elections had historically been high. Ban achieved 66.06% of the two-candidate-preferred vote to Fronis' 33.94%.

=== Post–2008 election ===
After her election to Logan City Council, Ban was elected chairperson of the Community, Sport and Customer Services Committee, but was removed from the position in May 2009, and replaced by a neighbouring urban-based councillor, Phil Pidgeon, because of her strong and somewhat outspoken advocacy for the amalgamated areas she represents.

In late 2008, Ban formed an alliance with Sean Black, the only other rural-based councillor, and together they advocated strongly for their similar constituencies. Ban and Black married in 2010.

=== 2010 LNP candidacy for Division of Wright ===
After questions were raised by Queensland’s Adult Guardian about Ban's administration of an elderly man’s estate, the Liberal National Party revoked its endorsement of her as the candidate for the federal division of Wright on 7 June 2010. The LNP claimed the Adult Guardian’s questions were never disclosed in her vetting committee. Ban voluntarily surrendered her power of attorney on 2 July 2010, after which proceedings in the Queensland Civil and Administrative Tribunal were ceased.

Ban claimed the LNP disendorsed her pre-selection because men in the LNP hierarchy were never comfortable with a woman being pre-selected in a winnable seat.

=== 2012 Logan City Council election ===
Ban originally nominated to run again as councillor for Division 11, but several weeks prior to the election she withdrew from the contest.

=== Policies on gaming machines ===
Ban is an anti-pokies campaigner and continues to advocate for the reduction in the number of gaming machines within the Logan City local government area. Ban voted in several ballots to remove Deputy Mayor of Logan, Russell Lutton, who is a pro-pokies councillor. Lutton has since fought back criticising Ban.

== Criminal charges ==
In November 2011, Ban (then known as Hajnal Black) faced criminal charges for allegedly breaching local government financial disclosure laws. In December 2011, a Brisbane judge found she had failed to act properly on behalf of a dementia patient after the sale of his Park Ridge property south of Brisbane. The funds from the sale had been transferred into Ban's own bank account instead of being held in a separate trust account. Ban lodged an appeal against the decision of the Supreme Court in January 2012. In March 2012, she had two warrants issued for her arrest, for ignoring one court date and storming out of another. On 27 March 2012 she was found guilty on four of the five charges, fined $3500 and ordered to pay costs of $5000, and had a conviction recorded. In September 2012 the judge ruled she was only entitled to $40,000 of the $700,000 she took.

== Personal life ==
Ban was mentored by Brisbane barrister and businessman Russell Tacon. On 30 May 2010, Ban married Logan City Councillor Sean Black, who had acted as her campaign manager. She was known as Hajnal Black until they separated in mid-2012.

In 2002 Ban undertook radical cosmetic surgery to gain 8 cm of height. She travelled to the Russian Ilizarov Scientific Center for Restorative Traumatology and Orthopaedics in Kurgan, Russia where she was operated on by Dr Constantine Novikov. Over a period of 5 months Ban was bedridden as her legs were lengthened. The process of lengthening took 12 months. She returned to Australia and talked to the media about her operation under the pseudonym Sara Vornamen in an attempt to hide her identity. Under the name 'Sara Vornamen' Ban wrote a book about her surgery, God Made Me Small, Surgery Made Me Tall.

Brisbane's Courier-Mail revealed in April 2009 that Sara Vornamen was actually Ban. Since that time Ban has received worldwide attention for her surgery and has been a commentator on issues from sex discrimination to extra airline charges.

== See also ==
- List of Australian fraudsters
