= Australian Jewish Democratic Society =

- Abbreviation: AJDS
- Formation: 1984
- Headquarters: Melbourne
- Website: www.ajds.org.au

The Australian Jewish Democratic Society (AJDS), a secular organisation, was formed in Melbourne, Australia, in 1984 to promote free discussion and action on Jewish and general social and political issues. It grew out of a profound concern at the continuing Arab–Israeli conflict, though some of its members had been active on the left since at least the 1930s in Europe. Others had been born in Israel or Australia, or spent considerable time in Israel. Others came out of the anti-Vietnam war and peace movements. Some key members had strong links to the Israeli peace movement, the Jewish left, Labor Zionism, or other Jewish religious and cultural traditions. More recently, members with strong environmental concerns have become active.

There had been a number of predecessor organisations in the past, though these had been strongly stigmatised in the McCarthyite atmosphere of the 1950s, when communal leadership in those years took an increasingly hard line on the Israel-Palestine issue.

After the 1967 Six-Day War, the sharp decline in right-wing anti-Semitism, the rise of left-wing anti-Zionism, and the increased affluence of the community all tended to confirm and reinforce a Jewish move to the political right in a similar fashion to what occurred in other countries. At the same time, a small number of groups arose, including the Sydney Jewish Left and Salaam-Shalom in Sydney, Jewish Radical Association, Paths to Peace, and Australian Friends of Peace Now.

In 1984, AJDS established itself as "A progressive voice among Jews" and "A Jewish voice among progressives", and alongside public fora and debates, also hosted a radio program on the community radio station 3CR, despite opposition from Maoists and others. In the late 1980s, over 550 people signed a public advertisement AJDS placed an advertisement in The Jerusalem Post saying that many Australian Jews rejected Israel's refusal to negotiate land for peace. In August 1989, AJDS issued a 12-page pamphlet titled A Case for Israel's Future.

Despite its clear attachment and concern for the future of Israel it was claimed that 'AJDS members [are] not grounded in Jewish life, coming to their analysis of events from outside. Thus ... they seem unable to grasp the transcendental attachment Jews outside Israel have towards the Jewish State'. (Sam Lipski, Australian Jewish Times, 16 July 1987) This is despite the fact that much of what AJDS stands for is familiar to the Israeli left. Such statements are characteristic of attacks on Jewish critics of Israel, including those who belong to the 'pro-Israel' camp, including the strongly Zionist, but critical J Street lobby in the US.

== Activity ==
AJDS takes an active role in presenting an alternative viewpoint within the Australian Jewish community and to the community at large. It has taken positions opposing the Blockade of the Gaza Strip and the Occupation, including settlements, and is outspoken in support of civil rights in Israel and the occupied territories. However, it has made clear that its opposition is not to the state of Israel, but to the politics of successive Israeli governments, the settler movement, as well as the move to extremism in Palestinian organisations.

During the Gulf War, it argued in favour of the military removal of Iraqi forces from Kuwait. AJDS launched a petition, calling on Australians of different viewpoints to oppose any local manifestations of racism or ethnic or religious discrimination linked to the Middle East crisis. Following the conclusion of the Gulf War, AJDS renewed its call for political negotiations and mutual recognition between Israel and the Palestinians leading to the satisfaction of both Israeli security requirements and Palestinian national rights.

In 1997, AJDS called on the Israeli Government to accept territorial compromise, and to recognise the right of the Palestinians to a State of their own and more recently, has strongly opposed the actions in Gaza, Lebanon and elsewhere. On 1 June 2010, it issued a strong statement against Israeli actions in the 2010 Gaza flotilla raid, calling it an act of terror and saying that "Unless the Israeli government can convincingly back up its claims that the Gaza aid convoy was not a project for delivering humanitarian aid to Gaza, but in reality a front for violent action, it invites the condemnation of everyone who supports negotiated conflict resolution and reinforces the view that Israel's professed support for human rights is a sham."

In addition to frequently expressing views on the Israeli-Palestinian conflict, the AJDS also promotes cooperation with broader social groups on a range of issues.

As part of its platform, the organisation has stated that "We in AJDS believe that in a genuinely multicultural society like Australia, Jews should be concerned with Indigenous rights and the rights of other minorities. We have all complained at some time about the indifference of the world to the plight of the Jewish people at their most horrific period in human history. Neither can we then ignore the plight of other minorities".

Despite a vociferous campaign against its right to representation, in the 1990s, the AJDS succeeded in become an affiliate of the Jewish Community Council of Victoria.

== Platform ==
The organisation has traditionally attempted to work with the following value, that it works with and represents

- A pluralistic Jewish community, by encouraging contributions from a wide range of viewpoints and perspectives
- A Judaism that grants equality of expression and participation to all streams of Jewish thought.
- The traditional Jewish concept of Tikkun Olam: "Heal, repair, and transform the world"
- A specifically Jewish approach to the issues of Peace and Social Justice.
- Recognition of the rights of Palestinians and Israelis to live in peace in their own lands
- Jewish concerns with the continuing struggle against all expressions of racism
- The interrelationship of the Jewish community with the rest of Australian society.

Most recently, the organisation has stated its objectives "to be a legitimate and responsible progressive Jewish voice raising awareness amongst policy and decision makers, political parties, social media, progressive Palestinian organisations, and thinking Jews about our three core issues – climate change, the middle east and social justice."

== Resolution on limited boycotts ==
On 8 August 2010, the AJDS became the first Australian community-affiliated Jewish organisation to adopt the view that some boycotts of Israel may indeed be justified. Unlike the BDS position on Israel, the AJDS wants to concentrate on those who profit from the occupation. The decision culminated a 16-month process of discussion and expression of a wide range of views in its Newsletter.

The resolution thus rejected the Palestinian civil society version of Boycotts, Divestments and Sanctions (BDS): "The AJDS is opposed to any Boycotts, Divestment and Sanctions (BDS) campaign aimed at the breadth of Israeli economic, cultural or intellectual activity". The AJDS only supports "selected BDS actions designed to bring about an end to the Israeli occupation, blockade and settlement on Palestinian lands lying outside of the June 1967 Israeli borders."

While not reversing the AJDS's long-term opposition to blanket academic boycotts, the AJDS envisaged boycotting "specific Israeli academics openly supportive of the Occupation." The organisation made it plain that nevertheless decision on any action would still need to be taken on a case-by-case basis.

== Settlements products and the Occupation ==
In early 2013, AJDS also launched a Don't Buy Settlements Products campaign. In response to hostile statements from the Jewish Community Council of Victoria, the AJDS issued a statement in which it said that "The JCCV, as the roof body of the Jewish community in Victoria, must recognise that our community is large and complex. There are innumerable different versions of Jewishness, Judaism, and relationships to Israel contained within it. It is not the role of the JCCV, or the different affiliates, to police what is an acceptable expression of Jewishness or Zionism. The JCCV should be focused on fostering an open, inclusive and dynamic Jewish community. Disaffiliating, or sanctioning, the AJDS would be a step in the wrong direction for a diverse, and politically pluralistic Victorian Jewish community, and for Jewish communities around the world."

In 2024, AJDS noted that "In 2010 the AJDS adopted a resolution which supported limited boycotts and services to hold Israel accountable for its occupation. This included selected actions designed to bring about an end to the Israeli occupation, blockade and settlement on Palestinian lands lying outside of the June 1967 Israeli borders." Further, in 2021, it stated to the Australian Department of Foreign Affairs that "Neither the Australian government nor any company or charity in Australia should be engaged in any trade or investment with Israel in the Occupied Territories". In line with this, it has voiced its opposition to military contracts with Elbit.

AJDS also supports selective sanctions against Israeli individuals and organisations which violate human rights. At the same time, AJDS notes that "any relationship between Australian and Palestinian entities such as the Palestinian Authority should also be subject to a similar human rights assessment with respect to military, security, intelligence, and related services, and be subject to sanction if necessary".

== Statement in support of the State of Palestine ==
On 15 May 2011, an op-ed from the AJDS was published in leading Australian newspapers including the Melbourne Age and the Sydney Morning Herald. The article urged the Australian government to support a resolution in favour of the establishment of the state of Palestine at the UN General Assembly in September 2011.

== The Occupation and Gaza War ==
AJDS has continued its longstanding opposition to the Occupation and also spoken out against the conduct of the Gaza War since October 7, 2023. While critical of the Hamas attack, it has opposed the disproportionate violence since then. In a letter to the Australian Foreign Minister in March 2024, it was said that "The AJDS affirms its condemnation of Hamas for its attack on Israel. The slaughter of civilians and hostage-taking, including many foreign workers, are war crimes. However, the situation has gone from bad to worse with Israel’s disproportionate response which has resulted in a seemingly irresolvable quagmire. We believe that we represent the views held by a significant and growing number of Australian Jews who are appalled by the policies of the Israeli government and who feel the peak Jewish bodies (such as ECAJ) do not speak for them."

It has supported the submission of South Africa's case to the International Court of Justice. The AJDS "believes that the complaint is sufficiently serious to be adjudicated according to principles of International Law". It has also urged Australia to "facilitate a negotiated settlement to the Israel/Palestine conflict through the recognition of Palestine".

== Antisemitism in Australia ==
It has actively spoken out against right wing and left wing extremism since the Gaza War. Thus, in a statement of Statement, 31 January, 2025, AJDS has said "Antisemitism, Islamophobia, homophobia—openly accepted hatred against one group will only embolden others.As a Jewish organisation based in Victoria, it is clear to us that fighting the rise of antisemitism is not a partisan political issue—it affects us all. We must foster strong relationships within our communities, and engage meaningfully to stop the rise of hate.

== Parliamentary Submissions ==
AJDS has been active in opposing the imposition of IHRA guidelines on Australian universities and has made its case in a number of submissions to different Parliamentary Inquiries.

It has also made submissions to the Australian Parliament on right-wing extremism and the outlawing of certain symbols .

== Social Justice and Indigenous Rights ==
AJDS actively campaigned for the Voice, a proposed Australian federal advisory body to comprise Aboriginal and Torres Strait Islander people in 2023, though the Referendum was defeated.
