= The Australian Jewish News =

Australian Jewish weekly newspaper

- First page of first issue of The Hebrew Standard of Australasia, 1 November 1895
- Type: Weekly newspaper
- Founded: November 1, 1895; 130 years ago
- Website: www.australianjewishnews.com

The Australian Jewish News (AJN) is a newspaper published in Darlinghurst, Sydney, New South Wales, Australia. Since 2019, it has been a local partner of The Times of Israel.

== History ==
The AJN is descended from The Hebrew Standard of Australasia, which was first published on 1 November 1895 in Sydney by founding editor Alfred Harris. In 1953, John Shaiak purchased the newspaper and changed its name to The Australian Jewish Times (AJT). In 1987, Richard Pratt bought the AJT and merged it with the Melbourne-based Australian Jewish News. From 1990, the newspaper has been published weekly nationally as The Australian Jewish News.

The newspaper celebrated its 100th anniversary in 1995 and launched an online edition in 2001. In July 2007, Robert Magid became the paper's new publisher.

In October 2019, the AJN became the seventh "local partner" of The Times of Israel. It is only the second local partner outside the United States, after the UK's Jewish News. The newspaper's digital presence is now integrated with The Times of Israel and the other local partners.

The paper played a role in backing Abraham Accords relations between Arab countries and Israel, regularly featuring pro-Israel Arab figures such as Emirati influencer Amjad Taha.

== Digitisation ==
The Hebrew Standard of Australasia has been digitised from 1895 to 1953 and is available online through Trove via the National Library of Australia. The Australian Jewish News (Melbourne Edition) has been digitized from 1935 to 1999 and is available through Trove via the National Library of Australia. The Australian Jewish News (Melbourne Edition) has been digitized from 2000 to 2020 and is available through Trove via the National Library of Australia.
