= Anglo-Israelis =

English-speaking Israeli Jewish cultural group

Anglo-Saksonim
אנגלו-סקסונים
- Mickey Marcus, an American WWII veteran and first Israeli general.

Languages
- Varieties of English, Hebrew, Yiddish

Religion
- Judaism

Related ethnic groups
- Other Israeli Jews, American Jews, British Jews, Canadian Jews, South African Jews, Australian Jews, Indian Jews, and other Anglophone Jewish populations.

Anglo-Israelis, also referred to as Anglo-Saksonim (Hebrew: אנגלו-סקסונים)(also "Anglo-Saksim" "אנגלו-סקסים") or English-speaking Israelis, are Anglophone Jewish olim and their descendants in the State of Israel. An integral part of Israeli Jewish society, they have imported into Israel the customs of their countries of origin.

Anglo-Israelis can generally be defined as coming from the United States, Canada, the United Kingdom, Australia, New Zealand, and South Africa.

== Etymology ==
The term "Anglo-Saksonim" is not an ethnic term in Israel, but rather a cultural and linguistic term for diaspora Jews whose first language is English and who grew up in a country within the Anglosphere. The name derives from the Anglo-Saxons who were the precursor population to the modern English people.

== History ==
Jews have existed in the English-speaking world since the Middle Ages when Jewish merchants from Normandy arrived in England in 1070. Though in 1290, they were expelled from England under the Edict of Expulsion proclaimed by King Edward I of England.

During the Israeli War of Independence in 1948, the 7th Armored Brigade became known as the "Anglo-Saxon Brigade", due to its heavy amount of Anglo-Israeli soldiers. Following the establishment of the State of Israel, a large amount of American Jews made aliyah to live in the new state. Initially English was retained as an official language in Israel, inherited from the British Mandate. However, the Law and Administration Ordinance of 1948 removed mention of English as an official language, with the removal being affirmed in a 1999 High Court of Justice case, which ruled "Any provision in the law requiring the use of the English language is repealed."

After the Six-Day War in 1967, many new Anglo-Israelis immigrated from America with left-leaning social views and were viewed to have had a greater influence on Israeli legislation than their number would indicate. However by the 21st century, Anglo-Israeli politics had largely turned right-leaning due to prioritising support of Israel's Jewish identity. In the 2020s, there had been moves for greater Anglo-Israeli representation politically. Despite this, there has never been an Anglo-Israeli party elected to the Knesset, nor has there ever been an Anglo-Israeli government minister. By 2021, it was estimated there were around 350,000 Anglo-Israelis in Israel.

== See also ==
- Moses Montefiore
- Jewish English varieties
- Yiddish words used in English
- Spanish-Portuguese Jews in the United States
