= Royal Commission on Antisemitism and Social Cohesion =

Australian Royal Commission

- Commissioner: The Hon. Virginia Bell AC
- Inquiry period: 9 January 2026 –
- Constituting instrument: Royal Commissions Act 1902 (Cth)
- Website: asc.royalcommission.gov.au

The Royal Commission on Antisemitism and Social Cohesion is a royal commission established on 9 January 2026 by the Australian government pursuant to the Royal Commissions Act 1902. The Commissioner, Virginia Bell, is due to report by 14 December 2026. An interim report was released on 30 April 2026 and made 14 recommendations to strengthen counterterrorism responses.

== Background ==
On 14 December 2025, an Islamic State (ISIS)-inspired terrorist attack occurred at Bondi Beach in Sydney, Australia, during a celebration of the Jewish holiday of Hanukkah (sometimes spelled, Chanukah) attended by approximately 1,000 people. Fifteen people were killed; forty people, including at least two police officers, were injured. Four homemade bombs were thrown into the crowd but failed to detonate; and another homemade bomb was found in a car belonging to one of the shooters. Numerous world leaders, news outlets and Australian authorities declared that the shooting was motivated by antisemitism. Prime minister Anthony Albanese said the shooting was "deliberately targeted at the Jewish community on the first day of Chanukah". He later said that more could have been done to prevent the attack, and that he accepts his share of responsibility as the prime minister.

One of the gunmen was shot dead by a New South Wales Police officer; the other was injured and arrested. He was subsequently charged and is to face the Australian criminal justice system. He was known to intelligence officials since 2019 but was deemed "not an immediate threat".

On the night of the attack, the NSW police commissioner Mal Lanyon declared the attack a terrorist incident. Australian intelligence officials said one of the offenders was known to them. On 16 December, the Australian Federal Police Commissioner Krissy Barrett said that "Early indications point to a terrorist attack inspired by Islamic State". Motivations were described by official sources as rooted in antisemitism, anti-Zionism, and the ideology of the Islamic State, but appeared to fit the profile of "lone wolf" attackers. Police said both gunmen had pledged allegiance to ISIS, and two ISIS flags were found in their car. According to police reports, documents allege the gunmen planned the attack months ahead. Initial investigations revealed that one of the accused was a past associate of radical Islamic preacher William Haddad who violated Australia's racial hatred laws.

The shooting exacerbated older ethnic, cultural, and religious tensions in the community, including the 2005 Cronulla riots, gun laws, immigration, and hate speech. Since the outbreak of the Gaza war, antisemitic attacks and other incidents surged in Australia. There was rising concern in the Jewish community and beyond that the Albanese government had not done enough to address antisemitism, most notably after the mass doxxing incident, the Melbourne synagogue attack in 2024; and other incidents across Australia. Additionally, the Albanese government had not responded to all the recommendations in a report delivered in July 2025 by the special envoy to combat antisemitism, Jillian Segal. NSW Police and security agencies were criticised following media reports that the Jewish community had requested a stronger police presence than what was ultimately deployed for the event.

In response to the Bondi Beach shooting, Albanese advocated stricter gun laws and a gun buyback program was announced. On 18 December, Albanese stated that, in response to the Segal report, the government would take action on all the report's recommendations. The same day, the Albanese government announced the strengthening of hate speech laws, the Minister for Home Affairs received new powers to cancel or reject visas of hate preachers, and a task force to ensure that the education system counters antisemitism was announced.

In her response to the Bondi Beach shooting, Australian opposition leader Sussan Ley initially focused on national security and counterterrorism, calling for the immediate formation of an antisemitism and counter-terrorism task force; and by 22 December, Ley called on the Albanese government to establish a royal commission, outlining proposed terms of reference. On 29 December, relatives of eleven of the victims of the Bondi attack appealed to the prime minister for a royal commission; and were supported by Jewish leaders, including Josh Frydenberg, a former Liberal politician who is Jewish, senior Australian barristers and lawyers, former Labor politicians, Australia's Human Rights Commissioner, prominent business leaders, former governors-general, defence and intelligence chiefs, and sportspeople.

On 21 December 2025, Prime Minister Albanese announced an independent federal review into Australia's federal law enforcement and intelligence agencies that was to be led by Dennis Richardson, a former intelligence head. The Albanese government initially ruled out holding a federal royal commission, with home affairs minister Tony Burke saying that it was not the best format to address issues of national security.

=== Announcement ===
On 8 January 2026 Prime Minister Albanese announced that the Royal Commission on Antisemitism and Social Cohesion would be established. The following day letters patent were issued. The Royal Commission is to issue an interim report by 30 April, and a final report by 14 December 2026. The NSW Government, who had earlier announced its own state royal commission, abandoned its plans and premier Chris Minns stated that NSW agencies would assist the federal royal commission.

Justice Virginia Bell was appointed as the sole Commissioner. Bell, a former Justice of the High Court of Australia, the highest court in the Australian court hierarchy, served on the High Court from February 2009 until her retirement on 28 February 2021. Bell had previously served in the Supreme Court of New South Wales and the New South Wales Court of Appeal, and was a counsel in the Wood Royal Commission.

Some members of the Jewish community expressed concerns over the appointment of Bell as commissioner, citing past judicial rulings that helped overturn anti-protest laws. However, the Law Council of Australia expressed appreciation for her appointment, and stated that she was "an eminent Australian jurist", and that "the conduct of royal commissions are governed by clear and well-established legal principles… In Australia, judges decide matters impartially and independently, by applying the law to the evidence before them. They do not act on personal views, political considerations, or public pressure". The Attorney-General Michelle Rowland stated that "… [Bell's] experience speaks for itself".

On 29 January 2026, Richard Lancaster SC was appointed as senior counsel assisting the royal commission.

== Terms of reference ==
The terms of reference outlined in the letters patent issued on 9 January 2026 require the Commissioner to examine:

- Tackling antisemitism.
- Making any recommendations to assist law enforcement, border control, immigration and security agencies to tackle antisemitism.
- Examine the circumstances surrounding the antisemitic Bondi terrorist attack on 14 December 2025.
- Make any other recommendations that would contribute to strengthening social cohesion in Australia and countering the spread of ideologically and religiously motivated extremism in Australia.
- Any matter reasonably incidental to a matter referred to in paragraphs [above].

== Powers ==
The powers of royal commissions in Australia are set out in the enabling legislation, the Royal Commissions Act 1902.

Royal commissions have powers to issue a summons to a person to appear before the commission at a hearing to give evidence or to produce documents specified in the summons; require witnesses to take an oath or give an affirmation; and require a person to deliver documents to the commission at a specified place and time. A person served with a summons or a notice to produce documents must comply with that requirement, or face prosecution for an offence. The penalty for conviction upon such an offence is a fine of A$1,000 or six months imprisonment. A Royal Commission may authorise the Australian Federal Police to execute search warrants.

State Letters Patent

In support of the Royal Commission, on 20 January 2026 the Governor of Western Australia issued a Commission under the Royal Commissions Act 1968 (WA); and on 21 January 2026 the Governor of New South Wales issued Letters Patent under the Royal Commissions Act 1923 (NSW).

== Public hearings ==
The hearing opened on 24 February 2026. Bell intends to deliver her final report before the first anniversary of the attack. She will not hear evidence from eyewitnesses, who may be required to provide evidence at forthcoming criminal trials. The Royal Commission received over 7,400 submissions, with three blocks of hearings scheduled for 2026. A "significant number" of submissions detailed lived experiences of antisemitism across education, employment, media, health, the arts, sports, and online environments.

The Commission adopted the definition of antisemitism used by the International Holocaust Remembrance Alliance as its working definition, to be applied on a case-by-case basis to assess whether incidents and experiences described in testimony constitute antisemitism. Commissioner Bell indicated the definition would be used as a guide rather than a rigid test.

Counsel Assisting the commission, Zelie Heger SC, told the inquiry in her opening address that the Hamas October 7 attacks represented "a significant turning point for antisemitism in Australia", and that the Executive Council of Australian Jewry had recorded 2,062 antisemitic incidents between October 2023 and September 2024, a threefold increase on the prior year.

=== Hearing block 1 (4–15 May 2026) ===
The Royal Commissioner Bell began hearing from witnesses on 4 May in Sydney. The first block of hearings focused on defining antisemitism and assessing its prevalence in Australian society and institutions, with dozens of witnesses, many speaking anonymously out of fear for their safety.

==== 4 May 2026 ====
On the first day, Bell heard oral submissions from 12 witnesses. Sheina Gutnick, whose father Reuven Morrison was killed in the Bondi attack and who had led the weeks-long public campaign for the establishment of the Royal Commission, was the first witness called. Gutnick described being verbally abused in a shopping centre while holding her baby and wearing a Star of David necklace, when a stranger pointed to the star and called her a "fucking terrorist." She described Bondi Beach as now holding "a really really heavy weight in our community's heart."

Holocaust survivor Peter Halasz also testified on the first day, describing his reluctance to wear Jewish symbols in public due to fear of harassment. Jewish communal leader and Bondi Beach massacre survivor Alex Ryvchin gave evidence about the broader communal impact of the attack and the preceding surge in antisemitism. Other witnesses testified about Jewish school children being verbally abused and harassed in public, and a teacher making the Nazi salute at students.

That same day, a man was arrested outside the building housing the Royal Commission for wearing a t-shirt displaying a swastika and antisemitic messages.

==== 5 May 2026 ====
On 5 May, the Commission heard oral testimony from former NSW Jewish Board of Deputies chief executive Vic Alhadeff OAM, Jewish Community Security Group NSW volunteer Natalie Levy, Bialik College principal Jeremy Stowe-Lindner, and Executive Council of Australian Jewry co-chief executive Peter Wertheim. Witnesses shared accounts of antisemitism, the conflation of Israel with Jews, and personal trauma from the Bondi Beach attack.

Witness Nir Golan told the Commissioner that police had advised him to abandon a case against a man who had made antisemitic slurs, death threats, and performed Nazi salutes against him in public, because they believed it had little chance of being successfully prosecuted.

==== 6 May 2026 ====
On 6 May, Bell heard evidence from Zionist Federation of Australia president Jeremy Leibler, who testified in person about his concerns for the future of Jewish life in Australia. A teenage survivor of the Bondi Beach shooting also gave evidence, as did several students and teachers who had encountered incidents of antisemitism at school. Gayle Smith of JewishCare Victoria told the Commissioner the retirement home had invested $1.8 million in security measures and guards following the post-October 7 surge in antisemitism.

==== 7 May 2026 ====
On 7 May, the Royal Commissioner heard from 12 witnesses including Jillian Segal, the Australian Special Envoy to Combat Antisemitism.

==== 8 May 2026 ====
On 8 May, eight witnesses gave evidence including a gay Jewish convert who reported experiencing antisemitism and hostility towards Israel from within the LGBT community.

===== Key themes from testimony =====
Several common themes emerged across the first hearing block:

- Concealment of Jewish identity: Numerous witnesses described hiding their Jewish identity in public out of fear. One witness described wearing his kippah under a baseball cap; a teenage girl said she was "scared" to wear Jewish jewellery in public, tucking it under her clothing if she wore it at all.
- Antisemitism in schools: A Year 10 student, speaking under a pseudonym, described classmates performing Nazi salutes towards her during a class studying The Boy in the Striped Pyjamas. A Jewish school president described security measures that had made her school "feel more like a prison than a place of learning." Another school had been graffitied with text branding Jews as "terrorists" and "dogs."
- Abuse in public spaces: One witness described being physically assaulted in broad daylight, with only one bystander — an American tourist — attempting to intervene, who was himself assaulted. A witness said "a lot of us don't feel safe" in Australia anymore, adding: "We never expected synagogues to be burned down. We never expected Jews to be hunted on Bondi Beach."
- Psychological trauma from the Bondi attack: Witnesses described lasting psychological trauma. One woman said her daughter "thinks about dying" every time she visits the beach. A teenager who was locked down at a bat mitzvah during the attack described living with "constant nightmares." One man told Commissioner Bell: "It changed the course of my life, and it changed the course, unfortunately, of so many other people's lives."
- Institutional security costs: Multiple witnesses described significant financial outlays on security. The JewishCare Victoria retirement home's $1.8 million security investment was cited as emblematic of the broader burden placed on Jewish institutions.

Additionally, Rabbi Benjamin Elton, Chief Minister of Sydney's historic Great Synagogue, testified about a caravan discovered in Sydney that allegedly contained a handwritten note reading "fuck the Jews" alongside the address of his synagogue. Although Elton found testifying before the commission challenging, he told the Times of Israel: "This truth-telling is essential if we are to correct this terrible situation for our Australian society."

Josh Gomperts, a 31-year-old Jewish paramedic volunteering with Melbourne's Jewish volunteer ambulance service Hatzolah, described a 90-year-old patient performing a Nazi salute at him after noticing his kippah, and a volunteer firefighter at a regional Australian music festival who threatened to "skin him alive" after learning he was Jewish.

=== Hearing block 4 ===
In July 2026, the commission found that X was a "key perpetrator in the proliferation of antisemitic hate in the online environment."

== Reports ==
The Commissioner is required to produce both an interim report focusing on urgent and other actions, due by 30 April 2026, and a final report due by 14 December 2026.

=== Interim report ===
The interim report was released on 30 April 2026. It made 14 recommendations to strengthen the government's counter-terrorism responses, including five that remain classified. Notable recommendations have included making the federal government's anti-terrorism coordinator a full-time position; that the federal and state governments harmonise firearms legislation; prioritise a national gun buyback scheme based on the one instituted after the Port Arthur massacre; reviewing joint counter-terrorism teams; introducing counter-terrorism exercises for members of the National Security Committee and National Cabinet; and increasing security at high-risk Jewish events in New South Wales. The report also cleared the Australian authorities of failing to prevent or respond to the 2025 Bondi Beach shooting.

==== Reactions ====
In a press conference, Albanese said that the National Security Committee adopted and will implement every recommendation relating to the Commonwealth, and that they will work with state and territory governments to implement other recommendations.

Local MP Allegra Spender was "pleased" with commitment to implement all recommendations.

Queensland's Minister for Police and Community Safety Dan Purdie stated that the government supports some recommendations, but ruled out a gun buyback. Minns stated that the NSW government will implement the recommendations in full.

The Coalition issued a strongly worded response, stating that the Albanese government had "resisted the establishment of this Royal Commission, and only conceded that it should occur after overwhelming pressure from the community and the Coalition." The Coalition characterised the report as painting "a damning picture of a Prime Minister and his Cabinet that simply do not take national security seriously enough", and criticised the government for abolishing the dedicated Counter-Terrorism Coordinator position. The Coalition further argued that the report confirmed "the Government's failures to act on known intelligence, weak coordination and unclear leadership across the national security system."

=== Final report ===
The final report is due by 14 December 2026, one year after the attack.

== Public reception ==
Some witnesses and observers expressed scepticism about whether the commission's findings would translate into meaningful legislative or policy change. Several Jewish Australians who gave evidence during the first hearing block voiced uncertainty that the inquiry would drive concrete outcomes.

Dennis Altman, Vice Chancellor's Fellow at La Trobe University, accepted the IHRA definition adopted by the commission but expressed reservations about its accompanying examples, noting the contrast in how the characterisation of Israel as racist is treated differently from similar characterisations of other countries.

Public policy researcher Scott Prasser, an expert on royal commissions, raised concerns about the pace of the interim report, noting it was produced before any public hearings had taken place and arguing that the process had been rushed. "To me, they should have been talking to some people, preferably in public hearings, before we have any sort of interim report," he told SBS News.

Former chair of the disability royal commission Ronald Sackville noted the interim report was likely confined to examining the actions of intelligence agencies and police forces, and that a complete analysis of all law enforcement issues arising from the Bondi attack may not have been possible within the interim report's timeframe.

The anti-Zionist Jewish advocacy group Jewish Council of Australia has separately criticised what it views as a conflation of antisemitism with criticism of Israel in the broader policy debate surrounding the commission, and raised concerns that proposed legislative measures could "create a hierarchy of categories of racism" and undermine multicultural efforts to tackle racism more broadly.

== See also ==
- Antisemitism in Australia § 2000s–2020s
- Forced assimilation
- Group cohesiveness
- In-group and out-group
- List of Australian royal commissions
- Royal Commission into Aboriginal Deaths in Custody
- Royal Commission of Inquiry into the Attack on Christchurch Mosques
