= Jennifer Westacott =

Australian business executive

Jennifer Westacott AC is an Australian business executive. She served as the chief executive of the Business Council of Australia (BCA) from 2011 to 2023. She is the current chancellor of Western Sydney University.

She grew up in Springfield in New South Wales, Australia and completed her secondary education at Henry Kendall High School. She completed a Bachelor of Arts (Honours) from the University of New South Wales. She also holds a Graduate Management Certificate from the Monash Mt Eliza Business School and was a Chevening Scholar at the London School of Economics.

Following a career in the NSW and Victorian public sectors, she was a senior partner at KPMG in Sydney, Australia from 2005 to 2011, before assuming the role of chief executive of the Business Council of Australia. She is also a non-executive director of Wesfarmers.

== Recognition ==
She received an honorary doctorate from the University of New South Wales in 2017. In 2018, Westacott was awarded an Officer of the Order of Australia (AO) for her service to policy development and reform, cross sector collaboration, equity and business. Westacott was later elevated in the 2025 King's Birthday Honours to a Companion in the Order of Australia (AC) for eminent service to business, to tertiary education administration, to the mental health sector, and to the community.

== Activism ==
Jennifer Westacott is recognised as a leading campaigner against anti-Semitism in Australian universities. In 2025 she was nominated for The Australian Newspaper Australian of the Year award for 2025 for her 'strong stance against Jewish hatred in education.' Ms Westacott is a Guardian of the Dor Foundation. She has spoken out about anti-Semitism on Australian university campuses. In her personal submission to the Royal Commission on Antisemitism and Social Cohesion, Ms Westacott accused 'the university sector of hiding behind free speech protections while allowing hate speech to flourish on campus'. She stated that Australian universities saw 'Placards calling for the murder of Jews, chants calling for the annihilation of the Jewish state, behaviour designed to intimidate and to drive fear into a specific group of people'. Such chants included 'from the river to the sea' which Ms Westacott stated calls for 'the annihilation of the Jewish state' and 'was not free speech. This was hate speech. We used the concept of context, particularly at universities, as camouflage for abhorrent language attacking and threatening Jewish people.' She committed Western Sydney University to 'shut down anti-Semitic language, placards, protests, lectures, wherever we see it'.

Jennifer Westacott is a member of the independent board of the National Centre for Education Against Antisemitism announced by Special Envoy to Combat Antisemitism, Jillian Segal. On 11 November 2026, she spoke alongside Jillian Segal about antisemitism training and clearer workplace rules and reporting of antisemitism against Jewish employees. She said the National Centre for Education Against Antisemitism would be 'begin delivering training quickly and then seek accreditation.'

In 2024, Jennifer Westacott visited Israel as joint lead of the Business Council of Australia 4th Annual Women Leaders’ delegation to Israel. She wrote that Australians can learn from Israelis' '"can do’’ culture' which makes 'innovation part of their culture'.

== Personal Life ==
Jennifer Westacott has linked her fight against anti-Semitism to her own personal history, speaking of her late father's anti-Semitism. In 2024, wrote about her family 'that includes two people, a mother and her son, who are from an Islamic background, who are stateless because they faced genocide in Afghanistan, who were forced to flee, and now live as asylum-seekers'. She linked them to her activism on anti-Semitism, writing that 'they are our family, and my partner, Tess, and I love them. And I am doing so as someone who has endured sexism and homophobia'.

Academic offices
Preceded by Peter Shergold	Chancellor of Western Sydney University; 2023–	Incumbent
