= 2024 Melbourne synagogue attack =

Terrorist attack in Australia

- Part of alleged 2024 Iranian operations inside Australia
- Location: 37.8758°S 144.9959°E; Adass Israel Synagogue, Ripponlea, Victoria, Australia
- Date: 6 December 2024; 4:10 a.m. (AEDT; UTC+11:00)
- Target: Synagogue
- Attack type: Arson attack
- Weapon: Petrol
- Motive: Antisemitism
- Accused: Iran (allegedly organised): Islamic Revolutionary Guard Corps (IRGC); Three men from Melbourne have been charged with arson

On 6 December 2024, at approximately 4:10 am local time, an arson attack took place at the Adass Israel Synagogue of Melbourne in Ripponlea, a suburb of Melbourne, Australia. The resulting fire injured one member of the synagogue and caused significant damage to the building. On 9 December 2024, Victoria Police stated the incident was being treated as a terrorist attack. The investigation of the attack was assigned to the Joint Counter-Terrorism Team consisting of the Australian Federal Police, Victoria Police and the Australian Security Intelligence Organisation. The perpetrators of the attack reportedly used an accelerant and followed by spreading that throughout the interior of the building with a broom before lighting the accelerant fluid.

On 26 August 2025, Australian Prime Minister Anthony Albanese announced that ASIO have determined Iran was allegedly involved in planning the attack. The attack was one of multiple 2024 Iranian operations inside Australia.

== Background ==
=== Adass Israel Synagogue ===
The targeted synagogue in the December 2024 attack was the Orthodox Adass Israel Synagogue of Melbourne, located in Ripponlea, Victoria. It was built in 1965, designed by Ernest Fooks, and opened on 19 September 1965. It is part of the Adass Israel Congregation, a Jewish group in Melbourne that traces its origins to a split in the Elwood Talmud Torah Hebrew Congregation in 1939/1940. Some of its early members were boys and men who had been sent to Australia by the British on the infamous Dunera in 1941.

According to Philip Zajac, President of the Jewish Community Council of Victoria, the Adass Israel congregation is apolitical with regards to the State of Israel. When the sounding electoral boundaries were reviewed, (Note: a non-partisan process in Australia, under the Australian Electoral Commission.) one of the discussion papers presented stated that "Adass Israel’s political interests differ considerably in many ways" compared to neighbouring Jewish communities in Melbourne, and "Of particular note is the non-Zionist nature of the Adass Israel community; indeed it has ties to groups that are openly anti-Zionist".

The Synagogue was previously vandalised in 1989, and it was severely damaged in an arson attack on 1 January 1995. The synagogue had last been the subject of an arson in 1995, in which all the Torah scrolls were kept safe from the fire. In that case, police did not find any evidence that antisemitism or racism motivated the crime.

=== Elsewhere in Australia ===
The 2024 arson attack at Adass Israel Synagogue took place in a period where the Australian Government's National Terrorism Threat Level was at probable after being raised in August 2024, indicating that there is a greater than 50% chance of a terrorist attack or attack planning taking place in Australia's near future. The threat level had previously been at probable level since shortly after November 2015's Paris terror attacks until 2022 when it was lowered to possible.

Following the Gaza war succeeding the October 7 attacks, vandalism and intimidation directed at synagogues occurred at various locations in Australia. In an incident occurring on 8 October 2023, in New South Wales (a neighbouring state to the North of Victoria), two individuals walked past a synagogue and shouted “Allahu Akbar”, before saying that they would “blow up the synagogue”. On 11 October 2023, in Melbourne, a synagogue received a bomb threat. On 23 November 2023, in Western Australia, an individual threw two glasses of red paint at a synagogue. In December 2023, hoax bomb threats were made to several synagogues across Australia. On 26 November 2024, a Chabad synagogue in St Kilda, Melbourne was vandalised with pro-Palestinian and antisemitic graffiti.

== Attack ==
In the early hours of 6 December 2024, two masked men entered the Adass Israel Synagogue of Melbourne in Ripponlea. The men began pouring an accelerant on the floor and spreading it throughout the interior of the building with a broom when they were disturbed by a congregant who was attending the synagogue. The two perpetrators set the accelerant alight just before 4:10 am and fled the scene in a stolen Volkswagen Golf. The fire spread quickly causing extensive damage to the inside of the synagogue and collapsing part of the roof. Two members of the synagogue were inside at the time. One member who left the synagogue to call police sustained minor injuries to his hands after returning to the synagogue.

Dozens of emergency service crews, including 65 firefighters, were called to the synagogue shortly after the blaze first started. Firefighters spent more than an hour containing the blaze. A crime scene was established after the fire had been put out and members of the synagogue where allowed to enter in the afternoon of 6 December 2024 to retrieve the Torah scrolls, holy books, tallits, tefillin, other artefacts and some personal items. Police estimate the fire caused damage in excess of A$20 million.

== Aftermath ==
On 9 December, in the wake of the synagogue attack, the AFP established Taskforce Avalite to investigate antisemitism in Australia. The Australian Security Intelligence Organisation (ASIO) also announced it would be assisting the taskforce in its investigation. Following the incident, police in Canberra increased patrols around synagogues in the nation's capital. The Sydney Jewish community organised a demonstration on 15 December 2024, at Martin Place, protesting the Australian government's inadequate response to antisemitism. On 17 December 2024, Victorian Premier Jacinta Allan announced new measures impacting public protests as part of an effort to prevent antisemitic behaviour. The proposed laws would establish safe access in close proximity to places of worship and prohibit disturbances of religious gatherings. There are ongoing investigations on some of the reported antisemitic attacks. Anthony Albanese suggested that the attacks may have involved actors without ideological commitment being funded externally.

=== Arrests ===
On 16 July 2025, the Victorian Joint Counter Terrorism Team (JCCT) charged a 20-year-old man from Melton South over the theft of the blue Volkswagen Golf used in the arson attack. The Golf had previously been used in another arson attack at the Lux nightclub in South Yarra in November 2024 and an arson and shooting in Bundoora on the same night as the synagogue attack.

Two men had been arrested previously in relation to the Lux nightclub fire on 15 May 2025, with a police spokesperson indicating after the arrest, that the two men were not directly involved in the synagogue attack and that the arson attack at Lux nightclub was not a political attack.

The JCCT later charged three men with arson, conduct endangering life and theft of a motor vehicle with police alleging that they set fire to the synagogue. On 31 July 2025, the JCCT charged 21-year-old Giovanni Laulu from Werribee, on 21 August 2025, the JCCT charged 20-year-old Younes Ali Younes from Meadow Heights, and on 19 June 2026, the JCCT charged a 20-year-old man from Airport West. None of the three men were charged with terrorism offences.

=== Misinformation and conspiracy theories ===
Following the attack, Antoun Issa, a former Guardian Australia journalist and chief of staff to Greens senator Mehreen Faruqi, made conspiratorial claims that the attack may have been a "false flag" perpetrated by Zionists. Issa was reportedly reprimanded for his comments and was counselled over the statement. A similar conspiratorial statement blaming a Jewish conspiracy for the attack was made by Wissam Haddad (also known as Abu Ousayd), an Islamic preacher in Sydney who previously came under public scrutiny for antisemitic remarks. The preacher's statement was criticised by the New South Wales Premier, Chris Minns.

=== Continued targeting of Australian synagogues ===
The targeting of Australian synagogues continued after the Melbourne incident with the Southern Sydney Synagogue in Allawah vandalised on 10 January 2025. The Southern Sydney Synagogue was previously firebombed in 1991. On 11 January 2025, the Newtown Synagogue in Sydney's Inner West was vandalised, with the arsonists also attempting to set the synagogue on fire.

On 4 July 2025, an unknown perpetrator attempted to set East Melbourne Hebrew Congregation on fire by pouring a flammable liquid on the entrance and igniting it.

=== Iranian involvement ===
On 26 August 2025, Australian Prime Minister Anthony Albanese announced that ASIO determined Iran was allegedly involved in planning the attack. As a result, Iranian ambassador to Australia Ahmad Sadeghi was expelled from the country and Australia suspended operations of its embassy in Tehran. On 27 November 2025, Australia listed the Islamic Revolutionary Guard Corps (IRGC) as a "state sponsor of terrorism" under the Criminal Code Amendment (State Sponsors of Terrorism) Act 2025.

== Reactions ==
=== Australia ===
==== Australian Federal Government ====
Prime Minister Anthony Albanese said on a radio interview on 6 December that he was "outraged" at the attack. He revealed that he had been briefed that same day by the Australian Federal Police (AFP) commissioner, and that the attack was deliberate and CCTV footage had shown the two assailants spread an accelerant throughout the building with a broom before setting it alight. Albanese also spoke to the government's special envoy for antisemitism, Jillian Segal, on 6 December. On 8 December, Albanese stated the incident was "quite clearly" an act of terrorism, and announced A$32.5 million in federal funding for security upgrades to Jewish schools and community centres. Other governmental bodies to condemn the incident included the Australian Human Rights Commission, which stated: "Antisemitism is abhorrent. It is a form of racism which has no place in Australia. This attack is the latest incident in a trend of significant rises in antisemitism." In response to the government's condemnation of the attack and the establishment of the dedicated police taskforce, Jillian Segal, Australia's Special Envoy on Antisemitism, pointed to the lack in serious penalties applied to individuals arrested in related events, such as those flying prohibited flags, and that it has set a tone of permissiveness in Australian society.

==== Victorian Government ====
Premier of Victoria Jacinta Allan condemned the attack as an "evil antisemitic attack". On 6 December, at a press conference in front of the synagogue, Allan pledged A$100,000 from the state government to fund the rebuilding of the synagogue. While at the site, the premier was heckled by local Jewish residents. Allan returned unannounced to the site several days later where she was shown the portion of the site destroyed by the firebombing. Similarly, the incident was condemned by local elected officials.

==== Liberal Party of Australia ====
Federal Leader of the Opposition, Peter Dutton, said the attack was abhorrent, and that it was to be expected due to what he sees as a lack of compassion for the Jewish people from the Albanese government. Dutton also stated that the funding announced by the federal government on 8 December should be allowed to be used to fund armed guards for Jewish schools and community centres.

==== Australian Jewish community groups ====
The Executive Council of Australian Jewry called for the Australian government to address the incident with action and not merely words, stating "“We ask you, Prime Minister, to reflect on how this has been allowed to occur. We ask you to reflect on how the conditions in which a synagogue can be set alight have been allowed to develop. Your words swiftly condemning the attack were heard by our community. However, the time for mere words has long passed. We now call for action." The Jewish Community Council of Victoria condemned the attack; JCCV CEO Naomi Levin stated: “We were absolutely shocked, but not surprised, to hear that a synagogue here in Melbourne had been attacked overnight. The Jewish community has been warning about an unacceptable rise in antisemitism for more than a year. We hoped it would never come to this, but today, our fears have been realised.” The Jewish Council of Australia issued a statement condemning the attack, stating, "This reprehensible act of violence is an attack not only on the synagogue but on Jewish communities more broadly." The Jewish Council also condemned efforts by a senior staffer from the Australian Greens to label the attack as a false flag, as the claim would only deepen antisemitic sentiment. The Australian Jewish Association released a statement in which they felt 'outraged' but not surprised due to their view that Australian Jews had been abandoned by the Albanese government.

==== Religious leaders ====
The attack was condemned by the Victorian Multicultural Commission's multifaith advisory group, stating: "Places of worship hold profound meaning for people of faith. The right to feel safe and free to worship in these sacred spaces is fundamental and must be respected and protected. We stand together to promote understanding, respect and harmony among all faith communities and people of goodwill. We assure them of our loving prayers and meditation." Separately, the Catholic Archdiocese of Melbourne condemned the attack, stating that "A peaceful place of worship has been violated—nothing can justify such violence. Antisemitism has no place in our society. We stand in prayerful solidarity with members of the Jewish community at this time." And the Australian Federation of Islamic Councils (AFIC) condemned the attack, stating: “Such acts of hatred and violence must be met with a swift and firm response from law enforcement. We urge the authorities to thoroughly investigate this matter and ensure that those responsible are held accountable.” Nationally, the attack was condemned by the National Council of Churches in Australia (NCCA), stating: "It is for all of us to step up as peacemakers and commit to upholding the safety and harmony of our multi-cultural and multi-faith society in Australia." And the event was described in a statement by Anglican Archbishop of Sydney, who condemned an antisemitic attack in Sydney, stating: "The latest attack on the Jewish community in Sydney is egregious, cowardly and despicable. All people of good will, faith or none, will condemn this outrage. It follows the terrorist attack on the Adass Israel synagogue in Melbourne, and more than a year of increasing hostility and intimidation of the Australian Jewish community in multiple, grotesque ways."

==== Others ====
On 7 December, former Liberal MP Josh Frydenberg and former Labor senator Nova Peris called at a press conference for the federal government to declare the event a terrorist attack. Frydenberg said that Jewish Australians were now talking openly about leaving the country and that young Jews are forced to conceal their faith and ethnicity for fear of attack. Peris called the attack 'totally deplorable'. Other civic and religious groups to condemn the attack included a group of eighteen Turkish-Australian religious and secular organisations from New South Wales, and the Human Rights Law Centre.

=== Israel ===
Prime Minister of Israel Benjamin Netanyahu criticised the Albanese government following the incident, linking the event to Australia's position on the Middle East. President Isaac Herzog said that he has spoken with Albanese about the attack, and had told Albanese that the recent antisemitic attacks required 'strong and firm action'.

=== United States of America ===
On 10 December 2024, the Simon Wiesenthal Center issued a travel warning for Jews visiting Australia, advising them to exercise "extreme caution" and that they were "not convinced that Jews are safe [in Australia]".

=== United Kingdom ===
Six members of the UK Parliament sponsored a motion for the parliament to condemn the arson attack on the Adass Israel Synagogue and to acknowledge that trends of antisemitism have also unfolded in the UK. The motion calls on the UK government to address antisemitism both at home and abroad and to provide funding to secure synagogues and Jewish schools.

== See also ==
- Antisemitism in Australia
- 1981 Sydney Israeli Consulate and Hakoah Club bombings
- 1990 Melbourne synagogue attacks
- 1991 Sydney synagogue attacks
- Destruction of the Rafi'-Nia synagogue
- List of synagogues in Iran
- List of attacks on Jewish institutions
- Malka Leifer affair – criminal case and extradition dispute
- Operation Shelter – police initiative in a neighbouring state
- Sydney nurses anti-Israel remarks incident
- Strictly Jewish: The Secret World of Adass Israel – documentary
- Yusef Abad Synagogue – Orthodox synagogue in Tehran
