= Antisemitism in Australia =

History of anti-Jewish activity in Australian society

Antisemitism has affected Jews in Australia since Australia's Jewish community was established in the 18th century. It became more pronounced in the late 19th century, rising further in the 20th and early 21st centuries. A number of community organisations track anti-Jewish activities, including the Executive Council of Australian Jewry, which publishes an annual list of all antisemitic activities reported to it, and the Community Security Groups (CSG) responsible for local communal security. According to the Anti-Defamation League's 2024 Global100 survey, an estimated 20% of Australian residents harboured antisemitic views. Ten years earlier the estimate was 14%. Threats to Australian Jewish life have been perpetrated by individuals from different backgrounds, representing a small minority of Australians, impacting Jewish safety and security. Overseas actors have also played a role. Australian Jews are among the most targeted minorities in Australia. Antisemitism has manifested in attacks on Australian Jews and their religious and communal institutions, in media and antisemitic publications, in primary and secondary education, in higher education, in civic life, on social media, and in past efforts to prevent Jewish immigration.

Recent surges, particularly following the October 7 attacks, highlight its ongoing presence, and its impact on Australian Jews with survey findings of widespread scepticism of government's ability to combat racism with "hate speech" laws. Advocacy by Jewish organisations, legislative measures, and condemnation by political leaders illustrate efforts to combat these issues, yet threats to Australian Jewish life remains a persistent societal concern. In particular, a major threat stems from Islamic fundamentalists operating in Australia.

The first known fatal attack targeting Jews in Australia was the 2025 Bondi Beach shooting, which resulted in 16 deaths (including one of the attackers) at a Hanukkah celebration at Bondi Beach organised by Chabad. Jewish leaders have criticised the Australian government for failing to take appropriate measures in response to the escalating antisemitism prior to the attack. State leaders have since acknowledged and apologised for failing to ensure the safety of the Australian Jewish community.

== Early history ==
=== Before World War II ===
In his 1989 review of early history of antisemitism in Australia (colonial period through the immediate postwar period), Sol Encel, observed that aside from its impact on immigration policy, antisemitism in Australia in this period can be viewed as a relatively minor social problem. According to Encel, anti-Jewish prejudice in Australia dates back to the first arrival of British convicts, eight of whom were Jews. Nonetheless, the colonial period was marked by the absence of institutionalised antisemitism found in Europe. Jews in Australia were never formally barred from entering the professions, sciences, academia, and arts. Despite being British subjects, Jews ran for political office in Australian parliaments even before it was legal for Jews to do so in the United Kingdom. Suzanne Rutland argues that antisemitism started to become prevalent in the country in the 1880s alongside the rise of Australian nationalism and the campaign to establish the Federation of Australia. Trade unions, politicians and the media were hostile to the small number of Russian Jewish arrivals in the country. In 1915, the Labor Party politician, Frank Anstey published a pamphlet, The Kingdom of Shylock, which included antisemitic elements, some of which he removed in a later edition. Circulation of the original pamphlet was suppressed due to its antisemitic content.

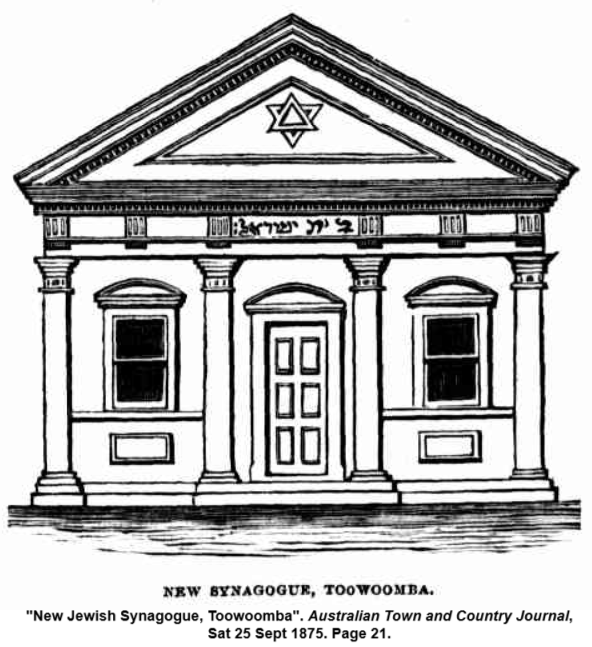
Beth Yisrael, the Toowoomba Synagogue, was the site of the earliest known synagogue attack in Australia

In the case of the Emanuel Solomon and Vaiben Solomon and their descendants, who arrived in the early 19th century and helped form a mercantile network composed of Jewish and non-Jewish members, correspondences concerning their entrepreneurial efforts contain occasional complaints over antisemitism they experienced in Australia.

In 1933, the Jewish Telegraphic Agency reported on antisemitic statements of a University of Melbourne professor.

In the late 1930s, antisemitic agitation concerning the purchasing of land by Jews was refuted by government officials.

During the wave of Jewish immigration in 1938–39, Frank Clarke, president of the Victorian Legislative Council, offered graphic depictions of refugees as "rat-faced men". Other incidents in this period include a 1920 arson attack on the synagogue in Toowoomba, Queensland (see § Attacks on synagogues).

=== World War II and postwar period ===
The second wave of Jewish refugees arrived between 1938 and 1939 and it was also denounced by an antisemitic Australian press and anti-Jewish statements were made by politicians. Pressure groups such as the Australian Natives' Association and Returned and Services League of Australia spearheaded resolutions against Jewish immigration. Nevertheless, the state of Australian antisemitism did not culminate in acts of violence like the acts of violence that were being perpetrated in Europe at that time. Nevertheless, there were reports of antisemitic attacks which were perpetrated against Jews by local Nazi sympathizers. In 1941, there were reports of antisemitic propaganda being circulated across Sydney suburbs. The Social Crediter, a publication run by C. H. Douglas, produced in England and circulated in Australia, was accused of promoting antisemitic propaganda. The New South Wales division of the social credit movement denounced the antisemitic material in The Social Crediter. A related publication, New Times, published by Eric Butler, was accused of promoting antisemitism. After the war, The Bulletin published antisemitic cartoons, pushing against Jewish immigration. In 1947, the Australian Journalists Association formed a committee to investigate the extent of antisemitism in the Australian press. By 1950, the Jewish Council to Combat Fascism and Anti-Semitism (JCCFAS) observed that 80,000 copies of a single antisemitic pamphlet were distributed in Australia, and alleged that the Jewish community was often uninformed of these developments. In response, JCCFAS published and distributed 30,000 copies of a pamphlet titled "Anti-Semitism: A Menace to Australia". In some instances, antisemitic publications distributed in the 1950s were originally printed in South Africa. In 1949, the Jewish cemetery in Sydney was vandalised. In 1950, a North Carlton Synagogue and Talmud Torah were vandalised by local youths.

During this period, Arthur Calwell, the minister of immigration adopted measures to ensure that Jews would not constitute more than 0.5% of the country's population. Calwell also halted all immigration of Jews of Middle Eastern origin. There was a 25% cap on Jewish passengers travelling on Australia-bound ships and planes. In the late 1940s, Australian antisemitism continued to involve a strong focus on the prevention of Jewish immigration. In the postwar period, Jews were commonly refused membership to Australian country clubs, this led to the 1951 founding of the Cranbourne Country Club.

In 1959, Sam Goldbloom, a prominent activist and a federal Labor candidate, was specifically targeted in the publication and circulation of antisemitic pamphlets. Also in 1959, the World Jewish Congress reported that antisemitic literature produced in Australia had turned up in Turkey. In January 1960, a series of antisemitic graffiti was reportedly drawn in Melbourne, including graffiti which was drawn at a Jewish community center. The incident was condemned by Melbourne's two archbishops. Also in January 1960, antisemitic graffiti in Canberra targeted a Jewish bakery, and other buildings. And later, the Central Synagogue in Sydney was targeted by antisemitic graffiti. And later, antisemitic graffiti appeared in Queanbeyan. By the end of January, Jewish community groups reported that 20 to 30 antisemitic acts had taken place. This period saw similar incidents elsewhere around the world and became known as the Swastika epidemic of 1959–1960.

From 1960, Eric Butler's far-right and antisemitic Australian League of Rights, became a national movement. The organisation promoted The Protocols of the Elders of Zion and other antisemitic libels. The League assisted Holocaust denier David Irving with his visits to Australia. And Veritas, the League's publishing company, published Irving's work in Australia. There were also strong antisemitic sentiments from some non-Jewish refugees from Eastern Europe that had settled in Australia. They established Australian branches of the fascist, antisemitic movements such as the Ustaše from Croatia and the Hungarian Arrow Cross.

Other incidents during the 1960s involved public Nazi-related displays. In January 1962, Jewish graves in Sydney were vandalised. In 1965, Prime Minister Robert Menzies attended the inauguration of a new synagogue in City of Kew, a suburb of Melbourne where he laid the foundation stone. Two months later, in October, the synagogue was targeted with antisemitic vandalism. On May Day in 1966, individuals claiming affiliation with the National Socialist Party of Australia conducted a public march wearing Nazi uniforms and carrying a Nazi flag near the Yarra River in Melbourne. The group was attacked by a large group of local residents. In June 1966, a Jewish center in East St Kilda associated with the Hashomer Hatzair youth group was targeted with swastikas and Nazi slogans.

== 1967 to 1990s ==
Following the Six-Day War, some far-left activists pushed an anti-Israel agenda which was influenced by anti-Zionist propaganda which was produced in the Soviet Union, the circulation of this propaganda impacted some Australian university campuses. In the 1970s, the Australian Union of Students was under Trotskyist and Maoist influences and it proposed anti-Israel resolutions and Jewish students who opposed these resolutions were physically attacked. Attacks on Jewish property and institutions increased in response to the increase in tensions in the Middle East, leading to corresponding increases in the number and intensity of security measures. In 1975, ASIO documents revealed that Palestinian terrorists planned to kill high-profile Jewish figures, including the Israeli ambassador Michael Elizur and Jewish communal leader Isi Leibler and journalist Sam Lipski. Former prime minister Bob Hawke, who was deemed a vocal supporter of Israel, was also considered for attack. 1978 saw a Melbourne synagogue defaced with swastikas. The local community reported instituted new security measures to prevent additional incidents.

In the early 1970s, Jewish community leaders in New South Wales were targeted in a series of letter bombs.

The results of a 1969 survey revealed that approximately 20 per cent of Jewish refugees who were living in Australia and 30 per cent of non-refugee Australian Jews reported that they had experienced antisemitism in the country. The most common form of antisemitism reportedly consisted of antisemitic insults or threats, and a small number of antisemitic acts consisted of economic discrimination, social discrimination, and physical attacks. In 1977, an incident involving alleged antisemitic language in a Greek Australian newspaper resulted in an investigation by the federal commissioner for community relations.

=== 1980s–1990s ===
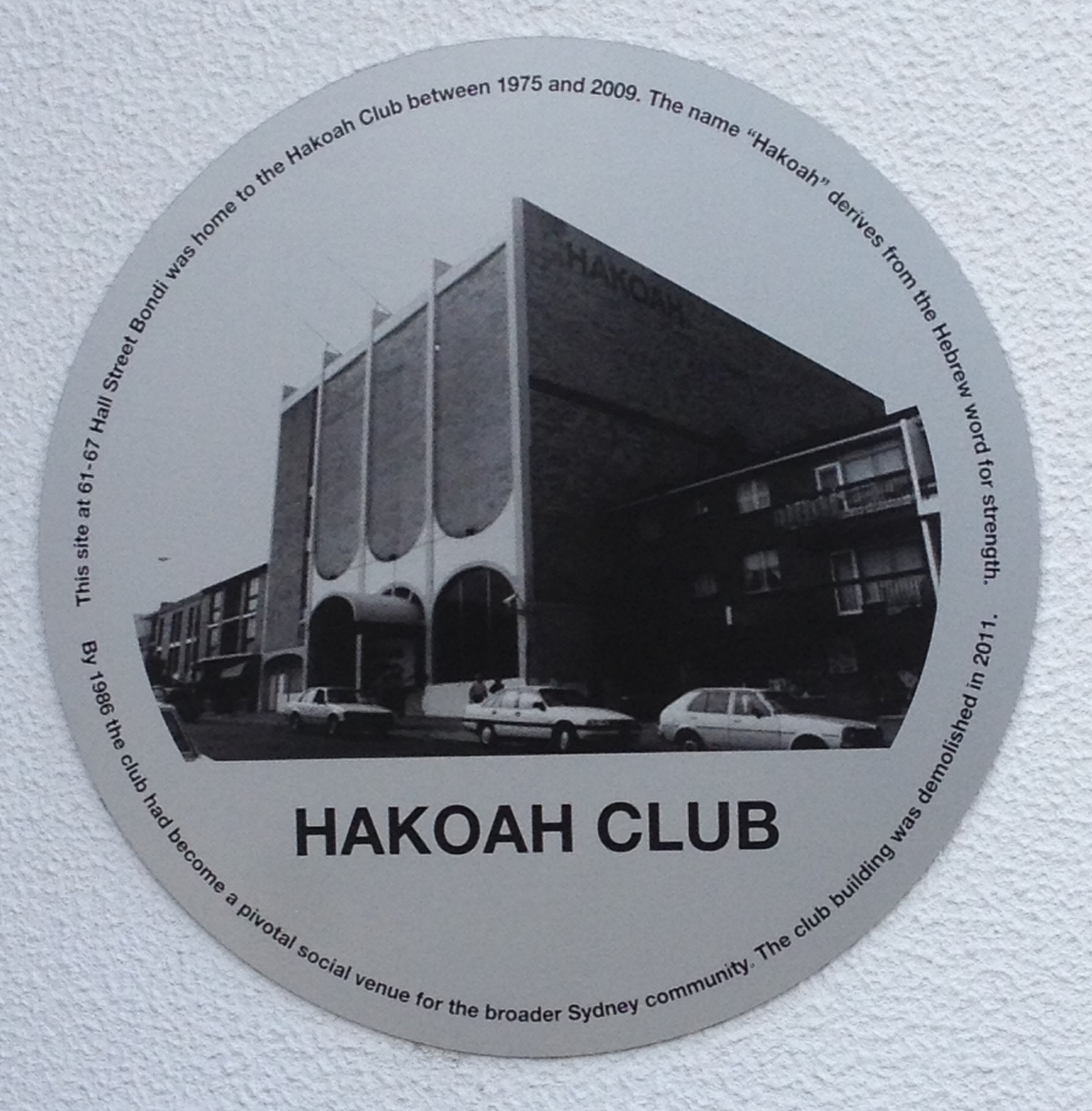
Public plaque commemorating the Hakoah Club in Bondi which was targeted in a 1982 bombing

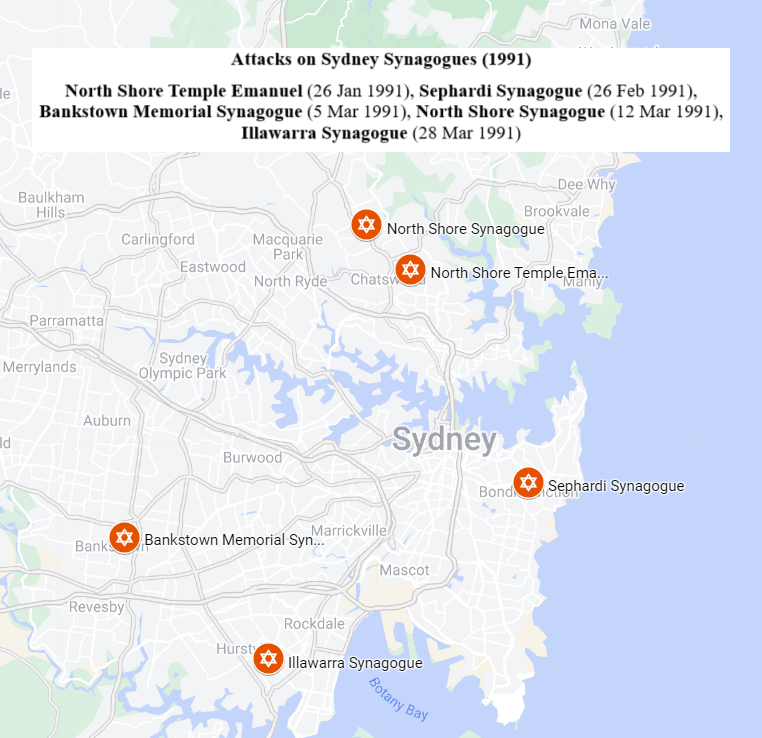
1991 Sydney synagogue attacks

Terrorism in Australia impacted the Australian Jewish community in the form of the 1982 bombing of a Jewish centre in Sydney. In 1982, the Sydney Israeli consulate and the Sydney Jewish Community Centre, Hakoah Club, were targeted in a twin bombing event. The attack on the Hakoah Club involved an explosive device detonated inside a vehicle parked at the Jewish centre in Bondi, NSW. Initial police investigations led to the arrest of a 31-year-old man who was charged in relation to the Hakoah Club explosion. The case went before the court, however, charges were later withdrawn by the NSW Attorney General. According to the New South Wales Jewish Board of Deputies, the Jewish community in Australia had been sheltered from past terror threats and warned that terrorist incidents could reoccur in the future. Following the bombing, security at the Hakoah club was tightened. Other threats against Jewish community institutions stemming from Arab terrorist groups arose in the late 1980s.

In 1988, a speech by Taj El-Din Hilaly, a prominent Muslim cleric, at the University of Sydney was treated by the Australian Jewish community as a significant attack against Jews. In a lecture to a group of Muslim students at the university, Hilaly made statements that aligned with major antisemitic tropes concerning Jews. Despite the subsequent critical coverage of the incident, Hilaly refused to apologise or retract his comments. The following year, the Executive Council of Australian Jewry began tracking antisemitic incidents across the country. In November 1989, three synagogues in Melbourne were vandalised with various antisemitic slogans and slurs. In 1992, the Australian Institute of Jewish Affairs revealed that an extremist network linked to LaRouche movement had been established to spy on Australian Jewish community leaders. In 1995, over 60 graves and headstones in the Jewish section of West Terrace Cemetery in Adelaide were desecrated, leading to condemnations from Israeli prime minister, Yitzhak Rabin and Australian prime minister, Paul Keating. The late 1980s and 1990s saw a number of significant attacks on Australian synagogues (see § Attacks on synagogues).

== 2000s to October 2023 ==
=== During the war on terror (2000s and 2010s) ===
After the 2001 terrorist attacks in the United States, the Australian Jewish community became a prime target of Al-Qaeda terror cells. At that time, the Community Security Group (CSG), a communal organisation responsible for security of synagogues, day schools, and other Australian Jewish institutions, shifted toward increased staffing levels in response to the growing threat of terrorist attacks against the Jewish community.

In the 2000s, Islamic terrorist threats appeared to be thwarted by Australian authorities. Instances include an Al-Qaeda plot to attack the 2000 Summer Olympics, the Israeli embassy in Canberra, as well as Jewish community targets. The plot was discovered after a raid on the house of Jack Roche who would be convicted in 2004. In 2003, Bilal Khazal, a Lebanese Australian, a former baggage handler for Qantas at Sydney Airport, and a prominent figure in the Islamic Youth Movement, an offshoot of Ahlus Sunnah Wal Jam'ah Association of Australia (ASWJA), was arrested for on terrorism charges including producing propaganda encouraging attacks on the Australian Jewish community.

In the early 2000s, a series of violent attacks targeting the Jewish community in Canberra took place, including one incident involving the firebombing of the Jewish centre during a community event.

The sale and distribution of antisemitic literature is one area of concern for the Australian Jewish community. In 2000, the Australian Human Rights and Equal Opportunity Commission (HREOC) found that Fredrick Töben had engaged in unlawful conduct in contravention of the Racial Discrimination Act (1975) in publishing material that was racially defaming of Jewish people on the Adelaide Institute website. Töben was ordered to remove the contents of the Adelaide Institute website from the internet and not to re-publish the content of that website in public elsewhere. He was also ordered to make a statement of apology. In the following years, Töben was unsuccessful in his efforts to appeal the ruling. In 2009, after Töben's website continued to house antisemitic material, Töben was sentenced to prison for three months for contempt of court. A similar case was that of Olga Scully, a resident of Tasmania who distributed antisemitic pamphlets. Scully was an associate of the Adelaide Institute and was active in the late 1990s and early 2000s. Scully was sued by the Executive Council of Australian Jewry (ECAJ). The ECAJ investigation of the matter involved ten years of gathering evidence. The case garnered significant attention in the Australian Jewish press.

In 2006, a spate of attacks on Australian synagogues occurred.

In 2007, anti-Jewish propaganda produced by an Islamic preacher in Sydney was criticised by Jewish community leaders.

In 2007, Jewish community members called for a government inquiry into antisemitism in Australia. That year, in the lead up to the Jewish New Year, the Community Security Group (CSG) held safety and security seminars for community members.

In the aftermath of the 2008 Mumbai attacks that included a deadly attack on a Chabad house, the Australian Jewish community substantially increased security funding through the Jewish Security Capital Appeal organised by the NSW Council for Jewish Communal Security. Jewish community leaders criticised Prime Minister Kevin Rudd's muted response to the terror attack and called on Rudd to condemn Islamic terrorism targeting Jewish community sites.

In 2011, during an open day event at the Lakemba Mosque, a visitor reportedly discovered that copies of the antisemitic Protocols of the Elders of Zion were available for sale at the mosque. The same year, reports were made of extensive antisemitic literature being housed by the Australian League of Rights.

Attacks on Jews also appeared linked to conflicts overseas, such as the 2014 Israel-Gaza war. Incidents included various acts of violence and harassment of Jews on the street, at universities, the use of newspaper cartoons relying on Jewish stereotypes, and the use of anti-Israel discourse to intimidate Jews. In 2014, a Hasidic Rebbe visiting Perth, Australia was accosted by a group of men of Middle Eastern appearance who aggressively shouted at the Rebbe and began pounding on the car windows. A Jewish school in Perth was also targeted by vandals. In New South Wales, a group of Jewish schoolchildren were harassed and subjected to antisemitic abuse.

In 2016, multiple headstones in the Nowra War Cemetery were vandalised with antisemitic graffiti.

In February and April 2019, a series of antisemitic graffiti incidents occurred in several areas in Sydney receiving wide condemnation from local officials. Other incidents occurred later that year in Melbourne.

Shortly before the 2023 surge in antisemitism there was a rise in far-right antisemitism in Australia, In June 2023 there were reports of glorification of groups such as the Ustaše (who participated in the Holocaust and have previously been deemed responsible for terrorist attacks in Australia).

=== During the COVID-19 pandemic ===
Australian antisemitism was linked to extremist ideology concerning the COVID-19 pandemic.

In 2021, a number of public spaces in Australia were vandalised with antisemitic graffiti, including a Melbourne oval, Parliament House in Hobart, and in other locations.

A notable case of antisemitism directed at Jewish students involves the allegations raised by Jewish students at Brighton Secondary College. Jewish students alleged that they faced extensive antisemitic bullying and harassment and that the school administration was notified on multiple occasions but took no action. Victorian MPs David Southwick and James Newbury advocated for an investigation into the school's response. Subsequently, former students filed a lawsuit against the school and alleged that the school principal, Richard Minack, had referred to Jews using derogatory language, and had spoken positively about his father who served in the German army in World War Two. Other schools noted for allegations of insufficient administrative response to antisemitism includes Lindfield Learning Village in North Sydney.

In November 2021, Jewish graves in Tasmania were vandalised.

In 2022, a Jewish draftee to the Australian Football League (AFL) faced extensive antisemitic reaction leading the AFL to investigate the incident.

In February 2023, Jewish graves in Maitland, New South Wales were vandalised.

== October 2023 to present ==
The Middle Eastern crisis (2023–present), including the Gaza War and the Iran war, as ongoing series of interrelated wars, conflicts, and heightened instability in the Middle East, has been associated with a surge in antisemitism in Australia. The 2024 Iranian operations inside Australia led to the a terrorist attack on a Melbourne synagogue. In December 2025, the first fatal antisemitic attack targeting Jews in Australia took place at the 2025 Bondi Beach shooting, which killed 15 people at a Hanukkah celebration at Bondi Beach. This attack led to the formation of the Royal Commission on Antisemitism and Social Cohesion. The Australian Federal Police assessed that the threat against Australian Jews from Islamic fundamentalists operating in the country remains high even after the Bondi attack.

Since the outbreak of the Israel-Hamas war, antisemitic attacks and other incidents surged in Australia. Incidents centred in Sydney and Melbourne as well as other regions such as the Sunshine Coast and Perth. Included in this round of antisemitic incidents were death threats to prominent Australian Jews, bomb threats to synagogues, and vandalism of Jewish owned shops. In November 2023, hundreds of prominent Australians signed a letter condemning the rise in antisemitism. The signatories included Daniel Andrews, Gladys Berejiklian, Lindsay Fox and Anthony Pratt.

Antisemitism at Australian universities was a focal point in the aftermath of the 7 October attacks. Of primary concern were allegations against the University of Sydney. In June 2024, the Australian opposition called for a Senate enquiry into campus antisemitism.

In September 2024, Jillian Segal, the government's special envoy to combat antisemitism, stated that antisemitism at universities has become 'systemic'. On 20 September 2024, at the senate inquiry into campus antisemitism, Mark Scott, the Vice-Chancellor of the University of Sydney admitted that the university had failed its Jewish students.

Antisemitism appeared in religious settings with reports of antisemitic rhetoric had been included in sermons delivered by extremist Islamic preachers in Sydney, and Melbourne. According to the Australian Federal Police, Islamic preachers targeting the Australian Jewish community have benefited from legal advice that provided them with guidance on how to avoid criminal prosecution while continuing to preach hatred. The NSW Police had previously declined to prosecute Islamic preachers who expressed calls that "Jews would drown" on the basis that it did not meet criminal thresholds.

According to a survey commissioned by Israeli NGO Combat Antisemitism Movement, conducted between June 27 and July 1, 2025, 24% of Australians describe public attitudes toward Jews as positive (9% "very positive" and 15% "slightly positive"). In contrast, 28% of respondents characterize the attitudes as negative (8% "very negative" and 20% "slightly negative"). Moreover, among Australians aged 18 to 34, one in five reported witnessing or hearing about antisemitic incidents in their area.

=== Key incidents ===
==== 2023 Sydney Opera House incident ====
On 9 October, after the NSW government projected the Israeli flag onto the Sydney Opera House as a light display to mark support for the victims of the October 7 attack, a pro-Palestinian rally in Sydney organised by Palestine Action Group took place in front of the Opera House with rally attendees allegedly chanting anti-Jewish statements. The event led to widespread criticism of the rally. This rally was widely covered with special attention to the alleged use of the chant "Gas the Jews". Months later, a police review found no evidence that the phrase was chanted, positing the possibility that the phrase being chanted was "where's the Jews". The police said that there was evidence of other chants used at the rally that were deemed offensive and socially unacceptable. Jewish community leaders criticised the police procedure that ignored eyewitness testimonies. The incident had a considerable impact on the Jewish community which identified it as a watershed moment marking the start of the surge of antisemitism in Australia. The state premier later conceded that the incident had not been sufficiently contained by NSW Police.

==== Sydney 'Jumping Castle' incident ====
In November 2023, a Jewish school in Sydney was denied services from a local jumping castle business. In response to an email request for a booking from Masada College in St Ives, the business owner wrote that "There is no way I am taking a Zionist booking, I don't want your blood money. Free Palestine". The incident prompted Chris Minns, Premier of New South Wales, to condemn the business owner's actions. After an inquiry, NSW police took no action against the business owner.

==== 2024 doxxing incident ====
In February 2024, more than 600 Jewish Australians working in academia and creative industries were targeted in a mass doxxing incident. A group of anti-Zionist activists shared a leaked transcript of a private WhatsApp group of over 600 people called 'J.E.W.I.S.H creatives and academics', leaking the names, images, professions and social media accounts of members. The leakers referred to it as a "leaked zionist group chat" and described the leak as an act of pro-Palestinian activism, stating the information had been leaked from the WhatsApp group by pro-Palestinian anti-Zionist Jews. The details leaked did not include home addresses, email addresses, or telephone numbers. The leakers referred to the list as the 'Zio600'. David Slucki, Director of the Australian Centre for Jewish Civilisation and the Loti Smorgon Associate Professor of Contemporary Jewish Life and Culture at Monash University, said that the term 'Zio' is "an antisemitic dog-whistle popularised by American white supremacist David Duke". Some members of the group had previously discussed campaigns targeting pro-Palestinian figures, including writer Clementine Ford, who was involved in the doxing; Leaders of Australia's Jewish community condemned the incident, including Alex Ryvchin, the co-CEO for the peak body for Australian Jews, the Executive Council of Australian Jewry, the NSW Jewish Board of Deputies and MP Josh Burns, who stated members of the leaked group had faced death threats, including a five-year-old child and one family had been forced into hiding. Several Jewish Australians whose details had been included in the leak reported on the personal and professional toll the leak had taken on them, including being forced to close their businesses and saw the leak as part of growing antisemitic intimidation that had previously been absent in Australia. The Albanese government was strongly critical of the publication of the list, and shortly thereafter announced new laws to combat doxing, the malicious release of personal information. In September 2024, Victorian Police arrested a woman in relation to the case.

==== 2024 Iranian operations in Australia ====
The Iranian government has been accused by Australian government of orchestrating a series of attacks on the Australian Jewish community. The Australian government alleged that an attack on an October 2024 attack on a Jewish restaurant in Sydney and a December 2024 attack on a Melbourne synagogue were orchestrated by Iran. The incidents were orchestrated as part of a wider series of efforts to attack Jews across diaspora communities.

==== January 2025 vandalism spree ====
On 17 January 2025, four vehicles and the home of a former Jewish community leader were vandalized in Sydney. Two of the vehicles were set on fire, with one was marked with an antisemitic slogan.

==== January 2025 caravan bomb incident ====
On 19 January 2025, NSW Police discovered a caravan filled with explosives with evidence suggesting that a Sydney synagogue was the intended target. The explosives were sufficient to create a blast capable of destroying up to 40 meters (130 feet). Notice of the incident was leaked to the public on 29 January. It was later reported that the explosives in the caravan were 40 years old and no detonator was present. Anonymous sources said the caravan was put in place by criminals who were aiming to obtain reduced sentences in return for informing police about the explosives.

==== January 2025 Maroubra childcare attack ====
On 21 January 2025, a childcare center in Maroubra, Sydney, was targeted in an arson attack. The centre, located near a synagogue and a Jewish school, was set ablaze, causing significant property damage and antisemitic slogans were graffitied on the wall of the centre. The attack was condemned by the prime minister, the NSW premier, and the NSW Jewish Board of Deputies. Calls were reissued for Prime Minister Anthony Albanese to convene the National Cabinet to address the issue of antisemitism in Australia, which occurred later that day. Additionally, NSW Police added an additional 20 investigators to Strike Force Pearl, the state's antisemitism taskforce, doubling the size of the team. Albanese and the AFP Chief Commissioner stated that the AFP were investigating whether the perpetrators of some of the incidents were "criminals for hire" paid to carry out the crimes, rather than ideologically motivated individuals. Following this, the federal police launched an investigation whether "overseas actors or individuals" are paying criminals to carry out antisemitic acts. The attack was condemned by the Australian National Imams Council. Two months after the attack, the children enrolled in the childcare centre resumed attendance in a temporary facility managed by Randwick City Council. And 15 months after the attack, the childcare centre was reopened. Months after the attack, evidence was uncovered linking the attack to the Iranian regime.

==== February 2025 Bankstown Hospital incident ====
In February 2025, two nurses employed at Bankstown Hospital were allegedly recorded making antisemitic statements regarding the treatment of patients. The nurses were stood down and the incident was condemned by the Prime Minister. The incident led some Jewish patients in local hospitals to request the removal of information on their records identifying them as Jewish.

==== July 2025 East Melbourne Synagogue attack ====
In July 2025, the East Melbourne Synagogue hosting a Shabbat dinner was targeted in an attack. The alleged perpetrator used flammable liquid to set the synagogue doors alight. Those attending the Shabbat dinner were evacuated safely. Victorian Police later arrested the alleged perpetrator.

==== 2025 Bondi terror attack ====
The most significant attack on Australian Jews occurred at Bondi Beach in 2025. The Jewish community refers to the event as the "Bondi Chanukah attack", the Australian government refers to the event as the Bondi Terror Attack. On 14 December 2025, a mass shooting occurred at Bondi Beach in Sydney during the annual Hanukkah lighting event hosted by Chabad of Bondi. Jewish community and Australian sources have referred to the event as the Bondi massacre (or Bondi Beach massacre). The attack resulted in the killing of 16 people, including one of the gunmen involved. At least 42 people, including 2 police officers were injured. About 30 shots were fired during the attack. A suspect was taken into police custody, after the other gunmen, his father, had been shot dead by police. The suspects are said to have been inspired by ISIS, as a handmade ISIS flag was found in the attackers' car near the scene of the shooting. According to police, Sajid Akram was licensed to own six firearms. The Australian prime minister also said that one was investigated in 2019 on suspicion of links with ISIS but was cleared at the time. Israeli prime minister Benjamin Netanyahu responded to the terrorist attack by accusing Australia of failing to combat antisemitism. It is the second deadliest mass shooting in Australian history, after the Port Arthur massacre in 1996, which prompted the government to introduce strict gun control laws.

In response, on 8 January 2026, the Australian government established the Royal Commission on Antisemitism and Social Cohesion, to examine the impact of antisemitism on the life of Jewish Australians and works to promote social cohesion. The final report is due by 31 December 2026. However, dozens of witnesses offering testimony at the Royal Commission were themselves targeted in a series of antisemitic harassment. Individuals have been arrested at the site of the attack for mimicking the actions of the attackers.

==== 2026 Islamic school principal investigation ====
In January 2026, Sheikh Abdulghani Albaf, the principal of New Madinah College, an Islamic school in the New South Wales Riverina region, voluntarily stood aside from his post while the NSW Education Authority (NESA) conducted an investigation concerning alleged antisemitic statements made on social media in previous months. The statements by Albaf on Facebook and Instagram contained political opinions about Israel, Zionism and the war in Gaza. In March, NESA's registration committee ruled Albaf did "not meet the fit and proper requirements" for being principal. Albaf took NESA and the education minister, Prue Car, to court over the ruling. The NSW Supreme Court ruled Albaf was not granted procedural fairness by NESA and its registration committee. The court set aside the NESA committee’s ruling. Albaf accepted that he had used "intemperate language" in some of his posts. He edited or removed the posts after concerns were raised.

==== 2026 Sydney Council event incident ====
An event booked with a Sydney Council venue received strong condemnation from Jewish community leaders for the use of its title which was alleged to be used to incite violence against Jewish Australians. The phrase was found by a state inquiry as an antisemitic call for violence. The event was planned for the first week of hearings at the Royal Commission on Antisemitism and Social Cohesion. The council had also previously been criticised for its response to antisemitism. Initially, the council allowed the event to go ahead. Subsequently, Mayor Clover Moore relented that the event would cause social division and presented a risk to public safety and ordered the cancellation of the event.

==== University of Sydney incidents ====
In 2024, the University of Sydney Vice-chancellor testified at a Parliamentary hearing on antisemitism at Australian universities and acknowledged that the university had been aware that Jewish students and staff had experienced antisemitism and cultural bias. In response the university made a number of changes to policies, procedures and practices. The national Jewish student union alleged that the university's response to the targeting of Jewish students had been inadequate.

In October 2025, on the Jewish holiday of Sukkot, an allegation was raised against a Sydney university lecturer for the verbal harassment of Jewish students marking the holiday. The incident led to the lecturer's suspension and later termination. The university apologsed to Jewish students and staff impacted by the incident. After the lecturer was arrested by NSW Police on stalking charges.

In September 2026, the naming of a University of Sydney's student election group drew condemnation from Jewish community groups, Jewish academics, the federal member for Wentworth, and the state premier over concerns of references to incitement of violence towards Jews. This prompted the university to review the process that allowed the name to be used. The incident was condemned the Executive Council of Australian Jewry, the Anglican and Catholic archbishops of Sydney, and by Sydney University's Vice Chancellor. The Sydney Catholic archbishop stated that following the terror attack at Bondi should have spurred the University of Sydney to make a stronger commitment to the protection and security of its Jewish students. The incident led to extensive coverage in Jewish community press and led to multiple investigations initiated by the university to ascertain the process that led to the use of hate speech in student elections. Among considerations raised was the prospect that the university would assume operational responsibility for student elections. The university later announced that the campaigners has manipulated the elcetion process to spread hateful messages that caused distress to the university community.

=== Other incident types ===
==== Public harassment and violence ====
Various incidents involving the public targeting of Australian Jews have occurred during this period. On 10 October 2023, several individuals in Melbourne made death threats against Jews, one group harassing a rabbi and his son, and another asking where to find Jews, saying they were "hunting for Jews". On 11 October 2023, a man in Bellevue Hill, New South Wales threatened to kill four Jewish teenagers in a car with an Israeli flag draped on it. He was later arrested and charged. In September 2024, a student at the Yesodei HaTorah College High School in Melbourne was assaulted in an unprovoked attack, in which one alleged attacker punched the student in the face and another reportedly filmed the incident. The victim's father said the victim sought assistance from bystanders but was ignored. In February 2025, several Jewish women were pelted with eggs in an antisemitic attack in the Bondi Beach area. NSW Police Strike Force Pearl determined the attackers targeted the Jewish women based on their manner of dress. Shortly after the attack, the alleged perpetrators crashed their vehicle in a nearby suburb and abandoned the car. In December 2025, shortly after the terrorist attack at Bondi, a rabbis car in Melbourne featuring a large menorah display was targeted in an arson attack.

==== Targeting of Jewish parliamentarians ====
Prior to 2023, Jewish parliamentarians from both Liberal and Labor parties have been targeted through in various minor incidents such as the use of antisemitic graffiti on campaign signs and minor vandalism of their offices. These incidents have taken place in 2018, 2019 and 2022. In 2021, the car tyres of a Jewish parliamentarian and those of his wife were slashed. In 2024, a significant firebombing incident occurred targeting the office of a Jewish Labor MP. In 2025, a campaign sign at the home of a Jewish MP was vandalised with antisemitic graffiti.

==== Sporting incidents ====
In May 2026, Australian news outlets reported that police were called to an under-12 girls’ netball match at Heffron Park in Maroubra, Sydney, after a middle aged woman allegedly made hateful remarks toward Jewish people present during a game between Maccabi Netball Club and Saints Netball Club. Footage of a confrontation circulated online and the woman was charged by NSW Police. Netball organisations and Jewish community leaders publicly condemned the incident. The incident was also condemned by Prime Minister Anthony Albanese. In March 2026, the AFL was referred to the Royal Commission on Antisemitism and Social Cohesion for a removing references to the Jewish community in a commemoration event following the Bondi massacre. In 2026, a thirteen-year-old girl in Melbourne was charged for multiple incidents involving the use of a vehicle to target or harm Jewish residents. In July 2026, two men were arrested for pointing a firearm at members of Chabad of Double Bay who were attending synagogue on Shabbat. NSW Police intervened and the firearm was discovered to be an imitation weapon. The Executive Council of Australian Jewry praised the police for the swift intervention.

==== Impacts on businesses and organisations ====
In October 2024, a popular Jewish owned bakery in Sydney was vandalised with antisemitic graffiti. In April 2026, an antisemitic arson attack took place with a firebombing of a billboard promoting a United Hatzalah event. In 2026, a Greek restaurant hosting a series of Jewish-Greek dinners was targeted with a bomb threat as well as a series of online harassment.

==== Public demonstrations and rallies ====
Antisemitism in the context of public demonstrations and rallies have involved various incidents. Some relate to far-right politics in Australia. On Saturday 8 November 2025, there was a neo-Nazis rally held by the National Socialist Network outside New South Wales Parliament in Sydney displaying a large antisemitic banner. The rally had prior approval from New South Wales Police despite the previous rallies from the group turning violent. The police were criticised for inconsistently applying laws prohibiting antisemitism at protests. During an anti-immigration March for Australia rally on 26 January 2026, a 31-year-old man was arrested and charged with inciting hatred after allegedly making antisemitic statements during an open-mic speech, and police reported the presence of individuals displaying extremist symbols at the event. The incident was cited in media reporting and public debate as part of broader concerns about the visibility of antisemitic rhetoric within far-right activity in Australia.

==== Disruptions to the Royal Commission ====
In May 2026, an elderly man wearing a shirt displaying a swastika outside the Royal Commission on Antisemitism and Social Cohesion was arrested. Other incidents targeting the witnesses presenting evidence at the Royal Commission have been presented to the Commission by the Dor Foundation.

==== Incidents involving political parties ====
In March 2026, the use of stickers promoting antisemitism in the style of the Tasmanian Greens received condemnation in the state's parliament. In August 2026, allegations were raised that antisemitism was rampant within the Australian Labor Party, with calls for the Royal Commission on Antisemitism and Social Cohesion to investigate the matter. The allegations were raised by senior figures associated with the Labor Party.

==== Other incidents ====
During this period, various incidents involved synagogues. On 10 and 11 January 2025, two synagogues in Sydney were targeted by vandals (see § 2000–2020s).

In January 2026, following the December 2025 attack on the Chabad of Bondi Hanukkah, a controversial article was published by author and illustrator Matt Chun justifying the attack. The incident was investigated by NSW Police. The incident also led to the widespread removal of his works from Dymocks, a popular chain of Australian book stores, and it also led the cancellation a book by Chun that was due to be published by University of Queensland Press.

In August 2026, the Royal Commission investigated an Islamic media company that received a social cohesion grant from the Department of Home Affairs and was alleged to have promoted antisemitic conspiracy theories.

=== Politics ===
Antisemitism and other forms of hostility to Jewish interests found in contemporary Australian politics is determined in part by Jewish advocacy organisations. In some instances, concern over political parties being positioned as hostile to Jews and Jewish concerns is viewed as arising from different ends of the political spectrum, such as the Australian Greens, a left-wing party, and One Nation, a right-wing party. The case of the Greens involves allegations that the party fostered antisemitism. Charges of antisemitism against the Greens appears to hinge in part upon their advocacy for the state of Palestine, criticism of the Israeli Netanyahu government's actions in Gaza and competing definitions of antisemitism. In the same month, the Australian prime minister, Anthony Albanese, criticised the Greens party for not sufficiently condemning the rise of antisemitism in Australia following the 7 October attacks. In 2024, Jewish members of the Greens have alleged that party leaders ignore internal efforts to ensure a response to antisemitism is incorporated in the party's anti-racism response, and to ensure that opposition against the policies of the Israeli government does not provide cover for antisemitic sentiment. Following the vandalism and attempted firebombing of the Newtown Synagogue in Sydney's Inner West in January 2025, the local mayor accused the Greens of fanning the flames of antisemitism. In 2026, the Greens leadership was criticised by Jewish leaders for rhetoric that was perceived to apply a loyalty test to support provided to the Jewish community. Jewish community advocates have pointed to the need for the Royal Commission to investigate the actions of the Labor Party in the aftermath of the sharp rise of antisemitism in Australia.

==== 2023 Jenny Leong incident ====
In a notable 2023 incident, Jenny Leong, a New South Wales Member of Parliament was condemned for her use of antisemitic language. At a Palestine Justice Movement forum in late 2023, Jenny Leong, Greens Member for the Electorate of Newtown in the NSW Legislative Assembly, launched the accusation that "the Jewish lobby and the Zionist lobby are infiltrating into every single aspect of what is ethnic community groups ... they rock up and they're part of the campaign and offer support for things like the campaign against the 18C racial discrimination laws, they offer solidarity, they rock up to every community event and meeting to offer that connection because their tentacles reach into the areas that try and influence power. We need to call that out and expose it." After condemnation of the remarks, Leong apologised for her statements. Australian Jewish press and community leaders described the incident as exposing Leong's use of a 'vile antisemitic slur' and criticised her attempt to minimise the incident. The pejorative term "tentacles" is reported to be historically associated with Nazi propaganda. Leong's comments were condemned by Australian prime minister Anthony Albanese. Jewish community members subsequently protested in front of Leong's office, with some protesters dressed as inflatable squids.

=== Royal Commission on Antisemitism and Social Cohesion ===
In response to the 2025 Bondi Beach shooting and the broader surge in antisemitism since the October 7 attacks, the Albanese government established the Royal Commission on Antisemitism and Social Cohesion on 9 January 2026 — the first royal commission in Australian history specifically dedicated to the issue of antisemitism. The commission is led by former High Court justice the Hon Virginia Bell AC SC. Prime Minister Anthony Albanese initially refused to establish a federal royal commission following the Bondi attack, instead announcing a departmental review led by former intelligence head Dennis Richardson. Following weeks of mounting pressure from victims' families, opposition leaders, Jewish community organisations, and over 60 prominent sports figures, Albanese reversed course on 8 January 2026. The New South Wales government, which had announced its own state royal commission, subsequently abandoned those plans in favour of the federal inquiry.

The commission received over 20,000 public submissions, more than any prior federal commission. An interim report released on 30 April 2026 made 14 recommendations to strengthen counter-terrorism responses — five of which remain classified — and cleared Australian authorities of direct failures to prevent the Bondi attack. It found however that counter-terrorism funding had significantly declined across the National Intelligence Community during a period when the threat to Jewish Australians was at its highest. Public hearings commenced in Sydney on 4 May 2026, with dozens of witnesses — many speaking anonymously — describing experiences including concealment of Jewish identity in public, antisemitism in schools, physical assaults, and lasting psychological trauma from the Bondi attack. The Executive Council of Australian Jewry recorded 2,062 antisemitic incidents between October 2023 and September 2024, a threefold increase on the prior year, which the commission is examining as part of its broader terms of reference. The commission's final report was originally due to be published on 14 December 2026. The commission was later granted a four day extension so as to allow the commemoration of the anniversary of the attack to occur independently.

== Attacks on synagogues ==
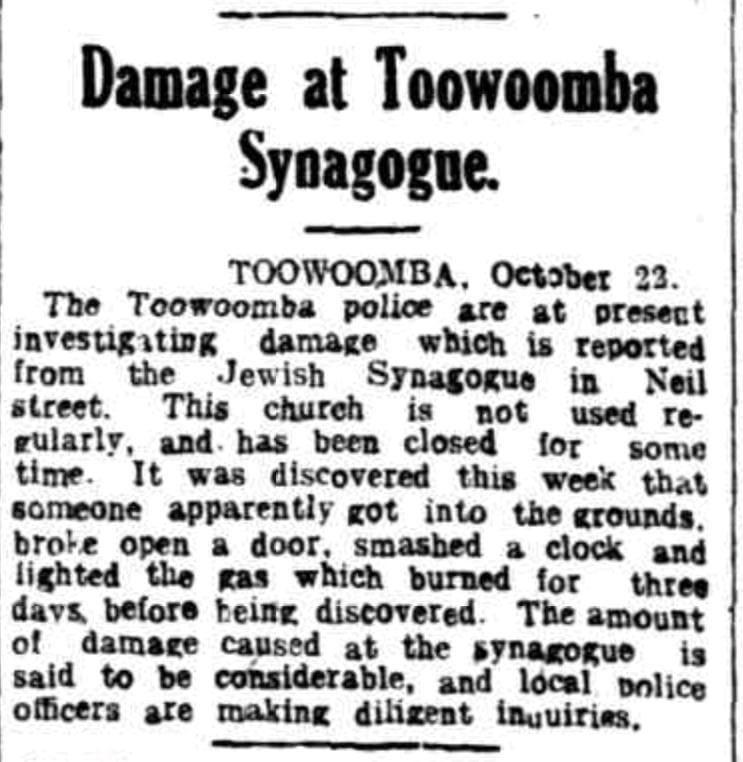
Toowoomba Synagogue arson attack (1920)

In Australia, attacks on synagogues have occurred from as early as 1920 (impacting the synagogue in Toowoomba, Queensland). Attacks on synagogues occurred with greater frequency from the 1990s onward.

=== Early incidents ===
- 1920 Toowoomba Synagogue attack – In 1920, an arson attack reportedly occurred at the Beth Yisrael Synagogue in Toowoomba, Queensland. The synagogue targeted in the arson attack was originally established in 1875. The attackers reportedly entered the synagogue property, breaking down one of the doors, smashed a clock, and lit a fire which burned for three days causing considerable damage. A 1941 studied noted that around this time Jews in the area struggled to make use of the synagogue for services and that the synagogue windows had been smashed by vandals. Vandalism and poor attendance of the synagogue later led to the synagogue to be sold to a Lutheran church.
- 1950 North Carlton Synagogue attack – In 1950, a North Carlton Synagogue and Talmud Torah were vandalised by local youths.
- 1961 Lubavitcher Synagogue attacks – In February 1961, the Lubavitcher Synagogue in St Kilda was burned down in a suspected arson attack. In September 1961, the glass doors of the Lubavitcher Synagogue in Bondi was destroyed by vandals in one incident, and windows were smashed in another incident.
- 1968 Carlton Synagogue attack – In 1968, the Carlton Synagogue, was attacked by vandals. The attack involved destruction of property, theft, and the desecration of holy books and ritual objects. Reportedly, the vandals smashes of all the synagogue windows, ripped the telephone wires, tore down the pulpit microphone, knocked over pews, and scattered prayer books and prayer shawls on the floor. The attackers also stole a carpet sweeper, a floor polisher, as well as brass and silver fittings. The synagogue president stated that it was the worst case of synagogue vandalism in Australia, and The Australian Jewish News criticised the general Australian media outlets for their insufficient coverage of the incident.
- 1976 Brisbane Synagogue attack – In 1976, the Brisbane Synagogue was burned down in a suspected arson attack.
- 1977 Sydney Great Synagogue attack – In 1977, the Great Synagogue in Sydney was targeted in an arson attack which damaged the synagogue doors. It was believed to be the first such incident to take place in New South Wales. Several days before the attack, obscene literature was placed inside the synagogue.
- 1981 Maroubra Synagogue attack – In 1981, the Maroubra Synagogue was set on fire, the synagogue hall was heavily damaged. The attack was suspected to be part of a series of anti-religious attacks against houses of worship in the area.
- 1984 Elwood Synagogue attack – In 1984, the Elwood Talmud Torah Congregation synagogue was extensively damaged in an arson attack.
- 1990 Melbourne synagogue attacks – In 1990, a series of at least five arson attacks occurred in March and April. The Kew Synagogue in Melbourne was targeted in two arson attacks. The first attack occurred in March and involved a brick smashing a window and four petrol bombs thrown inside, damaging the interior of the building. The second attack took place in April. The Caulfield Synagogue was also targeted in April with a petrol bomb damaging the exterior of the building. A second attempt to firebomb Caulfield Synagogue was made on the following night. The Mizrachi Synagogue was also targeted, but the attackers were frightened off by the synagogue caretaker. The Jewish community of Victoria called upon the state government to respond to the recent wave of anti-Jewish incidents, including the synagogue attacks. Other acts of vandalism and property damage against synagogues in Melbourne continued in the months that followed. The attacks also led to a response from Prime Minister Hawke who stated he would pursue new legislation to combat antisemitism.
- 1991 Sydney synagogue attacks – Synagogue attacks in 1991 includes a series of arson attacks on Sydney synagogues including on the North Shore Temple Emanuel in North Sydney. An arson attack targeted the Bankstown Synagogue in Western Sydney which resulted in the total destruction of the synagogue building. The Bankstown Jewish community had been active since the first decades of the 20th century and had first established a synagogue in 1914. The site was redeveloped and serves as a Uniting Church Aged Care facility. Several other synagogues in Sydney were also targeted by arsonists that year.
  - Other 1991 incidents – Synagogues in other cities also suffered from attacks in 1991. Bricks were thrown through a window at the Newcastle synagogue, and a bloodied pig's head was placed at the Brisbane synagogue.
- Other incidents in the 1990s – In 1993, on the anniversary of Kristallnacht, the Newtown synagogue, Sydney's second oldest synagogue, was subjected to an arson attack. In 1995, an arson attack took place on the Adass Israel synagogue in Glen Eira (in South East Melbourne). (In 2024, the same synagogue was firebombed, sustaining significant damage).

Other incidents include a 1990 attack where petrol bombs were thrown at a synagogue in Melbourne.

Attacks on synagogues and Jewish schools occurred through the 1990s and continued during the 2000s.

1991 Sydney synagogue attacks
Year	State	Local area	Synagogue	Date	Incident
1991	New South Wales	North Sydney	North Shore Temple Emanuel	28 January 1991	Arson
1991	New South Wales	Eastern Sydney	Sephardi Synagogue	26 February 1991	Arson
1991	New South Wales	Western Sydney	Bankstown Memorial Synagogue	5 March 1991	Arson
1991	New South Wales	North Sydney	North Shore Synagogue	12 March 1991	Arson (averted)
1991	New South Wales	South East Sydney	Illawarra Synagogue	28 March 1991	Arson

=== 2000–2020s ===
Between 2000 and 2023 (prior to 7 October, see below), synagogues across Australia were targeted in acts of vandalism or arson. Attacks have occurred in 2000 (Sydney, Canberra), 2001 (Canberra), 2002 (Melbourne, Sydney), 2004 (Perth), 2005 (Melbourne, Newcastle), 2006 (Sydney) 2008 (Melbourne, Sydney), 2010 (Perth), 2011 (Brisbane), 2016 (Sydney), 2018 (Canberra), 2019 (Brisbane), 2020 (Launceston), 2022 (Melbourne, Launceston), and 2023 (Maitland). Operation Shelter is a NSW Police operation aimed at preventing antisemitic and other hate-related incidents.

Other anti-Jewish incidents involving synagogues have come to public attention. In one case, in 2017, the likelihood of attacks on Australian synagogues led a NSW council to block the construction of a new synagogue over security concerns. In one instance, a public menorah, a large religious display placed in public, organised by a Melbourne synagogue was vandalised in December 2022.

Attacks on Australian synagogues 2000–2023 (pre-7 October 2023)
City	State	Years of Attack
Sydney	New South Wales	2000, 2002, 2006, 2008, 2016
Maitland	New South Wales	2023
Newcastle	New South Wales	2005
Melbourne	Victoria	2002, 2008, 2022
Brisbane	Queensland	2011, 2019
Canberra	Australian Capital Territory	2000, 2001, 2018
Perth	Western Australia	2004, 2010
Launceston	Tasmania	2020, 2022

Following 7 October 2023, antisemitic actions directed at synagogues continued. In an incident occurring on 8 October 2023, in New South Wales, two individuals walked past a synagogue and shouted "Allahu Akbar", before saying that they would "blow up the synagogue". On 11 October 2023, in Melbourne, a synagogue received a bomb threat. On 23 November 2023, in Western Australia, an individual threw two glasses of red paint at a synagogue. In December 2023, hoax bomb threats were made to several synagogues across Australia. On 25 November 2024, pro-Palestinian protesters targeted a Melbourne synagogue where a panel discussion was organised by the Australian Israel and Jewish Affairs Council (AIJAC). An altercation between protesters and counter-protesters led to the police restraining a man wearing a keffiyeh. On 26 November 2024, a Chabad synagogue in St Kilda, Melbourne was vandalised with pro-Palestinian and antisemitic graffiti. On 6 December 2024, an Orthodox synagogue in Melbourne was firebombed, destroying holy books and injuring one witness. Shortly after the attack, the Victorian premier, Jacinta Allan visited the synagogue site to condemn the incident and to announce funding to help cover rebuilding costs. Following the attack, Prime Minister Anthony Albanese stated that the attack was an act of terrorism, and later visited the site where he also faced hecklers. Additionally, in the wake of the synagogue attack, the Australian Federal Police (AFP) launched a specialised operation to investigate antisemitism in Australia. Prior to the attack, the synagogue had applied for security grants but was declined.

On 10 January 2025, one month after the establishment of the taskforce, the AFP stated that 124 cases were referred to the taskforce, with 102 selected for investigation. The targeting of Australian synagogues continued after the Melbourne firebombing incident with a synagogue in Southeast Sydney vandalised on 10 January 2025, and Newtown Synagogue in Sydney's Inner West was vandalised on 11 January 2025. The Newtown incident also involved an attempt to burn down the synagogue. By 23 January 2025, NSW Police arrested two men in connection to the Newtown Synagogue case.

In August 2025, Prime Minister Anthony Albanese announced that Iran and the Islamic Revolutionary Guard Corps (IRGC) were responsible for the attack on Lewis’ Continental Kitchen in Sydney and the synagogue attack in Melbourne. In response, he expelled the Iranian ambassador from the country and declared the IRGC as a terrorist organization.

On February 20, 2026, a 32-year-old man allegedly rammed a black pickup truck (Toyota Hilux ute) into the gates of the Brisbane Synagogue in Queensland, Australia. The ute involved in the incident knocked the gates down shortly after evening services, narrowly missing a congregant. Queensland Police charged Matthew De Campo with willful damage, serious vilification or hate crime, dangerous driving, and possession of a dangerous drug, treating it as a hate-motivated incident rather than terrorism.

== Response ==
=== Condemnations by Australian Prime Ministers ===
- In January 1960, Prime Minister Robert Menzies condemned recent manifestations of antisemitism in the country: "I think that I should now say that there is absolutely no room in Australia for anti-Semitism..."
- In 1972, Prime Minister William McMahon stated: "I say to you with all the sincerity of which I am capable: I will repudiate and reject any hint of anti-semitism as disgraceful and unworthy of any Australian. I have nothing but contempt for any Australian who would stoop to such statements or behaviour."
- In 1995, Prime Minister Paul Keating condemned an incident where dozens of Jewish graves in Adelaide were vandalised.
- In 2013, Prime Minister Julia Gillard signed the London Declaration on Combating Antisemitism and stated that antisemitism 'pollutes our world right now'.
- In a 2013 speech delivered by Malcolm Turnbull on an attack on a Jewish family in Sydney, described the importance of condemning antisemitism in Australia.
- In 2023, following the attacks conducted by Hamas on 7 October, Prime Minister Anthony Albanese and the majority of the Australian Parliament passed a motion concerning hate speech targeting Jews and others in Australia in the aftermath of the attack.
  - Shortly thereafter, six out of seven of Australia's living former prime ministers (John Howard, Kevin Rudd, Julia Gillard, Tony Abbott, Malcolm Turnbull, Scott Morrison) signed a statement against the rise of antisemitism in Australia in the wake of the attack and the threat to national cohesion, stating that "there is no more tenaciously evil race hatred than antisemitism". Howard, Gillard, and Albanese later appeared on a 2024 documentary Never Again: The Fight Against Anti-Semitism.
  - In the wake of continued antisemitic incidents in Sydney in November 2024, Prime Minister Anthony Albanese was criticised by the chief minister and president of Sydney's Great Synagogue and by former prime minister John Howard for perceived inefficiency in combatting antisemitism in Australia. Other criticisms soon followed. In January 2025, following Anthony Albanese's claim that his government did all that it could to combat the issue of antisemitism in Australia, the Executive Council of Australian Jewry, the peak Australian Jewish organisational body, criticised the Prime Minister for listing his achievements during a crisis where police action have fallen short in its enforcement of existing laws. The peak body called on the Prime Minister to convene a National Cabinet meeting to address the issue.

=== Jewish organisational efforts ===
In 1942, the Jewish Council to Combat Fascism and Anti-Semitism (JCCFAS), a Melbourne-based group, was founded to combat antisemitism and fascism. The group operated until 1970. In 1943, a group was formed in Western Australia dedicated to combating antisemitism. Another Jewish group based in Melbourne, known as Research Services, was formed in 1960 and operated until the 1970s. The group involved itself in gathering information on antisemitic activities in Australia. The group's members included Jewish ex-servicemen and ex-servicewomen. Since then, other Australian Jewish organisations have responded to antisemitism including the Executive Council of Australian Jewry (ECAJ) which produces annual incident reporting of antisemitism in Australia (starting from 1989), the Anti-Defamation Commission (ADC), which was originally formed by B'nai B'rith, and the Community Security Group (CSG). Jewish security groups have alerted Australian authorities regarding persons of interest. In 2019, the NSW branch of CSG alerted Australian counterterrorism officers regarding the radicalisation of one of the Bondi Beach attackers.

Other Jewish organisations approach the issue of antisemitism through educational programming such as Courage to Care (C2C) which focuses on upstander behaviour, and Moving Forward Together (MFT) which focuses on promoting harmony through multicultural activities. The Combat Antisemitism Movement (CAM), a US based organisation, branched out to Australia and continues to be active in Australia following the Bondi attack, organising and supporting various initiatives. Jewish communal organisations in Australia joined an international group known as J7 to coordinate community responses to antisemitism across diaspora Jewish communities.

In the 1940s, the Council of Christians and Jews initiated campaigns to combat antisemitism in Australian churches.

The Jewish community in South-East Queensland adopts varied responses to antisemitism, including education initiatives, interfaith dialogue, and security measures. These actions are framed as both protective and performative, aiming to assert Jewish identity within a multicultural framework.

Community experiences of and attitudes toward antisemitism have been reported on in community studies produced in partnership with Monash University's Australian Centre for Jewish Civilisation. Findings from a 2017 study include reporting that direct or personal experience of antisemitic insults and harassment over the last 12 months was experienced or witnessed by roughly one in ten respondents, with higher rates for Hasidic and Haredi Jews. In 2014, an increase in street incidents targeting Jewish Australians occurred and led to a Jewish centre building a bomb-resistant wall.

In the aftermath of the sharp rise of antisemitic incidents in Australia following 7 October 2023, Jewish communal organisations campaigned for the Australian government to create a position to oversee the response to antisemitism. in response, on 9 July 2024, Prime Minister Anthony Albanese appointed Jillian Segal, a former president of the ECAJ, as the special envoy on antisemitism to the Australian Government. In December 2025, Jewish community leaders in Australia and overseas advocated for the Australian government to establish a Royal Commission on antisemitism. Months later, after the commencementof the commission, reports emerged that Prime Minister Albanese and his cabinet had blocked requests for access to cabinet discussions requested by the commission, and the Prime Minister and cabinet made no submissions and declined to testify. Subsequently, Australian Jewish community leaders encouraged the Australian government to participate in a joint effort with the UK government to address recent antisemitism trends.

A local development following 7 October 2023, involved Jewish House, a Sydney-based non-profit organisation, partnering with Lifeline, a crisis support service, to document how antisemitic incidents, including the public support for the 7 October attacks, and other anti-Jewish incidents, invalidate the experiences Jewish community members, leading to increased anxiety and require culturally-specific responses from mental health support workers. Jewish House also created a dedicated resource website supporting practitioners with clients facing antisemitism. A response by Chabad of St Kilda to the 2024 antisemitic targeting of the home and property of the Chabad emissary family involved increased the number of public menorahs in Melbourne. Legal avenues to address antisemitism include a 2024 suit in Australian Federal court against an Islamic preacher in Sydney whose sermons are alleged to have incited hatred against Jews.

The Jewish sporting group, Maccabi, have organised multicultural sporting events where Jewish, Indigenous, Muslim, African and South Asian children play football together.

In May 2025, the Australian Academic Alliance Against Antisemitism (AAAAA), a network of academics and professionals from 32 Australian universities and medical centres, conducted research to assess the extent of antisemitism in Australian university settings, and the extent to which Australian universities actively ensure their campuses are free from antisemitism.

A working group of Australian Jewish psychiatrists developed a psychological model of antisemitic behaviours using case studies where defence mechanisms could be identified as playing a significant role in the acceptance of prejudicial attitudes and the reliance on misinformation.

Following the 2025 Bondi Beach shooting, the Jewish community of Victoria began conducting a community-wide review of security measures in place to safeguard Jewish institutions. The Western Australian Jewish community received additional security funding from the state government. And in New South Wales, after a review of the Bondi Beach attack emergency response, two Jewish organisations, the Community Security Group (CSG) and the Community Health Service (CHS) announced a merger would take place to help improve emergency preparedness. In Victoria, the Jewish community formed a united crisis management group, bringing together multiple communal organisations to prepare for future security crises. And NSW Jewish community leaders have advocated for the CSG to be permitted to carry weapons at outdoor events. Jewish groups called on the need for renewed interfaith dialogue between Jews and Muslims. Chabad leaders advocated for an increase in Jewish pride as a way to mitigate the effects of antisemitism in Australia.

In the aftermath of the Bondi Beach terror attack, Chabad rabbis helped launch the #OneMitzvahForBondi campaign encouraging all Australians to increase positive action. Community events in regional Australia were organised by Chabad to address combatting antisemitism. Chabad rabbis and have met regularly with government leaders to provide updates on the wellbeing of the Jewish community. A Chabad initiative, known as Project Noah, supported the staff of the Royal Commission with cultural training. A Chabad centre in Sydney launched a course for non-Jewish Australians to learn about Jewish values and their impact on the world.

The Victorian branch of the Community Security Group (CSG) established several community programs with the aim of empowering community members, institutions and volunteers.

Public pressure from Jewish Australians and others are presumed to have led to the extension of security hearings in the 2026 Royal Commission on Antisemitism in Australia.

=== Police efforts ===
Owing to security threats facing Jewish life in Australia, state and federal police have established operations and taskforces to combat the issue.

- Special Operation Avalite – In December 2024, a joint policing initiative was launched by the Australian Federal Police (AFP) and the Australian Security Intelligence Organisation (ASIO) to combat a rise in antisemitism in Australia.
- Operation Shelter – Following the surge in antisemitism that began in late 2023, the New South Wales Police established a rapid response unit to safeguard Jewish community sites. Following the 2025 Bondi Beach shooting, the unit was made permanent.
- Operation Park – From late 2023, the Victoria Police formed Operation Park to respond to hate incidents. The operation involved daily patrols of Jewish communal institutions. Approximately 70% of all incidents investigated targeted Jews and Jewish institutions. According to Victoria Police, incidents that have targeted the Jewish community have resulted in changes in approaches to policing.
- Strike Force Pearl – The New South Wales Police formed Strike Force Pearl in December 2024.
- Operation Jewish High Holy Days – In 2015, the New South Wales Police established Operation Jewish High Holy Days. Following the 2025 Bondi Beach shooting, the Royal Commission on Antisemitism and Social Cohesion recommended for the operation to be extended to other Jewish holidays.

In June 2026, the Australasian Rabbinical Association observed how in the immediate aftermath of the attack there was an increase of police protection of Jewish sites. However, within three months this protection was lessened creating security gaps. The Rabbinical Association argued that the standard police tactics were useful in preventing opportunistic attacks, but were likely insufficient in preventing terrorist incidents. Increased police protection of the Jewish community has been planned for significant events such as the anniversary of the Bondi terror attack.

=== Other community efforts ===
In 1989, following a number of racist and antisemitic incidents, a community group was formed, known as the Community Alert Against Racism and Violence (CAARAV), led by the Rev. Dorothy McMahon of the Pitt Street Uniting Church. The group's aims were to distribute published materials to counteract racist and neo-Nazi activity. The group was endorsed by religious leaders in the Jewish community. Other Christian groups who have mobilised resources to address antisemitism in Australia include the Australian Christian Lobby, Catholic Religious Australia, among others.

In 1997, the Australian Institute of Holocaust Studies (later renamed the Australian Institute for Holocaust and Genocide Studies (AIHGS)), sponsored the training of an Indigenous Australian scholar to travel to Israel to study the history of the Holocaust and antisemitism.

Antisemitism in Australia has also resulted in community organisations withdrawing from high profile public events. In 2026, the Jewish LGBTQIA+ association announced it would withdraw from the annual Mardi Grad parade due to concerns of antisemitic violence. The group had participated in annual parades for 26 years. Two years earlier, a group volunteer was injured by a protester. Shortly after the group's withdrawal, parade organisers removed the activist group that had been targeting the Jewish LGBTQIA+ association and the association rejoined the annual parade.

In July 2026, the Chabad community produced an event for healing from the Bondi Beach terror attack. Featured at the event were a Chabad author on emotional wellness and a musical performance from a Chabad cantor.

In 2026, following an incident involving students from a private school, Western Australia, Jewish community leaders reported they had observed an increase in antisemitism in recent years but they also reported active engagement and response from police and state education officials. Following the start of the Royal Commission into antisemitism, legal services for Jews and others providing statements were offered by Legal Aid WA.

=== University sector ===
Antisemitism on Australian university campuses has been reported over time. In 2026, following reports that Australian universities had been the site of increased antisemitism since 2023, university leadership have acknowledged that antisemitic acts have occurred on campuses and have pledged to address the issues. Within the Australian university sector, a major response to antisemitism has been developed by a specialised unit formed by Monash University. The Monash Initiative for Rapid Research into Antisemitism (MIRRA) was established as a project with Monash University's Australian Centre for Jewish Civilisation. MIRRA advances research on Australian antisemitism and works with industries to address areas of concern through specialised training. Other efforts have involved proposals that would see funding cuts or fines applied to universities that failed to address antisemitism.

Following the Bondi Beach terror attack, the Tertiary Education Quality and Standards Agency (TEQSA), developed standards for Australian universities to adopt and implement procedures relating to antisemitism in their institutions. Universities have been criticised for overuse of anonymity for those accused of antisemitic acts.

Other initiatives have been proposed by Professor Marcia Langton including using material from the 2017 National Aboriginal and Torres Strait Islander curricula project as a roadmap for educating Australian students on antisemitism. Langton had appeared before the Royal Commission on Antisemitism in August 2026 to relay her personal experience of harassment and intimidation by those who objected to her defense of Jewish Australians. Langton described to the commission how education could play a role in combatting Australian antisemitism. Langton stressed the need for education about racism not to be conducted with care so as not to traumatise vulnerable students.

=== Health sector ===
Research conducted by the Alliance Against Antisemitism in Healthcare of Australia examined impacts of antisemitism in Australian the health sector, including trends of Jewish medical students opting to hide their Jewish identity. In 2026, the Australian Health Practitioner Regulation Agency (AHPRA) supported research aimed at furthering understanding of the impacts of antisemitism in the Australian heath sector. Also in 2026, the president elect of the Royal Australian and New Zealand College of Psychiatrists (RANZCP) stood down over allegations of antisemitic statements shared via social media.

=== Legislative ===
In 2024, Australia outlawed the display of Nazi symbols. Prior to this legislation, similar laws were passed in New South Wales (2022), Victoria (2023), ACT (2023), South Australia (2023), Queensland (2024). Tasmania (2024). and Western Australia (2024). Notable cases involving the early application of these laws include the arrest of the owner of a prominent restaurant in Sydney.

In January 2025, Jillian Segal, the Australian Special Envoy to Combat Antisemitism, criticised lenient sentencing for antisemitic offences as a factor undermining efforts to address hate crimes against the Australian Jewish community, and called for mandatory sentencing for individuals attacking synagogues. Following an increase in attacks on synagogues and Jewish homes in the prior months, Segal called on Prime Minister Anthony Albanese and state premiers to convene a national cabinet meeting. She argued that urgent action is required to implement tougher sentencing guidelines and ensure more consistent prosecution of antisemitic hate crimes. In response, Anthony Albanese rejected both of Segal's requests, and stated that sentencing should be left to judges and that he would not need to convene a national cabinet as he discussed the matter with the premiers of Victoria and New South Wales. However, following an attack on a childcare centre in Sydney, calls for a national cabinet were renewed. The Prime Minister convened the national cabinet to discuss coordinating efforts to combat antisemitism. A key outcome of the meeting was the announcement of a national database to track antisemitic-related crime, incidents, and behaviours.

==== "All Zionists are terrorists" chant ====
In late February 2026, the Victorian Civil and Administrative Tribunal ruled that the chant "All Zionists are terrorists" constituted racial and religious vilification against the Jews. The Tribunal upheld a case filed by Melbourne Jewish community advocate Menachem Vorchheimer against pro-Palestinian activist and business owner Hash Tayeh regarding the use of the chant at a central Melbourne rally in May 2024. In March 2025, Victoria police charged Tayeh with four counts of "using insulting words in public" for his chants at the rally. The prosecution initially said the chant branded Jewish Australians as terrorists but later said it would not allege the chant was antisemitic.

==== Queensland Antisemitism Legislation ====
On 6 March 2026, the Queensland parliament passed the "Fighting Antisemitism and Keeping Guns out of the Hands of Terrorists and Criminals Amendment Act 2026" which banned two controversial pro-Palestinian chants as part of their combat against "antisemitism". Queensland become the first state to specifically prohibit the phrase "from the river to the sea", a slogan commonly used at pro-Palestinian rallies. The laws also outlawed the phrase "globalise the intifada", with anyone found using or displaying either slogan in a way that might reasonably be expected to cause a member of the public to feel menaced, harassed or offended, facing penalties of up to two years in jail.

==== Human Rights Commission ====
In August 2026, the outgoing Commissioner Lorraine Finlay apologised to the National Council of Jewish Women Australia (NCJWA) for her failure to speak out earlier and more clearly against what she saw as a rising tide of antisemitism, the "greatest regret" of her term. In September 2026, the Australian Human Rights Commission president, Hugh de Kretser, admitted that Jewish Australians were disappointed in his failure to swiftly and vehemently denounce the rise in antisemitism in Australia following the October 7 attacks.

==== Media regulations ====
Australian media regulator, Australian Communications and Media Authority (ACMA), has been faced with the dilemma of non-Australian media companies broadcasting content that incites hatred against Jews, leading to the recruitment of underage jihadists in Australia. ACMA regulates satellite services but not streaming content. ACMA has also sought to improve reporting processes to allow for more efficient review of alleged anti-Jewish content aired in Australian broadcasts.

In 2026, former ASIO head, Dennis Richardson, observed that general media coverage of antisemitic statements delivered by Muslim religious leaders in Australia received insufficient coverage. Richardson argued that the perceived need to reduce community tension must not reduce important public debate.

==== Education ====
In November 2026, it was announced that beginning in the upcoming school year, Australian students will be taught of the "evils of antisemitism and the horrors of the Holocaust."

=== Local government initiatives ===
In 2025, Waverley Council in New South Wales was the first Australian municipality to develop a strategy to counter antisemitism.

In 2026, the City of Glen Eira was the first Local Government Area (LGA) in the state of Victoria to adopt a dedicated local-government antisemitism strategy. The plan was adopted due to the high volume of anti-Jewish incidents taking place in the LGA. The municipality reported that 43% of all antisemitic incidents in Victoria took place in Glen Eira. More than 400 Jewish residents, community organisations, and individuals who have personally experienced antisemitism contributed to the strategy's development.

=== Reception of term and use ===
According to Sam Lipski, the term antisemitism in the Australian context refers to a variety of categories of behaviours. Each require a suitable response. Lipski identifies seven categories:

(1) Physically violent acts or threats directed against Jews, Jewish institutions and Jewish property; (2) verbal abuse against Jews in Jewish neighbourhoods; (3) political agitation on the fringe by extremist groups accompanied by the dissemination of propaganda literature and audio-visual material of the racist (anti-black, anti-Asian) and classic anti-semitic variety; (4) public expressions of hostility against Jews in the mainstream, church and ethnic media or in the mainstream ideas marketplace; (5) private or casual prejudicial statements against Jews, sometimes described as “ritual anti-semitism”; (6) acts of discrimination against Jews in the workplace; (7) acts of terrorism against Jews or Jewish property by anti-Israel elements.

— Sam Lipski, "Questions of anti-semitism", Australian Jewish News (9 November 1990)

According to the Queensland Jewish Board of Deputies, in their submission to the Royal Commission on Antisemitism and Social Cohesion, a distinct challenge in Australian responses to antisemitism is that it is often responded to using general anti-racism policies. The board has instead argued that antisemitism be treated as a distinct form of hatred.

According to the Dor Foundation, measuring antisemitic incidents is insufficient to aid understanding of the issue. General expressions, community perceptions, Jewish lived experience and other elements must also be assessed including beliefs and attitudes held by general population which may shape conditions for the expression of anti-Jewish hate.

The anti-Zionist Jewish advocacy group Jewish Council of Australia has criticised what it viewed as conflation of antisemitism with criticism of Israel. It accused some Israel supporters of "weaponising the Holocaust", and that in regards to pro-Palestine protests on university campuses, accusations of antisemitism are "being used to crack down on legitimate political expression and peaceful protests on campuses". In their submission to the Australian Senate regarding antisemitism at Australian universities, the group criticised proposed legislation as having "potential to create a hierarchy of categories of racism, exacerbate division, and undermine collaborative, multicultural, multi-faith efforts to tackle racism". Others, such as Professor Philip Mendes have argued that the council's views are the result of the opportunistic leveraging of a fringe minority of Jewish individuals used as tokenistic alibis for individuals and organisations opposed to Australian Jews. Other researchers argue that attacks on Jewish Australians, such as the 2025 Bondi Beach shooting, involve the murder of Jews while styling the action against "Zionists", reflecting how conflation of these topics on the part of perpetrators of violence produce deadly results. Other scholars argue that a generic term such as "groupism" is better suited to address the anti-Jewish actions and that the real challenge for Australia lies in its tendency to overlook deep-seated cultural tensions until a crisis occurs, which can lead the government to implement heavy-handed policy responses that risk reinforcing the very social divisions they aim to resolve.

In a 2026 Centre for Independent Studies research paper, Philip Mendes wrote that the National Tertiary Education Union opposed the IHRA definition of antisemitism and had not adopted measures to combat antisemitism. Mendes argued that organisations that lessen scrutiny of anti-Jewish discrimination weaken the overall reporting standards for all forms of prejudice.

== Memorials ==
Memorials for antisemitism in Australia include various public displays following the 2025 Bondi Beach shooting. A large floral display was preserved by the Sydney Jewish Museum for a future memorial. Waverley Council established a temporary memorial using a large solar powered Menorah sculpture. In June 2026, six months following the Bondi Beach shooting attack that targeted Australian Jews, the New South Wales Government announced that $2 million would be allocated to the construction of a permanent memorial for the victims of the attack.

Australia is also home to various memorials dedicated to the Jewish victims of antisemitic violence during the Holocaust.

In September 2026, the Cahill Park playground in Wolli Creek was dedicated in memory of the youngest victim of the Bondi terror attack. The playground dedication and renaming, originally announced in May, was made by the Bayside Local Government. Earlier in February, a community petition circulated to rename the Bondi Park playground where the attack took place. The petition garnered 22,000 signatures.

== Arts and culture ==
=== Film ===
- Revenge: Our Dad the Nazi Killer? (2023) – Documentary film exploring whether a Holocaust survivor hunted down and killed a Nazi living in Sydney.
- Never Again: The Fight Against Antisemitism (2024) — Documentary film by former MP Josh Frydenberg released on Sky News Australia, featuring Prime Ministers John Howard, Julia Gillard, and Anthony Albanese.
- Mezuzah Man (2026) – a short film on experiences of antisemitism in Australia. The filming of the documentary took place in the Bondi area.
- Bondi: Light Over Darkness and Bondi: Path to Terror (2026) – ABC Four Corners episodes.
- Bondi: A Timeline of Terror (2026) – a 90 minute documentary produced by Sky News Australia on the 2025 Bondi Beach shooting.
- Teaching Hate (2026) – an investigative documentary produced by the Sunday Telegraph on antisemitism in Australian universities.
- Wish You Long Life – A proposed film set for release in 2026 exploring Jewish life in Australia and the cost of keeping silent in the face of antisemitism.
- Cancelled (2026) – Documentary film by Danny Ben Moshe explores antisemitism in Australia after the October 7 attacks. The film focuses on the 2024 Australian Jewish doxxing incident.

=== Art exhibitions ===
- Holding Light exhibition – The Bondi Pavilion held an exhibition featuring works of Australian Jewish and other artists reflecting on the Bondi massacre. The exhibition was produced by Shalom Collective and Waverley Council. One work in the exhibition featured a Chabad rabbi injured in the attack while helping to treat a wounded police officer.
- Sharing Light exhibit – In August 2026, Waverley Council announced a public art project featuring 5,000 handmade clay vessels to commemorate the anniversary of the 2025 Bondi Beach terror attack.
- Goldstone Gallery (various exhibits) – The Goldstone Gallery was founded by artist and curator Nina Sanadze following the 2024 Australian Jewish doxxing incident. Exhibits covering themes of Australian antisemitism include an exhibit on the 2024 Melbourne synagogue attack. In her exhibit, Sanadze used chairs from the synagogue that had been salvaged in the aftermath of the attack.

=== Music ===
The musician Deborah Conway produced an autobiographical show addressing antisemitism in Australia.

In the aftermath of the December 2025 terror attack at Bondi Beach, community vigils played an adaptation of the Australian folk song Waltzing Matilda referencing the Hanukkah celebration that was targeted in the attack. The song was chosen after the name of the youngest victim who was herself named after the song. Local musicians produced a Hebrew/English song, Light Will Win, in tribute to the victims.

=== Other ===
- The Watchmaker's War (2025) – An Australian Jewish novel about a Holocaust survivor who hunts Nazis living in Australia.
- In 2026, at the Bondi Beach Sea Wall, a mural was commissioned in memory of the victims of the December 2025 terror attack at Bondi Beach.
- After Bondi: Survivor Stories (2026) – a podcast series on the attack at Bondi was produced by a psychologist who had aided in the crisis response.

== Gallery ==
Antisemitism in Australia
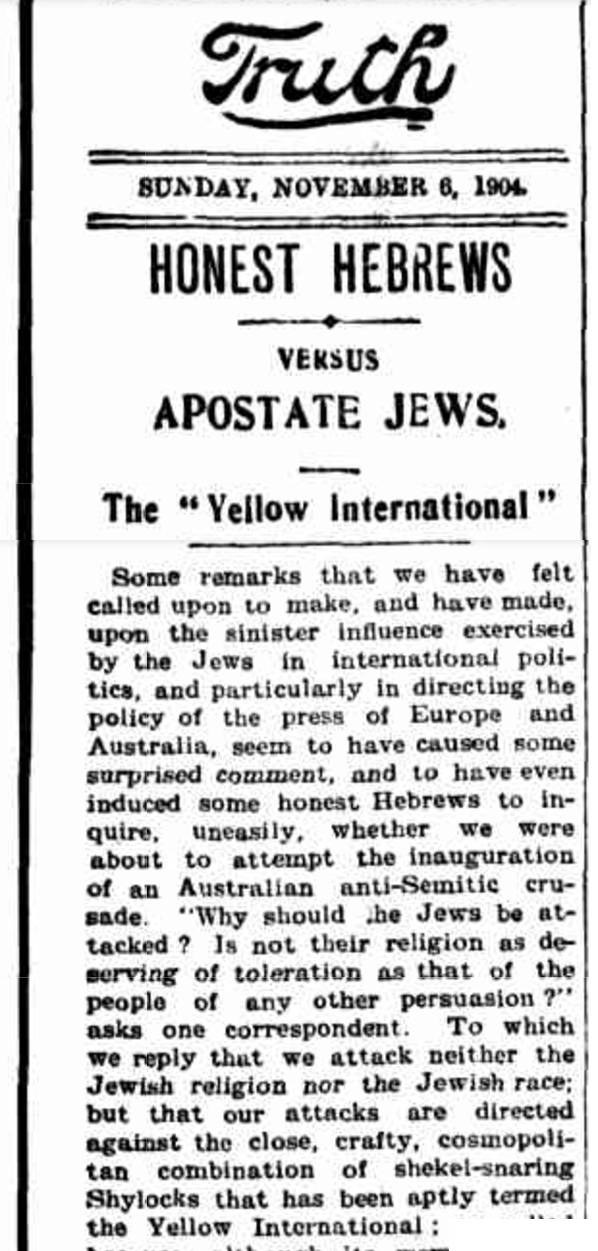
Antisemitic article in a Sydney tabloid (1904)

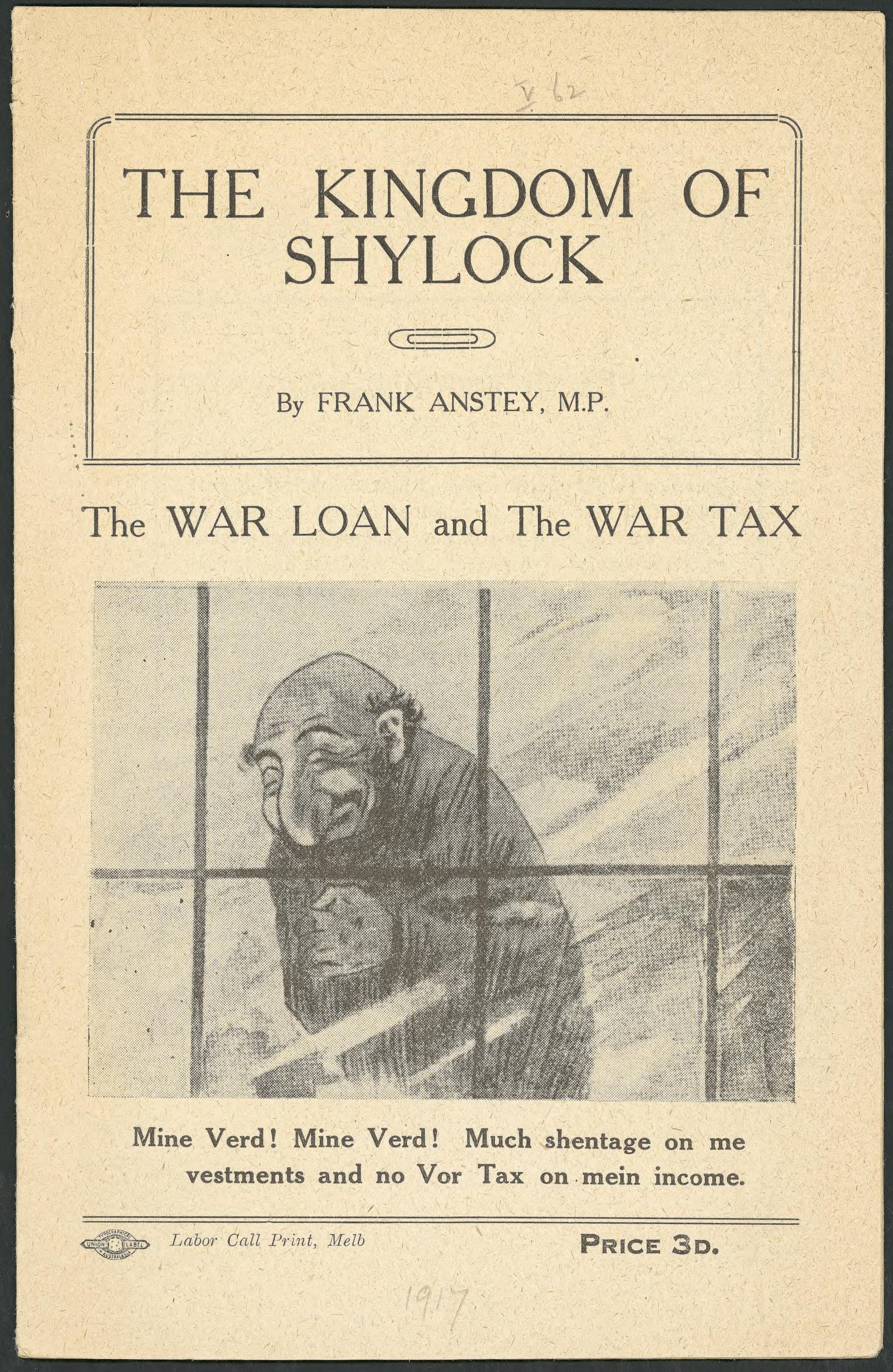
Pamphlet with antisemitic tropes by Australian Labor MP Frank Anstey (1915)

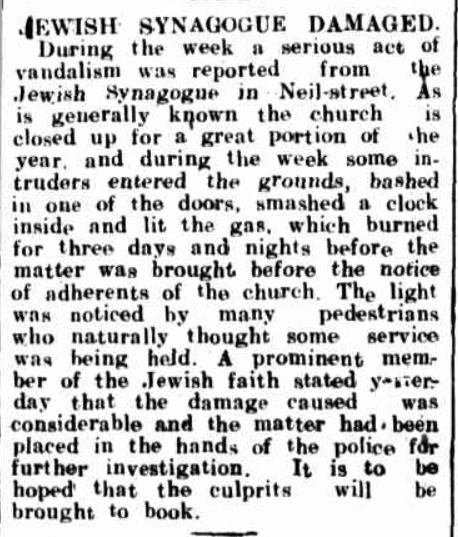
Report of an arson attack on the Toowoomba Synagogue (1920)

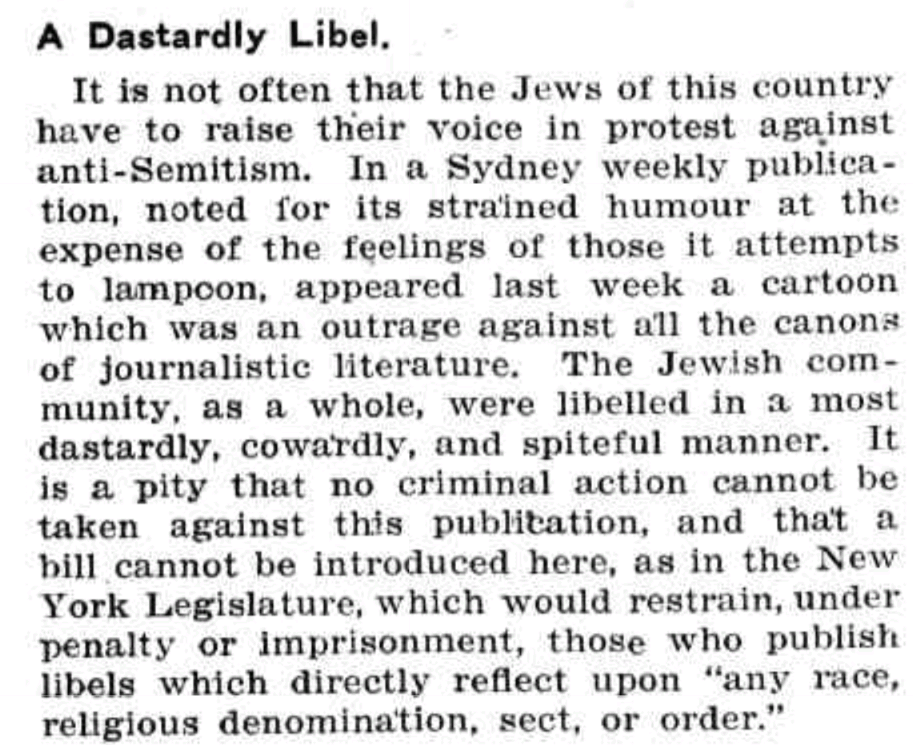
Short article on Australian antisemitism (1921)

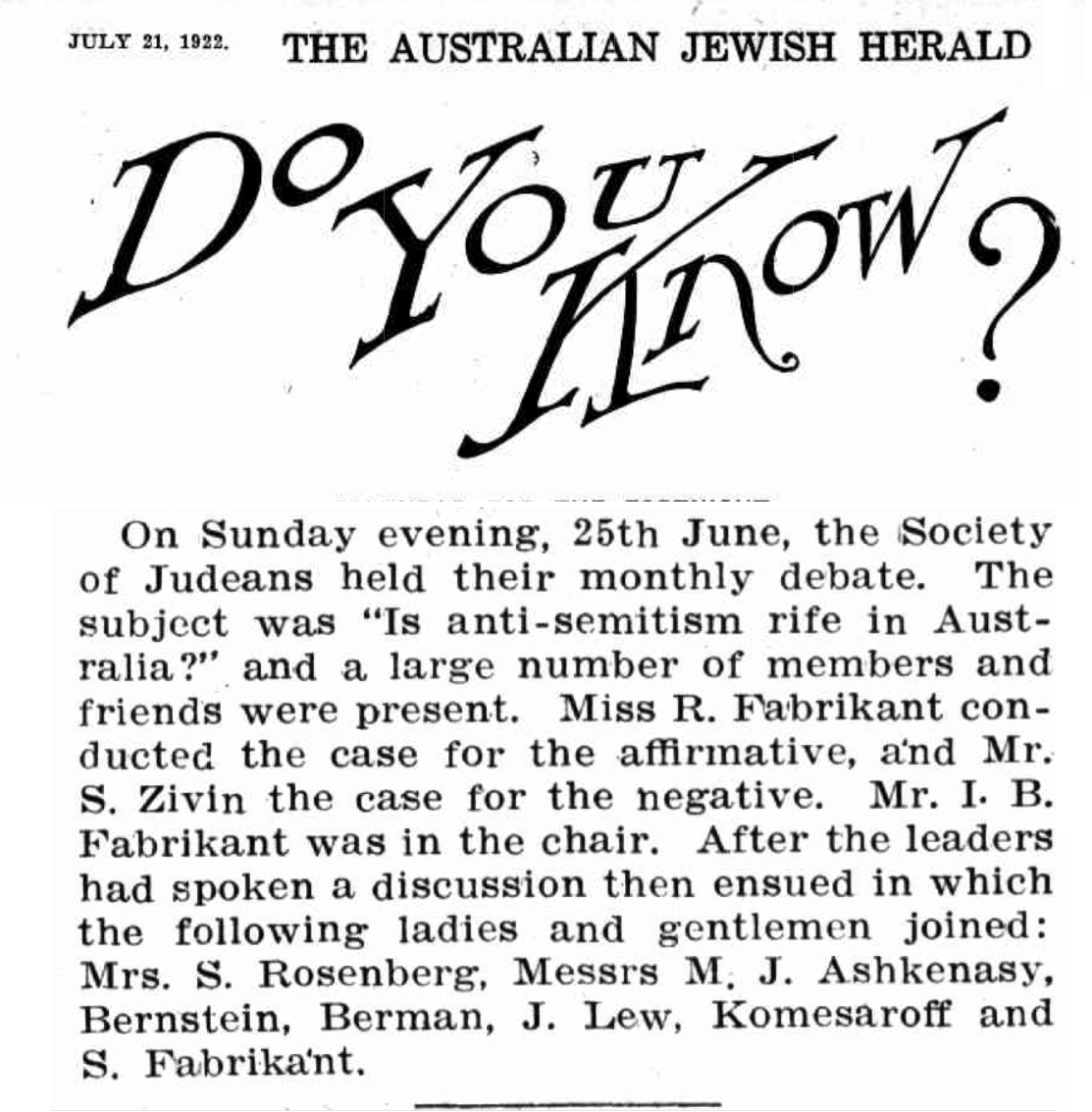
Jewish community debate over local antisemitism (1922)

== See also ==
- Antisemitism in New Zealand
- Antisemitism in Canada
- Antisemitism in South Africa
- Antisemitism in the United Kingdom
- Antisemitism in the United States
