= Strictly Jewish: The Secret World of Adass Israel =

2016 film by Danny Ben-Moshe

Strictly Jewish: The Secret World of Adass Israel is a 2016 Australian documentary film on the Haredi Jewish community in Melbourne, Australia. The documentary was directed by film-maker Danny Ben-Moshe, and aired on the SBS Australian television channel as part of its "Untold Australia" series.

The film centers on the Adass Israel community in Melbourne which is described as a Haredi Jewish "sect". The format of the film follows three community members who explain their faith and way of life.

== See also ==
- Welcome to the Waks Family
- A Life Apart: Hasidism in America
- 2024 Melbourne synagogue attack, arson attack on Adass Israel Synagogue, in Ripponlea, Melbourne.
