= 2024 J.E.W.I.S.H creatives and academics doxxing incident =

Doxxing of Jewish Australians

A mass doxxing incident targeted a private WhatsApp group called 'J.E.W.I.S.H creatives and academics' on 8 February 2024. Pro-Palestine and anti-Zionist activists leaked the chat transcript and contact details of over 600 Australian Jewish creatives and academics in the group, after the group organised a letter writing campaign to the Australian Broadcasting Corporation (ABC) and the federal government to have journalist Antoinette Lattouf fired due to her previous criticisms of Israel's actions during the Gaza war. After Lattouf was dismissed from the ABC, the group continued to discuss ways to pressure the employers of other pro-Palestinian activists whose activities they felt crossed the line into antisemitism.

Politicians and Jewish community leaders described the leak as motivated by antisemitism and a desire to target Australian Jews, while others defended it as a form of whistleblowing. After the leak, group members received personal threats and attacks on their places of work, which led the Australian government to make changes to Australian law regarding doxxing.

== Overview ==
In the wake of the October 7 attacks in 2023, a private WhatsApp group for Australian Jews called 'J.E.W.I.S.H creatives and academics' was created. At the time of the doxxing, it had 600 members. In December 2023, certain members of the J.E.W.I.S.H creatives and academics group and another group Lawyers for Israel participated in an organised letter writing campaign, encouraging the Australian Broadcasting Corporation (ABC) to terminate the employment of Antoinette Lattouf due to her criticisms of Israel's actions during the Gaza war, and an article she co-wrote which questioned the veracity of miscaptioned videos released by the Australian Jewish Association claiming protesters in Sydney were chanting "gas the Jews". A forensic investigation by the New South Wales Police Force later confirmed the protesters had not said "gas the Jews" but instead "where's the Jews" and "f*** the Jews". The two groups encouraged members to write to the head of ABC and the government's Communication Minister, with one stating that it was important lawyers were involved in the writing efforts so it was perceived as a legal threat by ABC and the government. After Lattouf's employment was terminated, members celebrated her dismissal in the group chats, and several stated they received personal emails from ABC Chair Ita Buttrose thanking them for their emails and confirming Lattouf's employment had ceased.

On 8 February 2024, it was reported pro-Palestinian and anti-Zionist activists had doxxed the group, by sharing the full transcript of the group chat, which totalled around 900 pages, and including the full names, occupations and the photographs of around 100 members of the group. The leakers stated they redacted home addresses, phone numbers, and emails of members of the group, and that no private photos or photos of children were shared. Supporters of the doxxing defended it in the context of the Gaza war, stating that people in the leaked chat had themselves sought to intimidate pro-Palestinian activists; The leakers, who referred to the group as the "Zio600" and a "Zionist group chat", stated that the leak was made on the grounds the group was conspiring against pro-Palestinian public figures including discussing ways to jeopardise their employment, stating they "were shocked and disturbed by the contents of the transcript [and] the tactics discussed to target and harm the livelihood and reputation of good and just people, some for simply being Palestinian." Several high-profile public figures shared the material on social media, including the children's artist Matt Chun, Macquarie University academic Randa Abdel-Fattah, and writer Clementine Ford. Ford had been among the pro-Palestinian activists targeted by some members of the group, and cited this as her reason for sharing the details, stating that the fact the group members were Jewish was "utterly irrelevant" to the leak.

Reportedly, only a minority of the members of the group discussed campaigns against pro-Palestinian figures, and Jews who did not identify as Zionists or considered themselves anti-Zionists reported they were also doxxed. One subject stated that she had never been part of the group but was nonetheless doxxed, stating: "I am not a Zionist, I have never been a Zionist, I am just a Jewish woman trying to go about my life. This is a group of any Jew they know the name of. I can't believe it is happening.” Following the doxxing, members of the group faced threats, including threats made against a five-year-old child, with one family reportedly being forced into hiding.

In August 2024, the source of the leak was identified as New York Times journalist Natasha Frost. Frost stated that she had shared the contents of the WhatsApp chat with a single individual about whom she was writing a story in confidence, and that she was "shocked" at its subsequent dissemination, saying the leak put her and many others at risk and that she "deeply regret[ted]" the fact that it had been made public. In November 2024, the first arrest related to the leak was made.

== Reactions ==
When the WhatsApp chat messages were leaked and the involvement of the J.E.W.I.S.H and Lawyers for Israel groups in having Lattouf dismissed was known, there was a large backlash from the ABC staff union. The global affairs editor John Lyons stated he was "embarrassed to work for the ABC" after finding out how the executives had been manipulated by the groups. The 200 members of staff that arrived at the organized union meeting put forward a vote of no confidence toward ABC head David Anderson. The staff union also presented a list of demands and warned they would be having a walkout if it was not met. The board of directors formed their own meeting afterwards, releasing a unanimous supporting message of Anderson as head.

The leak was condemned by leaders of Australia's Jewish community, including Alex Ryvchin, the co-CEO for the Executive Council of Australian Jewry, the peak body for Australian Jews. Ryvchin said he was in "shock ...[and] disbelief" that "people are once again drawing up lists of Jews", calling the tactics "Nazi-like". The NSW Jewish Board of Deputies condemned the leak. Both the governing Australian Labor Party and the opposition Liberal Party of Australia were strongly critical of the publication of the list. Prime Minister Anthony Albanese stated that "[t]he idea that someone should be targeted because of their religion ... is just completely unacceptable". Other politicians such as Liberal Party Senator Dave Sharma, Jewish Australian Labor Party MP Josh Burns and independent MPs Allegra Spender and Zoe Daniel also condemned the publication of the list.

=== Other responses ===
Indigenous Australian academic Marcia Langton criticised the "ongoing persecution" suffered by members of the leaked group. Conversely, Simon Copland wrote in The Conversation that what occurred "was more in line with whistleblowing, not dox[x]ing", and malicious intent was not clear. Also writing for The Conversation, Hugh Breakey commented on ethical issues regarding sharing the names of all the people in group as only some had targeted pro-Palestinian activists, though stating that revealing the WhatsApp group's activities could be in the public interest, as they "made pro-Palestinian creatives fear their careers were unfairly jeopardised".

=== Changes to legislation ===
In February 2024, Prime Minister Anthony Albanese directed Attorney-General Mark Dreyfus to bring forward new laws in response to the Privacy Act review in response to the mass doxxing. The Albanese government shortly thereafter announced new laws to combat doxxing, with tougher laws to stop the malicious release of personal information. The Privacy and Other Legislation Amendment Act 2024 took effect on 10 December 2024 and introduced several new offences to the federal Criminal Code Act of 1995, introducing criminal penalties for doxxing. The Act also amends the Privacy Act 1988 and 6 other Acts to introduce measures to protect the privacy of individuals personal information, including expanding the Information Commissioner's powers and the requirement of the development of a Children's Online Privacy Code.

== See also ==
- Antisemitism in Australia
- Antisemitism during the Gaza war
