= Armed Response Command =

New South Wales Police Force rapid response firearms unit

- Active: 1 November 2026 - present
- Country: Australia
- Agency: New South Wales Police Force
- Type: Rapid firearms response
- Role: Counter-terrorism; Public safety
- Operations jurisdiction: Sydney
- Abbreviation: ARC

Structure
- Sworn officers: Approx. 100 (as of 1 Nov 2026)
- Unsworn officers: Intelligence analysts and support staff

Commanders
- Current commander: Detective Superintendent Andrew Evans

Equipment
- Vehicles: 24

The Armed Response Command (ARC) is a rapid firearms response unit of the New South Wales Police Force formed on 1 November 2026 to respond to threats, patrol high-risk areas, protect places of worship and major events in Sydney that was established in the aftermath of the Bondi Beach shooting in December 2025.

The ARC will initially operate alongside Operation Shelter, which was established in October 2023 in response to heightened community tensions, including a rise in antisemitic and Islamophobic incidents. As the ARC assumes greater operational responsibility, Operation Shelter will gradually scale down as the ARC builds its staffing and operational capability.

The ARC has a dedicated operations centre, a 24/7 intelligence room supporting officers on the ground with real-time information, threat assessments and deployment coordination. By 2028, the ARC will have a full strength of 250 police officers and 28 civilian intelligence analysts and support staff. The NSW Government has invested A$94.3 million to establish the ARC.

== Background ==
Operation Shelter was established by the New South Wales Police Force in October 2023 following heightened community tensions and an increase in attacks on Australian Jews after the October 7 attacks in Israel and associated protests. Since its establishment, the operation has involved deployments to several locations, including houses of worship, transport centers, and other crowded public areas, with the aim of enhancing community safety and reassurance.

The NSW Police Force launched Operation Shelter in light of the October 7 attacks in Israel, after the Sydney Opera House sails were illuminated in the colours of the Israeli flag, drawing a crowd of pro-Palestinian demonstrators. NSW Police Force Acting Commissioner David Hudson APM stated that public safety is the police's top priority as Operation Shelter was launched. The operation was established to enhance the NSW Police Force's handling of future protests by creating an operation focused on increasing community safety during such events. Senior officers said at the time that the operation was intended to gather intelligence on and monitor potential protests planned in response to the Israel–Gaza war. Operation Shelter Commander Assistant Commissioner Stephen Hegarty said the operation's priority is to guarantee that the Jewish community and the general public is safe and backed.

The operation is designed to coordinate intelligence gathering, increase visible police presence, and reduce antisemitic and other hate-related incidents, particularly around Jewish community sites and crowded public locations. It has involved proactive patrols, monitoring of protest activity, and targeted interventions to reassure at-risk communities and deter potential hate crimes against Jewish Australians. Police announced that resourcing for Operation Shelter will be returned to its highest level following anti-Israel vandalism at Woollahra in December 2024. The operation was significantly reinforced in December 2025 in response to a terrorist attack at a Jewish festival on Bondi Beach, focusing on protecting Jewish Australians and preventing further violence.

== Operations ==
On 10 January 2025, a synagogue at Allawah in southern Sydney was defaced with swastikas and other antisemitic graffiti, including the phrase “Hitler on top” sprayed across its exterior walls. Premier Chris Minns condemned the incident as a “monstrous” act of hatred, while police launched a hate-crime investigation under Operation Shelter.

After the Bondi Beach terror attack on 14 December 2025, Operation Shelter was expanded, with additional resources and operational support deployed. The high-visibility operation currently includes public-place patrols and proactive taskings, supported by officers from the Central Metropolitan, South West Metropolitan and North West Metropolitan Regions, as well as specialist units including the Public Order and Riot Squad, State Protection Group, PolAir, Traffic and Highway Patrol Command, Marine Area Command, Rescue and Bomb Disposal Unit, and the Dog Squad. Since the Bondi Beach attack, Operation Shelter had completed 751 taskings. As part of the operation, police conducted regular patrols at locations assessed as high risk – Sydney's eastern suburbs, including Bondi, which has a large Jewish community, are a particular focus of these activities.

Under Operation Shelter, 328 police officers were deployed on 15 December 2025 across suburbs with significant Jewish populations. In the days after the attack, PolAir helicopters patrolled the attack site and other areas of the eastern suburbs as part of Operation Shelter. Under Operation Arques, the NSW Joint Counter Terrorism Team charged the Bondi shooter after his arrest at his hospital bed on 15 December 2025.

Following the attack, police carried out more than 2,600 operational taskings across over 3,200 shifts. Among subsequent incidents, a 20-year-old man was charged after allegedly posting a call to action on social media encouraging protesters to gather at a beach in southern Sydney, with the alleged intent to incite violence. He was charged with using a carriage service to menace, harass or offend, and with publicly threatening violence on the grounds of race or religion. Since the establishment of Operation Shelter, 18 individuals have been charged with a total of 34 offences in connection with the operation.

== Training and equipment ==
In January 2026, senior NSW Police Force officers travelled to Germany and the United Kingdom to study best practice in overseas police units.

ARC officers are trained in rifle proficiency with the Australian Combat Assault Rifle (ACAR), active armed offender response, advanced driver training and tactical medical care. The ARC is equipped with a fleet of 24 specifically modified rapid-response vehicles including BMW X5s and Toyota Land Cruisers fitted with secure firearm storage for their rifles.

== See also ==
- Terrorism in Australia
- Crime in Sydney
- Antisemitism during the Gaza war
