= Jewish House =

Australian charitable organisation

Jewish House is an Australian-Jewish non-profit organisation assisting homeless people. It is based in the Eastern Suburbs of Sydney. The organisation was founded in 1986 by local businessmen Roger and Anthony Clifford. The Clifford brothers established the crisis centre to respond to the needs of those community members struggling with substance abuse issues.

== Crisis accommodation centre ==
The organisation operates a crisis accommodation centre which operates on a 14-night stay system. During this period, homeless clients receive intensive psycho-social support services and support to navigate their way through the welfare system.

== People ==
Rabbi Mendel Kastel is the organisation's CEO. Rabbi Kastel is a NSW Police chaplain, and a supporter of a "managed alcohol" approach to alcohol addiction.
