= Jewish Council of Australia =

Australian advocacy organisation

- Formation: 2024
- Purpose: Representation for non-Zionist Australian Jews; Support of Palestinian freedom and justice; Opposition to antisemitism and racism
- Headquarters: Melbourne, Australia
- Executive officer: Sarah Schwartz
- Website: www.jewishcouncil.com.au

The Jewish Council of Australia (JCA) is a progressive Australian Jewish advocacy organisation founded in early 2024. It was founded to represent anti-Zionist Australian Jews, support Palestinian causes, and oppose antisemitism and racism. The JCA, which does not claim to represent all Australian Jews, is led by human-rights lawyer Sarah Schwartz. Its views have been opposed by the Executive Council of Australian Jewry (ECAJ).

== Background ==
The JCA was founded as an Australian Jewish advocacy organisation in late 2023 or early 2024 by self-described progressive Jews. It took its name from the Jewish Council to Combat Fascism and Anti-Semitism, a left-wing 1940s organisation that represented Australian Jews and was "the official political link between the Jewish community and the general public", founded by the father of the co-founder of the JCA, Max Kaiser. The JCA was formed to represent anti-Zionist Australian Jews; support Palestinian causes; oppose antisemitism and racism; and to dispute smears against the pro-Palestinian movement, suggesting that criticism of Israel is in itself antisemitic.

Co-founder Max Kaiser said that the JCA was founded "as an independent expert body of scholars, lawyers, writers, and teachers focusing on the issue of antisemitism and racism and advocating for a cease-fire", as "a response to the political situation we found ourselves in after October 7. Established Jewish organizations were pushing a narrative... that conflated 'Jews' with 'Israel'. In this narrative, legitimate anti-Israel criticism is portrayed as somehow antisemitic and an attack on Jewish people — particularly when it comes from Palestinians".

== Governance ==
As of March 2026 the organisation is led by the executive officer, human rights lawyer Sarah Schwartz. Bart Shteinman and Ohad Kozminsky are executive members, while the advisory committee includes Louise Adler, Naama Blatman, Na’ama Carlin, Michael Edwards, Sophia Kagan, Max Kaiser, and Aviva Tuffield.

== Positions ==
The organisation was founded on the premise that the existing Jewish bodies insufficiently represented the diversity of Jewish viewpoints regarding criticism of Israel and its positions vis-a-vis the Palestinians. The JCA's position is that it will combat far-right antisemitism and neo-Nazism.

The Jewish Council opposes Australia's legislating the International Holocaust Remembrance Alliance's (IHRA) definition of antisemitism. It has criticised what it classifies as conflation of criticism of Israel with antisemitism. In February 2024, it criticised speakers at a rally in support of Israel for "weaponising the Holocaust" and treating criticism of Israel as antisemitic, and in May 2024 stated that claims of antisemitism were "being used to crack down on legitimate political expression and peaceful protests on campuses" in relation to pro-Palestinian protests on university campuses.

== Political activities ==
In May 2024, the organisation stated their support for Labor Senator Fatima Payman when she described the Gaza war as a genocide. The Jewish Council also criticised the Albanese government for appointing Jillian Segal as special envoy on antisemitism, stating that she would be unable to differentiate between criticism of Israel and antisemitism. In September 2024, the organisation gave evidence to a Senate inquiry on antisemitism at Australian universities, stating their opposition to the Coalition's proposed legislation relating to antisemitism on campuses. In the written submission, the organisation opposed the bill as "to establish a Commission of Inquiry into Antisemitism considering its potential to create a hierarchy of categories of racism, exacerbate division, and undermine collaborative, multicultural, multi-faith efforts to tackle racism".

JCA executive officer Sarah Schwartz gave a presentation in January 2025 at an anti-racism symposium comedy event at Queensland University of Technology (QUT). One of her presentation slides, titled "Dutton's Jew", was intended to ridicule the "imaginary conception of Jewish people" held by Opposition leader Peter Dutton and the Coalition, who in her view were using "Jews and the Jewish community as political footballs to push a rightwing political agenda". The ECAJ and NSW Jewish Board of Deputies criticised the slide, and Education Minister Jason Clare called on the university to enforce its code of conduct. After the Anti-Defamation Commission also criticised the slide, Schwartz responded that the backlash to her presentation was the result of a smear campaign by "the Murdoch press and pro-Israel lobby groups". In February, QUT commissioned former Federal Court judge John Middleton to review the event. He found that the slides "were not antisemitic in nature nor were they offensive to those actually present at the debate", and that the presentations, in context of the purpose of the debate, was aligned with the university's standards. He was critical of News Corp's reporting of the event.

Following the 2025 Bondi Beach shooting, the JCA criticised the government's move for tougher gun laws and banning the display of terrorist symbols. The JCA also published an online petition calling upon Prime Minister Anthony Albanese, NSW Premier Chris Minns, and all Australian leaders to stand against "those who are weaponising the Bondi massacre to push bigotry, hatred and division", stating "Pitting Jewish safety against Palestinians, Muslims and migrant communities, and eroding all of our civil liberties, doesn't make Jews safer. It makes the real fight against antisemitism harder". By 28 December, the petition had attracted 37,391 signatures.

In early February 2026, the JCA, along with the Australian National Imams Council and the Belgium-based Hind Rajab Foundation, co-signed a submission to the Australian Government requesting to ban Israeli President Isaac Herzog from visiting the country, and a criminal investigation set up under the Commonwealth criminal code. The JCA stated that the visit from Herzog, who is scheduled to visit the site of the Bondi Beach shooting, was using Jewish pain as a political prop. On 9 February, the JCA published a full-page advertisement in The Sydney Morning Herald and The Age titled "Jews Say No! to Israeli President Herzog", listing around a thousand names of Jews who had signed their letter stating "We, the undersigned Australian Jews, say Israeli President Herzog does not speak for us and is not welcome here". Social media users found that four of the names on the list were hoaxes or fake names, including an insult in Hebrew and the names of three Nazi collaborators.

== Reception ==
In July 2024, the ECAJ described the JCA as "far-left" and "a micro-group which represents only a thin sliver of opinion on the far-left margins of the Australian Jewish community", following the JCA labelling the ECAJ as a "right-wing Zionist group". The JCA stated in response that the organisation does not claim to be representative of all Australian Jews.

== See also ==
- Australian Jewish Association, a conservative Jewish advocacy group founded in 2017
- Independent Australian Jewish Voices (2007–2017?)
