= Jillian Segal =

Australian lawyer and business executive

Jillian Segal AO

1st Special Envoy to Combat Antisemitism in Australia
- Incumbent
- Assumed office 9 July 2024
- Appointed by: Anthony Albanese

Personal details
- Born: 5 November 1955 (age 71)
- Education: University of New South Wales; Harvard Law School

Jillian Shirley Segal (born 5 November 1955) is a South African–born Australian lawyer, business executive and Australia's Special Envoy to Combat Antisemitism.

She previously served as the president of the Executive Council of Australian Jewry.

== Early life and education ==
Jillian Shirley Segal was born in Johannesburg, South Africa, on 5 November 1955. She is Jewish.

On moving to Sydney in 1970, she completed her education at Kambala School in 1973.

She then graduated from the University of New South Wales with a BA/LLB and won the University Medal in Law in 1979. Segal received a Master of Laws from Harvard Law School.

== Career ==
Segal's first job was associate to Sir Anthony Mason, judge in the High Court of Australia. She joined Allen, Allen and Hemsley as a senior associate and was promoted to partner, before leaving to serve as a commissioner and subsequently deputy chair of the Australian Securities and Investments Commission (ASIC).

After completion of her five-year term at ASIC, she was a member of the Dawson Review into the Trade Practices Act.

=== Non-executive positions ===
Since 2003 she has occupied a number of non-executive roles, including positions on a variety of corporate and government advisory boards.

From 2003 to 2015 she was on the board of the Australian Securities Exchange and from 2004 to 2016 on the board of the National Australia Bank. She served on the Council of the Australian War Memorial from 2014 to 2017 and was deputy chancellor of the University of New South Wales from 2010 to 2019.

In 2008 Segal was appointed chair of the General Sir John Monash Foundation, that administers the John Monash Scholarships. She has served on the board of the Sydney Opera House Trust, and as of 2022 was a community representative on the Council for the Order of Australia. She has been a board member of the Garvan Institute since 2009.

Segal is a past president of the Executive Council of Australian Jewry.

=== Special Envoy to Combat Antisemitism and controversies ===
Segal has long been an advocate for Israel in Australia. In November 2023, she co-signed a statement condemning foreign minister Penny Wong and the Labor party for calling on Israel to "cease the attacking of hospitals", and its support for a UN resolution calling for a ceasefire. She was chair of the Australia-Israel Chamber of Commerce until March 2025.

On 9 July 2024, Segal was appointed for a term of three years Special Envoy to Combat Antisemitism to the Australian Government by Prime Minister Anthony Albanese, a new position created to combat what the government described as growing antisemitism in Australia since the Gaza-Israel war. The appointment came after campaigning by Jewish communal organisations to create a position to fight the rise in antisemitism following the attacks by Hamas on 7 October 2023. The United States government began applying diplomatic pressure on the Australia to create an antisemitism envoy position in May 2024. Segal's appointment was praised by the Executive Council of Australian Jewry, the representative body of Jews in Australia, and received support from the federal Coalition. The Jewish Council of Australia, a community group formed in February 2024 critical of the State of Israel, opposed Segal's appointment. Segal's statements and positions on antisemitism in Australia allege that antisemitism at universities had become 'systemic'.

In January 2025, Segal criticised lenient sentencing for antisemitic offences as a factor undermining efforts to address hate crimes against the Australian Jewish community, and called for mandatory imprisonment for individuals attacking synagogues. Following an increase in attacks on synagogues and Jewish homes in the prior months, Segal called on Albanese and state premiers to convene a national cabinet meeting. She argued that urgent action is required to implement tougher sentencing guidelines and ensure more consistent prosecution of antisemitic hate crimes. In response, Albanese rejected both of Segal's requests, and stated that sentencing should be left to judges and that he would not need to convene a national cabinet as he discussed the matter with the premiers of Victoria and New South Wales.

In July 2025, Segal recommended she become a monitor of media organisations, with the ability to "readily terminate" funding for public institutions, such as universities, festivals and public broadcasters, if they fail to combat antisemitism. A judicial inquiry would be established into antisemitism at universities by the start of 2026 if the envoy determined matters had remained unaddressed.

Segal did not comment on known Nazis prominently attending a protest march in Melbourne on 31 August 2025, and did not issue a public statement regarding a neo-Nazi protest on 8 November 2025 outside the Parliament of New South Wales in Sydney, during which protesters displayed a banner attacking the "Jewish lobby". When questioned by David Shoebridge during Australian Senate estimates, Segal confirmed she had not released a formal public statement, stating that she had instead provided background statements to individual journalists upon request.

In October 2026, Segal suggested that visitors to Australia should be screened for the "risk of holding anti-Semitic views", insinuating that "new technological capabilities" to vet travellers to Australia. Her report further asked that public arts organisations should be empowered to impose "enforceable conditions" on artists and revoke grants if they promoted what they deemed "anti-Semitic". The Jewish Council of Australia (JCA) condemned Segal's recommendations, writing how her suggestions were "Trumpian", and argued how they were ideologically-driven roadmap curtailing freedom of expression, academic rights, and democratic freedom. The executive officer of JCA further stated that Segal does not speak for all Jews, and that her recommendations would entail many Jews being misclassified as "progressive anti-Semites" themselves.

== Recognition and honours ==
Segal was appointed a Member of the Order of Australia in the 2005 Queen's Birthday Honours for "service to business law in Australia, particularly in the areas of financial services reform and market regulation, and to the community through a range of organisations".

She was promoted to Officer of the Order of Australia in the 2019 Australia Day Honours, for "distinguished service to the banking and financial regulation sectors, to not-for-profit organisations, and to women".

== Her family trust's donations to Advance ==
In the 2023–24 financial year, her and her husband's family trust, operating through a trustee company, Henroth Investments Pty Ltd, made a AU$50,000 donation to the conservative political lobby group Advance. Advance featured as one of the most prominent voices lobbying against the 2023 Indigenous Voice to Parliament referendum, claimed that the presence of Palestinians in Australia was a "risk to security", and accused left-wing politicians of being sympathetic to Hamas.

Henroth Investments is directed by Segal's husband and his brother Stanley. News website The Klaxon reported on the donation in July 2025, suggesting that Segal and her husband were major funders of Advance. Segal denied being involved in the donation and said that she regarded the activities of her husband as separate from her own.

== See also ==
- List of combating antisemitism envoys
