= Betty Robbins =

American singer

Betty Robbins (born Berta Abramson, April 9, 1924 – February 19, 2004) was a notable cantor. She was one of the first female cantors. She was the first woman appointed as a cantor in the 20th century.

== Career ==
Robbins began singing while in 1932 at the age of 8 while living in Poland. She was not allowed to sing in the all-male choir in synagogue and instead sat opposite the boys and sang so loudly the cantor relented. She cut her hair short to fit in and later was the soloist in the choir of the German synagogue in Danzig, Poland for six years prior to fleeing the Nazis.

Robbins is sometimes reported to be the first female cantor, although the unofficial cantor Julie Rosewald preceded her. Robbins was appointed cantor of the Reform Temple Avodah in Oceanside, New York, in 1955, when she was 31 and the temple was without a cantor for the High Holidays.

Her appointment was reported on the front page of The New York Times. In addition to her cantorial work, Robbins taught religious education at the Sinai Reform Temple in Bay Shore, Long Island and later in Lake Worth, Florida, where she also continued to serve as a cantor.

== Personal life ==
Robbins was born in Kavala, Greece in 1924 and moved with her family to Poland when she was four years old. Robbins attended cheder in Poland, defying a rabbi who refused to let her in at first but then allowed her to attend if she sat behind a curtain in the hallway. In 1939, Robbins and her parents left Poland due to the Nazi invasion and immigrated to Australia because Sydney sounded Jewish to Robbins' father, the Russian born Samuel Abramson.

She married a member of the United States Air Force named Sheldon Robbins, who she met at a Temple Emanuel dance while he was on leave from his New Guinea base. They married in a civil ceremony in Mackay, Queensland, on September 18, 1943 and in a religious ceremony at the Brisbane Hebrew Congregation on October 25, 1943. On August 8, 1944, Robbins immigrated to the United States.

Robbins' older brother Moishe Abramson left the family while they were still living in Poland to move to Palestine. Her son, Steven Blue Robbins, teaches at the Fowler College of Business at San Diego State University.
