= History of the Jews in Tasmania =

Jewish populations have existed in most of the history of settled Tasmania, Australia. 376 people in Tasmania listed Judaism as their religion in the 2021 Australian census. Most live in the capital city of Hobart with a smaller population in Launceston.

== History ==
The first Jews in Tasmania, were convicts, mostly from East London. Two Jews named Judah and Joseph Solomon, were two brothers sentenced for death, because they promoted crime in England in 1819. Eventually, their sentences got commuted, and were deported to Tasmania. They eventually opened a general store which would sell imported goods.

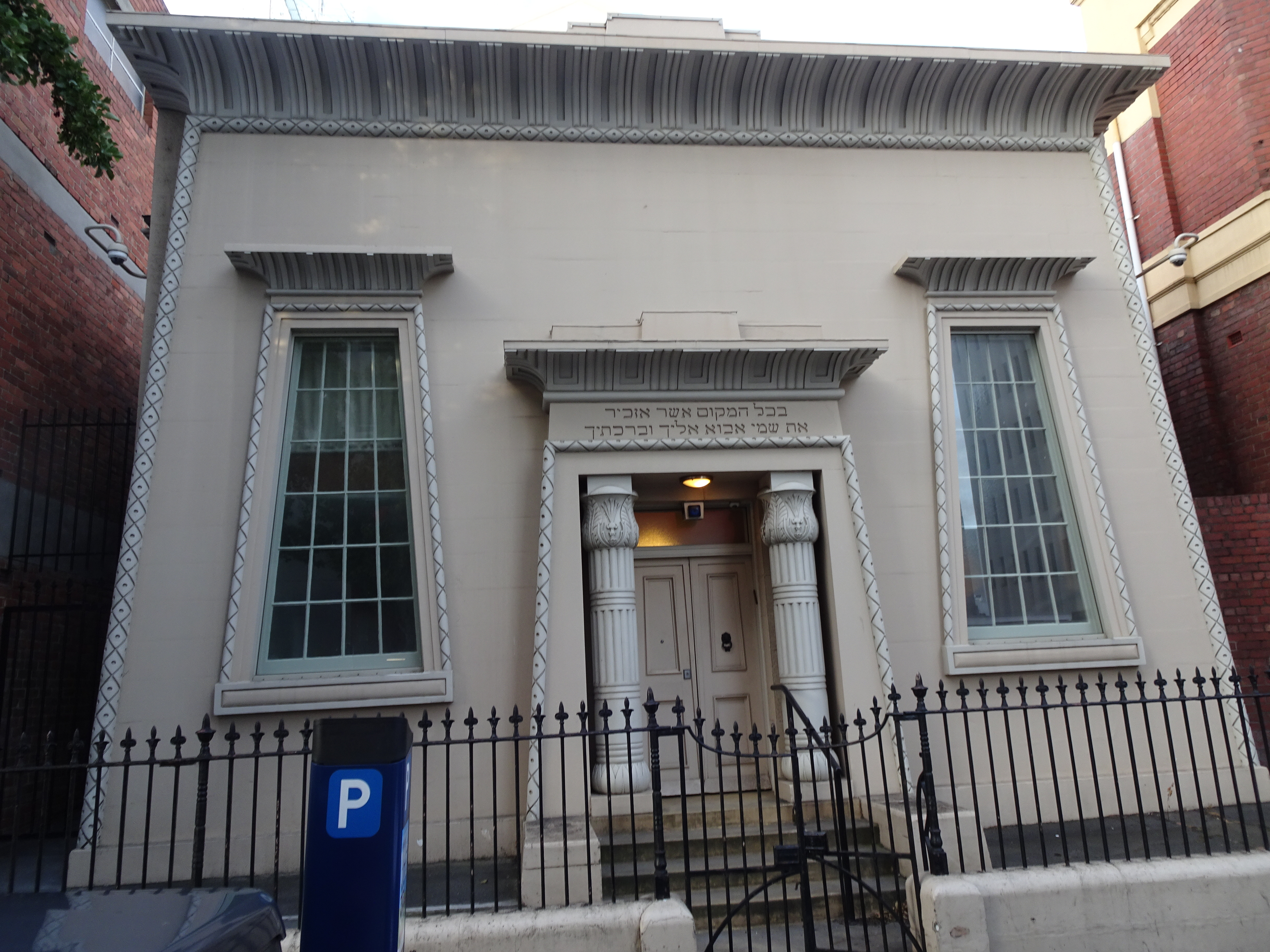
Hobart Synagogue

After the brothers were given freedom from their servitude, they built a house on Argyle and Liverpool streets and services were conducted there before the construction of the Hobart Synagogue.

Increasingly, Tasmania has been the choice for many Australians when choosing a place in Australia to live. The same is said about Australia's Jewish population. Due to low prices in Tasmania, as compared to larger Australian cities like Melbourne, Sydney, Perth, and Canberra, many Jews have decided to settle in Tasmania.

== Problems ==
Due to local fishery laws, the local Jews could not legally import canned Schmaltz Herrings until recently. There are two synagogues in Tasmania, The Launceston Synagogue, and the Hobart Synagogue. The Chabad Synagogue in Launceston has a rabbi, Yochanan, who lives there with his wife Rochel and son.

== Proposals for a Jewish state ==
Part of Southern Tasmania, was considered as a proposal for a Jewish state. Critchley Parker, a young journalist visited the Tasmanian nature and officially proposed it to be a home for the Jewish state. He met up with Isaac Steinburg, who stated he could fit 50,000 Jewish refugees, in a part of Tasmania, known as Kimberly. After hiking the land for a long while, Parker and his associates began to believe that Kimberly could be an adequate place to house at least some of Europe's Jewish refugees from the Holocaust. Eventually, Parker began to show signs of fatigue from exploring and eventually died in 1944.
