= Melbourne Hebrew Congregation =

Jewish Congregation in Australia

Melbourne Hebrew Congregation Toorak Shule
- Hebrew: ק"ק שארית ישראל
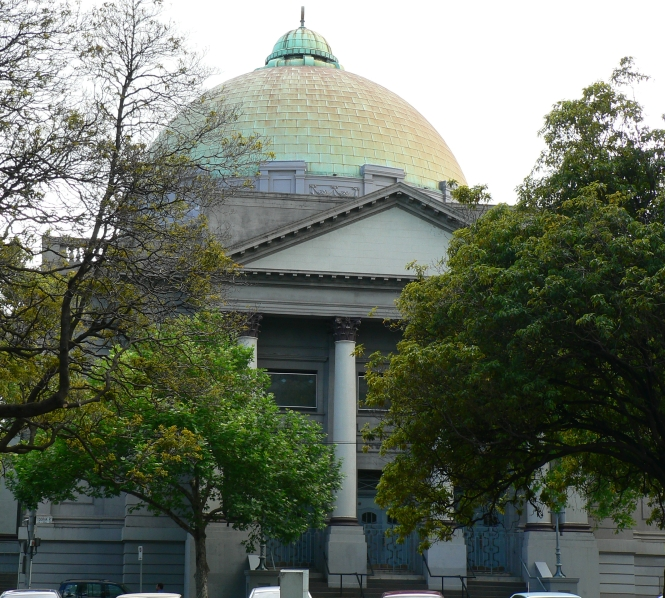
- Melbourne Synagogue, pictured in 2006

- Location in South Yarra, Melbourne

Religion
- Affiliation: Modern Orthodox Judaism
- Ecclesiastical or organizational status: Synagogue
- Status: Active

Location
- Location: Toorak Road, South Yarra, Melbourne, Victoria
- Country: Australia
- Interactive map of Melbourne Hebrew Congregation; Toorak Shule
- Administration: Melbourne Hebrew Congregation
- Coordinates: 37°50′11″S 144°58′36″E

Architecture
- Type: Synagogue architecture
- Style: Neoclassical
- Established: 1841 (as a congregation)
- Completed: 1847 (Bourke Street); 1930 (South Yarra)
- Capacity: 1,300

Website
- www.melbournesynagogue.org.au

The Melbourne Hebrew Congregation (Hebrew: ק"ק שארית ישראל), or Toorak Shule, is the oldest Jewish congregation in Melbourne, Victoria, Australia. Formed in 1841, the congregation was originally located on Bourke Street before moving in 1930 to Toorak Road, South Yarra.

== History ==
The first Jews in Melbourne arrived around the time of the city's founding in 1835. Jewish High Holiday services were first held in 1839, and in 1841 the Melbourne Hebrew Congregation was formed. The congregation's first synagogue building, located at 472 Bourke Street, was erected in 1847, with a seating capacity of 100. Reverend Moses Rintel arrived to serve as the congregation's rabbi. After a number of disputes, however, Rev Rintel left the congregation in 1857 and formed the East Melbourne Hebrew Congregation. He was replaced by Rev EM Myers, who was followed by Rev WI Marks and Rev AF Ornstein.

The 1850s saw the arrival of some 300 Jewish families from London and the Province of Posen, Prussia to Melbourne, prompting the construction of a new larger synagogue on the Bourke Street site. Benefactor David Benjamin laid the foundation stone of the 650-seat building in March, 1855. The synagogue was re-consecrated in 1877, at which time Rabbi Dattner Jacobson was appointed rabbi. In 1883 he was succeeded by Rabbi Joseph Abrahams, who went on to serve the congregation for some forty years. Notable members during this period included Sir Benjamin Benjamin, the Hon Edward Cohen, and Ephraim Zox. In 1891 the congregation celebrated the marriage of John and Hannah Victoria Monash.

Raphael Benjamin was assistant rabbi and reader of the congregation from 1874 to 1882.

In 1923 Rabbi Abrahams was succeeded by Rabbi Israel Brodie, who later became chief rabbi of the British Commonwealth. In 1930 the congregation moved to Toorak Road, South Yarra, to the newly completed classical style 1300-seat synagogue, designed by Nahum Barnet. In October 1932 the congregation celebrated the Bar Mitzvah of Zelman Cowen, who later became Governor-General of Australia. In April 1937 Rabbi Brodie returned to England, and in August 1938 Rabbi Harry Freedman succeeded him. Following World War II the synagogue had a full membership for the first time in its history. In December 1947 Rabbi Hugo Stransky was appointed rabbi. In February the following year the congregation conducted the funeral service of Sir Isaac Isaacs, the first Australian-born Governor-General. Rabbi Izaak Rapaport was appointed rabbi in September, 1952.

The congregation today enjoys a large and diverse membership with its chief minister, Rabbi Shlomo Nathanson.

== See also ==
- List of synagogues in Australia
- History of the Jews in Australia
- Oldest synagogues in the world
