= 1990 Melbourne synagogue attacks =

Series of arson attacks on Australian synagogues in 1990

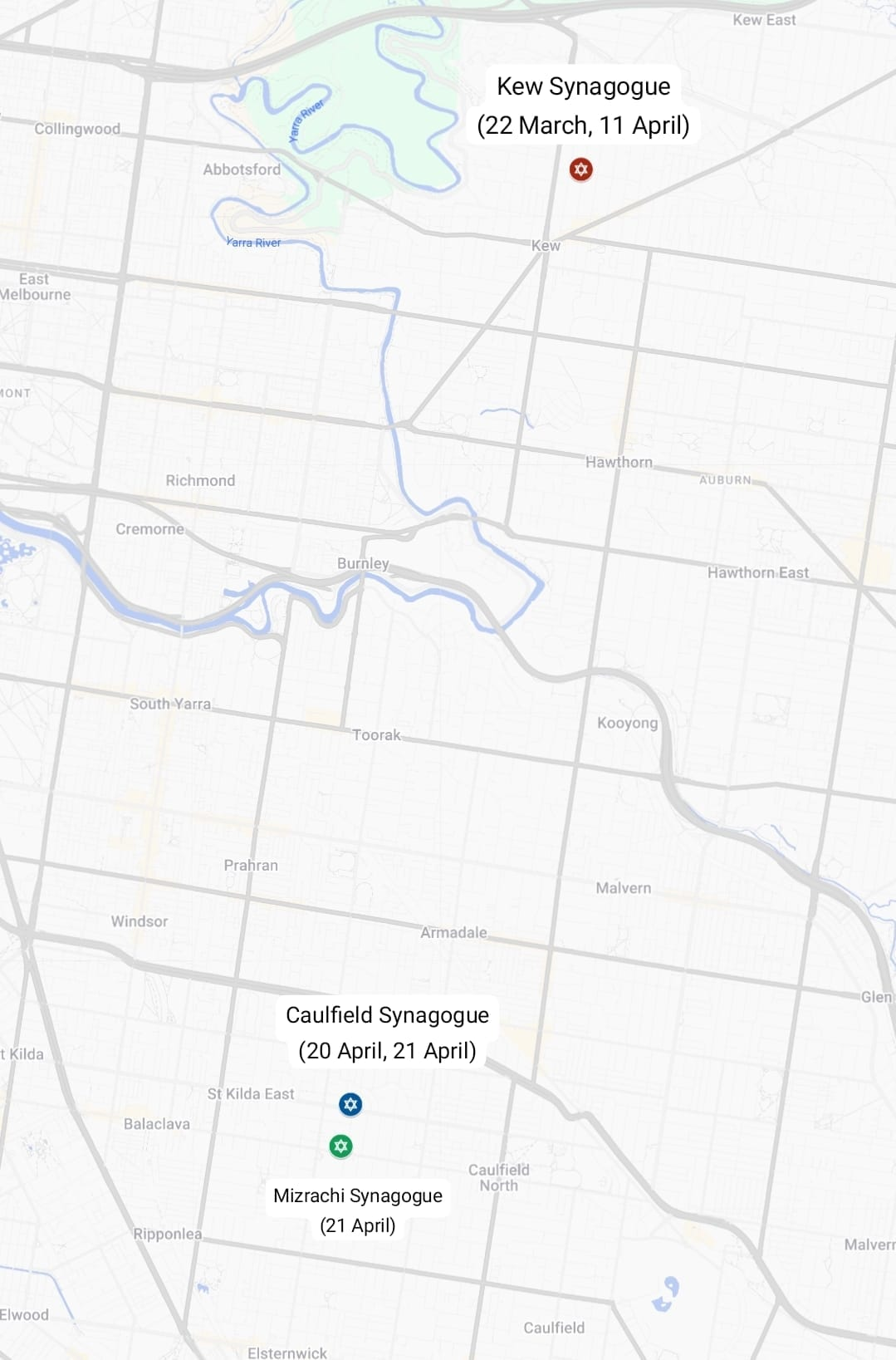
- Map of the 1990 Melbourne synagogue attacks
- Location: Melbourne, Australia
- Date: 22 March 1990 to 21 April 1990 (AEDT; UTC+11:00)
- Target: Three synagogue buildings
- Attack type: Arson attack
- Weapon: Petrol
- Deaths: 0
- Injuries: 0
- Perpetrator: Unknown perpetrators
- Kew Synagogue damaged on two occasions Caulfield Synagogue damaged on occasions Mizrachi synagogue attackers repelled

The 1990 Melbourne synagogue attacks was a series of five arson attacks targeting the Australian Jewish community in Melbourne. Between March and April 1990, synagogues were targeted in a series of firebombing incidents. Other vandalism incidents targeting local synagogues followed later that year.

== Background ==
In the 1970s and 1980s, the Jewish community in Australia experienced various attacks on community institutions and centres including a series of letterbombs targeting Jewish community leaders in the 1970s, the 1976 burning of the Brisbane Synagogue, the 1982 bombing of a Jewish centre in Bondi, among other attacks. Shortly before the 1990 wave of synagogue attacks, in November 1989, three synagogues in Melbourne were vandalised with various antisemitic slogans and slurs. Other attacks on synagogues across the Jewish diaspora were known to have taken place in the preceding years. And other incidents targeting synagogues in other Australian cities took place in the early months of 1990, including in Sydney, Newcastle, Perth, Brisbane, and Adelaide.

Incidents in Melbourne immediately preceding the attack include the Adass Israel Synagogue being daubed with anti-Jewish slogans in February 1990. Synagogue officials were joined by non-Jewish neighbours to clean and repaint the walls. And in January 1990, one young man had been fined for a recent daubing of a Melbourne synagogue.

== Overview of attacks ==
The main attacks targeted the Kew Synagogue, Caulfield Synagogue, and Mizrachi Synagogue, taking place in March and April 1990.

The Kew Synagogue in Melbourne, founded in 1949, was targeted in two arson attacks. The first attack occurred on 22 March between midnight and 8:30AM, and involved a brick smashing a window in the synagogue hall and four petrol bombs thrown inside, damaging the interior of the building. The second attack on the Kew Synagogue took place on 11 April on the second day of Passover. A window in the synagogue was broken and a petrol bomb was thrown in, damaging the interior of the building. The police reported that no message accompanied the March and April attacks.

The Caulfield Synagogue, founded in 1943, was also targeted in two attacks, both taking place in April 1990. The first incident took place on Friday, 20 April, at 3AM, and involved the use of a petrol bomb that damaged the exterior of the building. A second attempt to firebomb Caulfield Synagogue was made on the following night.

The Mizrachi Synagogue, founded in 1943, was also targeted on the same night as the second Caulfield Synagogue attack, but the attackers were frightened off by the synagogue caretaker.

Other acts of vandalism and property damage against synagogues in Melbourne continued in the months that followed.

== Response ==
Initial reports noted that Victoria Police were investigating the attacks. Jewish community members in Victoria increased security patrols of synagogues and Jewish community leaders noted the absence of condemnations by Church leaders. Jewish community leadership in Victoria called upon the state government to respond to the recent wave of anti-Jewish incidents, including the synagogue attacks.

The attacks also led to a response from Prime Minister Hawke who stated he would pursue new legislation to combat antisemitism.

In late 1990, synagogues in other states increased security measures fearing a rising tide of anti-Jewish incidents.

== See also ==
- 1991 Sydney synagogue attacks
- 2024 Melbourne synagogue attack
