= 1991 Sydney synagogue attacks =

Series of arson attacks on Australian synagogues in 1991

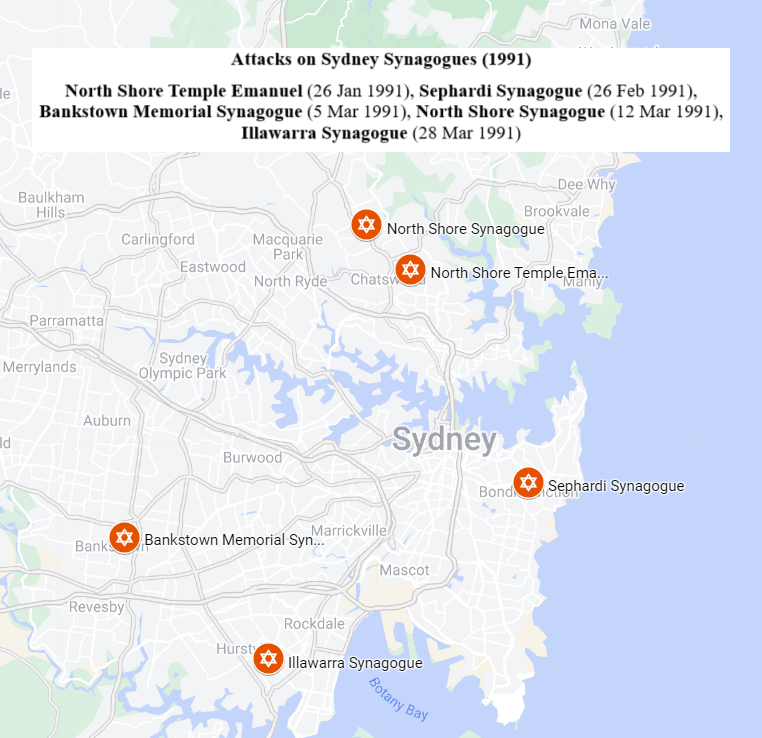
- Locations of the five attacks
- Location: Sydney, Australia
- Date: 26 January 1991 to 28 March 1991 (AEDT; UTC+11:00)
- Target: Members of Jewish congregations, five synagogue buildings
- Attack type: Arson attack
- Weapon: Petrol
- Deaths: 0
- Injuries: 1
- Perpetrator: At least two unknown perpetrators
- Four synagogues damaged Permanent closure of one synagogue Injury of one synagogue security guard

The 1991 Sydney synagogue attacks were a series of arson incidents, occurring between 26 January and 28 March 1991, targeting synagogues in Sydney, Australia. Five synagogues were attacked by arsonists within two months, resulting in one injury and over A$700,000 in damages. The attack also resulted in the permanent closure of the Bankstown Synagogue.

== Overview ==
The series of attacks began on 26 January 1991, at the North Shore Temple Emanuel, in Chatswood, with arsonists setting fire to and destroying the synagogue's kindergarten, causing A$385,000 in damages. The following attack occurred on 26 February, at the Sephardi Synagogue, in Woollahra, arsonists broke into the synagogue kitchen and set it ablaze, causing A$25,000 in damages. On 5 March, at the Bankstown Synagogue, arsonists broke into the sanctuary and set it ablaze, causing A$140,000 in damages. The Torah scrolls at the Bankstown Synagogue were pulled from the building before they could be damaged in the incident. The synagogue subsequently closed and its assets were transferred to other synagogues in Sydney. On 12 March, at the North Shore Synagogue, two masked arsonists attempted to set the synagogue ablaze when the attack was foiled by a security guard. The guard was injured in the altercation. On 28 March, at the Illawarra Synagogue, in Allawah, arsonists set the synagogue sanctuary ablaze, causing A$155,000 in damages. The Illawarra Synagogue was repaired shortly after the 28 March 1991 attack. The synagogue was later targeted by arsonists in 1993, although the damage was not as extensive as the 1991 attack. Hours before the attack on the Illawarra Synagogue, a delegation of Jewish community leaders had been meeting with Prime Minister Bob Hawke discussing legislative measures relating to racial vilification and racial violence. Police investigations resulted in no arrests. And the incidents prompted changes in the security measures adopted by Australian Jewish institutions.

Following these events, New South Wales Premier Nick Greiner ordered an increase of police security to Jewish sites, and established a police taskforce to work with Australian Security Intelligence Organisation (ASIO) and other intelligence groups to thwart attacks. On 20 June 1991, the Australian Senate agreed to a motion by Senator Robert Hill which noted the violence, intimidation and vandalism against the Jewish community in Australia, specifically, the arson attacks on five Sydney synagogues. The senate condemned the attacks and called on the Federal Government to respond to the issue.

That same year, synagogues in other Australian cities were targeted by vandals. Bricks were thrown through a window at the Newcastle synagogue, and a bloodied pig's head was placed at the Brisbane synagogue. The Adass Yeshurun Synagogue in Doncaster, Melbourne, was targeted with a flaming tyre placed at its entrance. And the National Jewish Centre in Canberra, was broken into and a large brass menorah was stolen from the premises.

== See also ==
- 1990 Melbourne synagogue attacks
- 2024 Melbourne synagogue attack – arson attack
- 2025 Bondi shooting - anti-Jewish terror attack, 16 killed
