= Allawah =

- Suburb
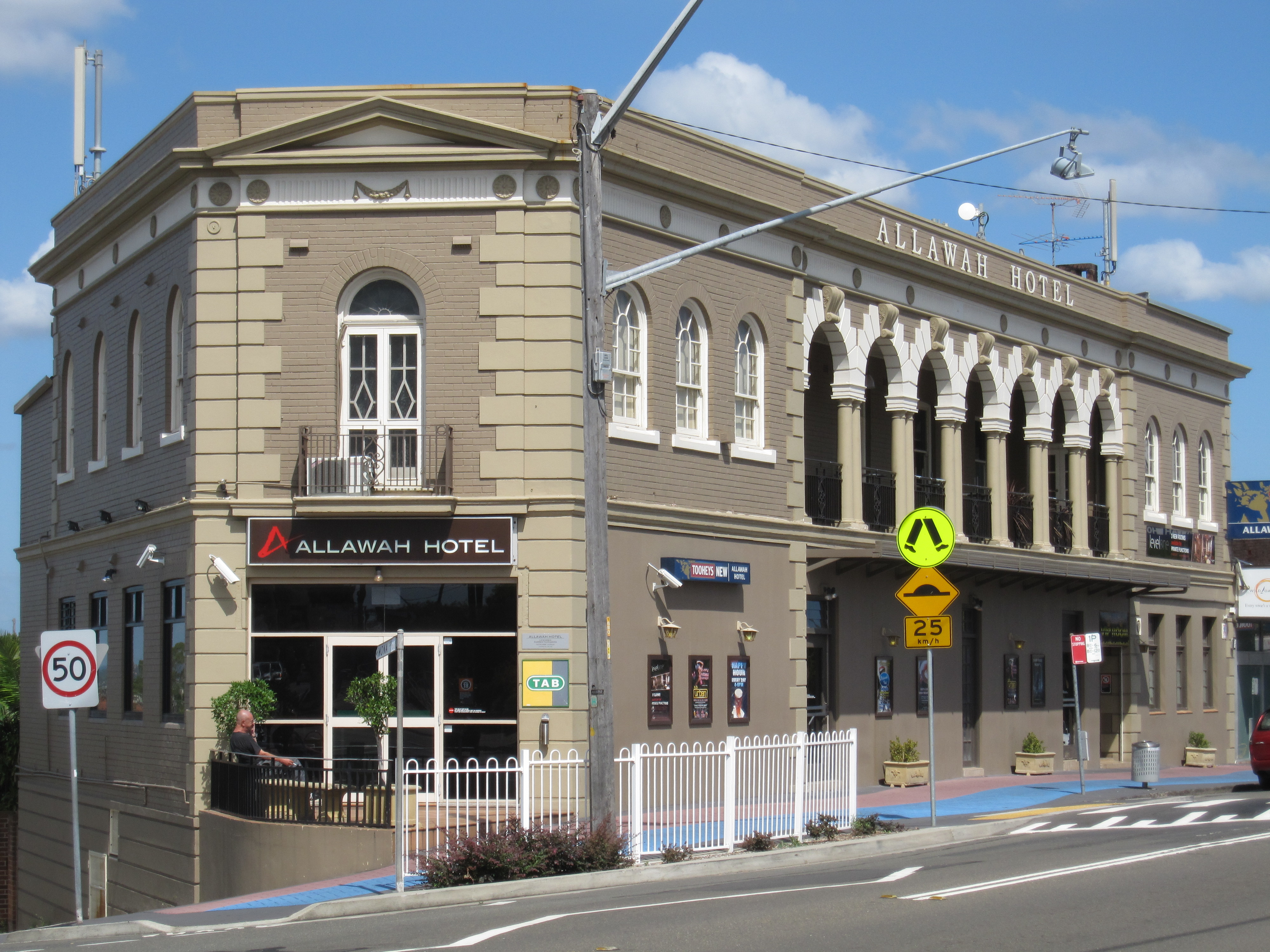
- Allawah Hotel, Railway Parade

- Interactive map of Allawah
- Coordinates: 33°58′30″S 151°07′00″E
- Country: Australia
- State: New South Wales
- City: Sydney
- LGA: Georges River Council
- Location: 15 km (9.3 mi) south of Sydney CBD

Government
  - State electorate: Kogarah
  - Federal division: Barton
- Elevation: 53 m (174 ft)

Population
  - Total: 5,351 (2021 census)
- Postcode: 2218
Suburbs around Allawah
| Hurstville | Bexley | Bexley |
| South Hurstville | Allawah | Carlton |
| Blakehurst | Carss Park | Carlton |

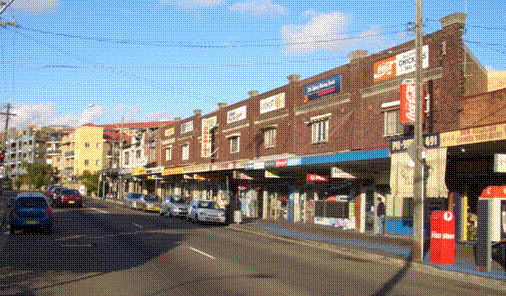
Railway Parade, Allawah

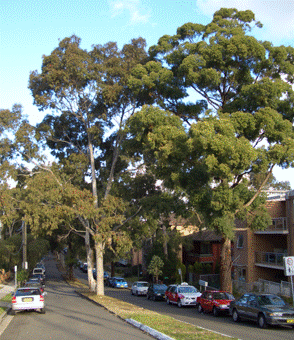
Lancelot Street, Allawah

Allawah is a suburb in southern Sydney, in the state of New South Wales, Australia. Allawah is 16 kilometres south of the Sydney central business district and is part of the St George area. Allawah lies in the local government area of the Georges River Council. The postcode is 2218, which is shared by the neighbouring suburb of Carlton.

== History ==
The name "Allawah" is Aboriginal in origin, from a local term meaning "make your abode here" or "remain here". It is thought that the Aboriginal clan of the Tharawal people most prominent in the St George area, the Gameygal or Kameygal – the people of Kamay (Botany Bay), lived in and around the area.

The first land grant was made in 1808 to Captain John Townson by Major George Johnston after he had briefly deposed Governor Bligh in 1808, consisting of 1,950 acres (790 hectares), which became known as Townson's Farm. The grant extended from King Georges Road and Stoney Creek Road (of modern-day Penshurst and Beverly Hills) to beyond Kogarah railway station. Later, an additional 250 acres (100 hectares) to the north was granted after Townson complained about the quality of about 300 acres (120 hectares) of this grant (in what was later to become Bexley, Carlton and Allawah).

The railway line to Hurstville was opened in 1884, but the railway station at Allawah did not open until 23 October 1925.

The Allawah post office opened in May 1933.

== Demographics ==
According to the 2021 census of Population, there were 5,351 residents in Allawah. 34.6% of people were born in Australia. The next most common countries of birth were China 16.0%, Nepal 12.2%, Philippines 3.7%, Hong Kong 2.6% and India 2.2%. 27.6% of people only spoke English at home. Other languages spoken at home included Mandarin 13.8%, Nepali 12.1%, Cantonese 10.8%, Arabic 3.3% and Macedonian 3.2%. The most common responses for religious affiliation were No Religion 30.1%, Catholic 16.0% and Hinduism 13.6%.

== Commercial area ==
Allawah is a small landlocked suburb, about 15–20 minutes walking distance from Hurstville. Allawah's main shopping centre is located on Railway Parade, beside Allawah railway station. The Allawah shopping strip contains a newsagent, post office, corner store, Nepalese/Indian grocery store, a real estate agency, take-away shops, a hairdresser, and the local pub and bottle shop, the Allawah Hotel. The Allawah Hotel was purchased by Justin Hemmes' Merivale Group in 2019.

== Transport ==
Allawah railway station is on the Illawarra line serviced by Sydney Trains. Trains to Bondi Junction and to Hurstville stop at Allawah six times an hour during peak times, and four times an hour at all other times except weekends. Weekends run two train services an hour in both directions. Allawah is a 25 minute commute to the CBD via train.

== Antisemitism ==
From the 1990s onward, the Jewish synagogue in Allawah has been the frequent target of antisemitic attacks, including firebombings, vandalism, and other arson attacks. Attacks have occurred in 1991, 1993, 1995, 2000, 2001, 2002, 2003, and 2025.

== Landmarks ==
- Allawah Hotel
- Meade Park
- PJ Ferry Reserve Community Hall
- Southern Sydney Synagogue
