= Hineni (Australian youth movement) =

Australian Modern Orthodox Zionist youth movement

Hineni Youth and Welfare
- Hineni Australia Semel (emblem)

Summary
- Motto: Hineni
- Meaning: "I am here"
- Founded: Sydney-1975; Melbourne-1996
- Ideology: Pluralist Zionist; Modern Orthodox; Activism
- Website: https://www.hineni.org.au/

Hineni Youth and Welfare or Hineni is a Modern Orthodox, politically active, Zionist youth movement. It was founded in Sydney, Australia, and operates in Sydney, Melbourne and Canberra.

== History ==
Hineni was established as a synagogue youth group in Sydney in 1974. In 1996 it opened a branch in Melbourne.

In Sydney, Hineni is the official youth movement of the Central Synagogue. In Melbourne, Hineni is affiliated with and supported by Caulfield Hebrew Congregation. In recent years the movement has started operating in Canberra, based at the Canberra Jewish Community Centre.

== Educational activities ==
Hineni runs weekly educational meetings for Jewish youth from years 2–12, as well as biannual camps, Israel year programs, seminars and other communal events. As an outreach movement, Hineni welcomes participants of all Jewish backgrounds, running its activities both inside community centers and in public parks.

The organization provides informal Jewish education to complement that received in school and the home. It provides a relaxed environment, where chanichim (program participants) forge a Jewish identity as well as an Australian one.

Hineni has welcomed neurodivergent children to some of its activities, especially in Melbourne.

As a Zionist organization with strong connections to Israel, Hineni has welcomed Israeli Shlichim from Israel, many employed through the Jewish Agency for Israel.

== Shnat ==
Shnat is a year-long gap program run by Hineni for high-school leavers. For the duration of the program the members reside in Israel and experience Israeli life and culture, while fulfilling the role of a Zionist Jew. The 2012 Shnat program has 25 participants, which is the largest group Hineni has sent to Israel. In contrast, in 2026 there were 10 participants.

The program encompasses volunteering, experiential and educational components. A year in Israel with Hineni is a chance to connect to the Jewish homeland; to learn about Jewish history, culture and religion; to form friendships with other young people from Israel and around the world; and to learn Hebrew.

The Hineni Shnat Program begins with AZYC Opening Seminar and Hineni Opening Seminar. Hineni Shnatties participate in Machon, a four-month program facilitated by the Education Department of the Jewish Agency for Israel. Machon is an educational institution where participants engage in leadership training, Jewish education and Zionist learning together with youth movement members from around the world. Hineni Shnat also includes a two-month Options Period where participants can choose from volunteering and educational options such as MDA ambulance service, the Marva army program, studying in Yeshiva/ Midrasha Jewish learning centres and more. Shnatties spend approximately six weeks living and working on a Kibbutz as well as participating in Hineni Jewish Learning Seminars and shabbatonim throughout the program.

== Hineni Youth and Welfare Leaders ==
2022 Hineni Leaders:

- Avital Prawer - Federal Rosh (President)
- Gabrielle Saffer - Melbourne Rosh (President)
- Keila van der Plaat - Melbourne Sgan (Vice-President)
- Noah Loven - Melbourne Rosh Chinuch (Head of Education)
- Leon Miller - Melbourne Gizbar (Treasurer)
- Amira Susskind - Without Portfolio
- Shaked Gozlan - Public Relations
- Ariella Hain - Limmudei Kodesh (Head of Jewish Studies)
- Benji van der Plaat - Junior Mentor

2023 Hineni Leaders:

- Rebecca Hertz - Federal Rosh (President)
- Joseph Folwell - Melbourne Rosh (President)
- Eva Boroda - Melbourne Sgan (Vice-President)
- Amira Susskind - Melbourne Rosh Chinuch (Head of Education)
- Yoni Gilboa - Melbourne Gizbar (Treasurer)
- Noah Loven - Without Portfolio
- Michael Goodman and Ellie Schwartz - Public Relations
- Gabrielle Green - Limmudei Kodesh (Head of Jewish Studies)

2024 Hineni Leaders:

- Zofi Rubenstein-Slezenger - Federal Rosh (President)
- Shira Saffer - Melbourne Rosh (President)
- Joel Raitman - Melbourne Sgan (Vice-President)
- Liav Allen - Melbourne Rosh Chinuch (Head of Education)
- Raphael Lazarus - Melbourne Gizbar (Treasurer)
- Benji van der Plaat - Without Portfolio
- Shelly Elovitch and Abbey Weinstein - Public Relations
- Joel Raitman - Limmudei Kodesh (Head of Jewish Studies)
- Shayna Epstein - Junior Mentor

2025 Hineni Leaders:

- Jasmine Harrison - Federal Rosh (President)
- Liav Allen - Melbourne Rosh (President)
- Gidon Miller - Melbourne Sgan (Vice-President)
- Eve Rosengarten - Melbourne Rosh Chinuch (Head of Education)
- Timna Shushan - Melbourne Gizbar (Treasurer)
- Shelly Elovitch - Melbourne Public Relations
- Michael Goodman and Abbey Weinstein - Melbourne Limmudei Kodesh (Head of Jewish Studies)
- Shayna Epstein - Melbourne Rosh Kiruv (Head of Canvassing)
- Theo Feiglin and Chanoch Serobryanski - Melbourne Junior Mentor
- Shelly Elovitch and Theo Feiglin - Melbourne Rosh Machane Choref (Co-directors of Winter Camp)
- Ethan Zines and TJ van der Plaat - Rosh Machane Federal Summer camp.
