= List of synagogues in Australia and New Zealand =

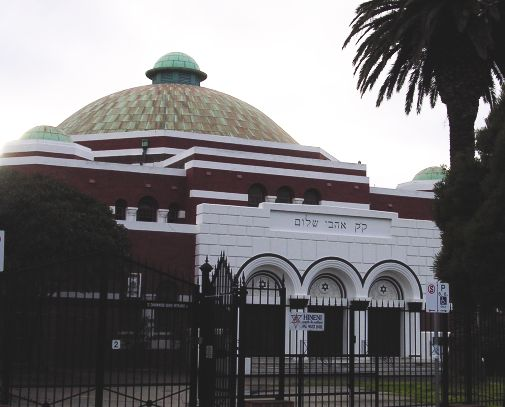
St. Kilda Hebrew Congregation in Melbourne designed by Joseph Plottel

This list of synagogues and Jewish congregations in Australia and New Zealand represents those known to have existed at some time in the history of Jewish communities in either the colonial or national periods of either countries.

Although many established congregations choose to build synagogues, Jewish congregations may also use existing, often residential, premises. In these cases only the interior is changed, leaving the exterior in its original design.

== Australia ==
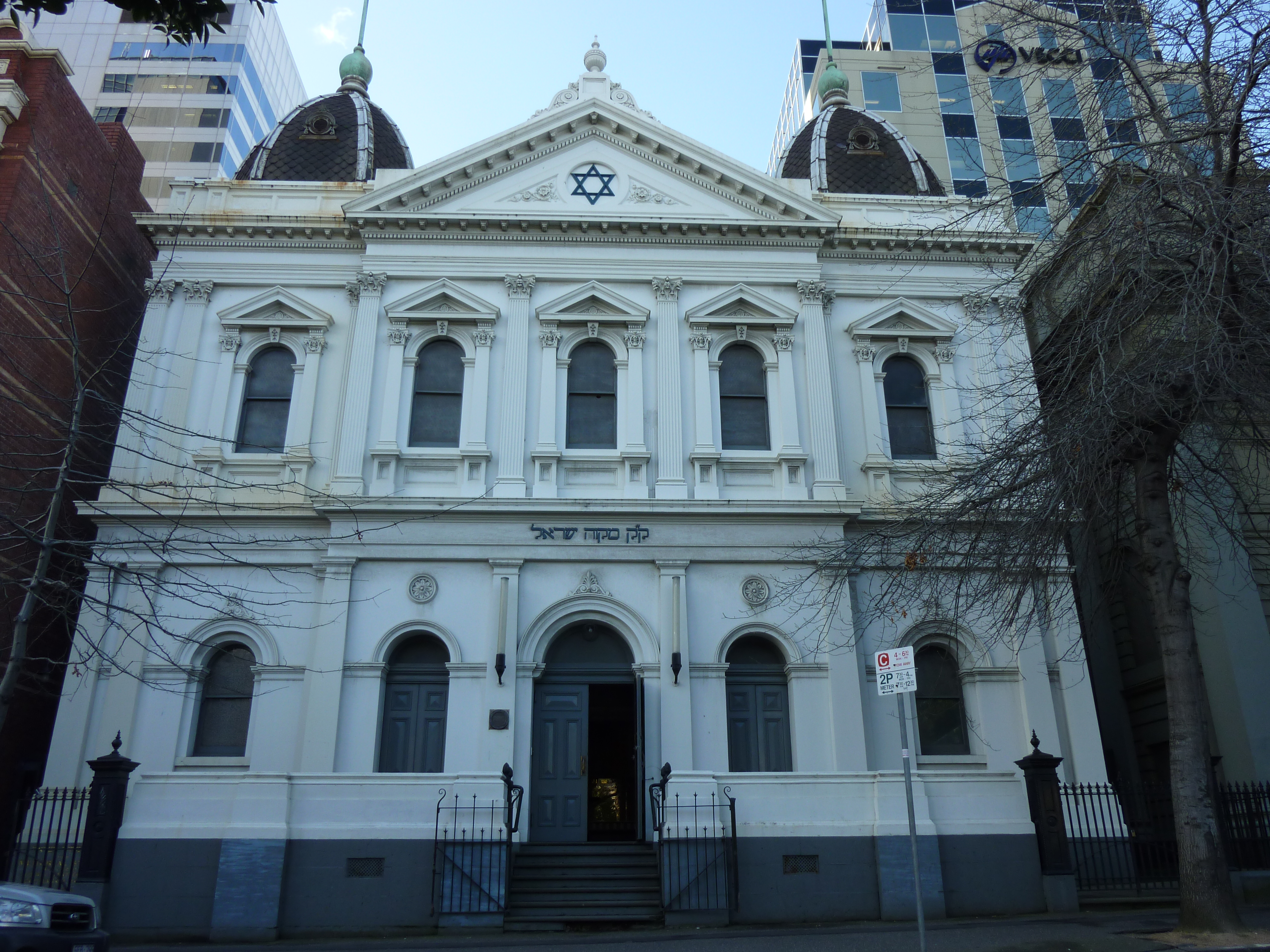
East Melbourne Synagogue

=== New South Wales and Australian Capital Territory ===
- Adath Yisroel Congregation, Bondi, NSW
- Bina, Bondi, NSW
- Bet Yosef (Caro), Bondi, NSW
- Central Coast Shalom Progressive, Tumbi Umbi, NSW
- Central Synagogue, Sydney, (Orach Chayyim) Bondi Junction, NSW
- Chabad Byron Bay, NSW
- Chabad Double Bay, Double Bay, NSW
- Chabad House of Bondi Beach/Friends of Refugees of Eastern Europe (FREE), Bondi Beach, NSW
- Chabad House of the North Shore, St Ives, NSW
- Chabad House for (Israeli) Tourists, Bondi, NSW
- Chabad shteible (49), Bondi Junction, NSW
- Coogee Synagogue, Coogee, NSW
- Cremorne and District Hebrew Congregation (Sha’arei Tzedek), Neutral Bay, NSW
- Dover Heights Shule, Dover Heights, NSW
- Emanuel Synagogue (Progressive, Masorti and Renewal), Woollahra, NSW
- The Great Synagogue (Bet Yisrael) Sydney, NSW
- Jewish Learning Centre, Bondi, NSW
- Kadimah, Central Coast, NSW
- Kehillat Kadimah, Rose Bay, NSW
- Kehillat Masada, St Ives, NSW
- Kehillat Moriah, Queens Park, NSW
- Maroubra Synagogue, Maroubra, NSW
- Mizrachi Synagogue Bondi, North Bondi, NSW
- National Jewish Memorial Centre – Canberra and Region Jewish Community, Manuka, ACT (Progressive and Orthodox services)
- Nefesh/Roscoe Street Synagogue, Bondi Beach, NSW
- Newcastle Hebrew Congregation (Bet Yisra’el), Newcastle, NSW
- Newtown Synagogue (Mikveh Yisra’el), Newtown, NSW
- North Shore Synagogue (The Garden Synagogue), (Tzedek Ve'Emet) Lindfield, New South Wales
- North Shore Temple Emanuel, Chatswood, NSW
- Or Chadash, Bondi, NSW
- Parramatta Synagogue, Parramatta, NSW
- Rainbow Kehilah, Byron Bay, NSW
- Sephardi Synagogue, Woollahra, NSW
- Southern Sydney Synagogue - formerly Illawarra Hebrew Congregation, Allawah, NSW
- Tzemach Tzedek Community Centre, Bondi, NSW
- Yeshiva Centre Synagogue, Bondi NSW
- Young Adult Chabad, Bondi, NSW

==== Inactive ====
- Baba Sali, Dover Heights, NSW from 1994 to 2003
- Bankstown War Memorial Synagogue. Destroyed in an arson attack in 1991.
- Broken Hill Synagogue, NSW 1910 to 1962
- Forbes Synagogue, a small timber building during the 1860s gold rush, possibly burnt or washed away in a flood.
- Goulburn synagogue, Goulburn, NSW, 1824 to late 19th century. Property was granted but Synagogue was not built.
- Harambam Synagogue (Sephardi), Bondi, NSW (no longer functional)
- Kensington Shul, Redfern and then in Kensington, NSW, 2000? to 2012
- Maitland Synagogue, Maitland, NSW 1830 onwards. Substantial synagogue erected 1879, closed in 1898
- Macquarie Street Synagogue (Sukkat David), Sydney, NSW, to 1877
- Ryde and Districts Synagogue, (Beth Eliyahu) North Ryde, NSW
- Shtiebell, Bellevue Hill, NSW (part of Bina) (until 2010)
- South Head Synagogue, Rose Bay, NSW
- Strathfield and District Hebrew Congregation, Strathfield, NSW (http://strathfieldschule.weebly.com/)
- York Street Synagogue, Sydney, NSW, 1844 to 1877

=== Queensland ===
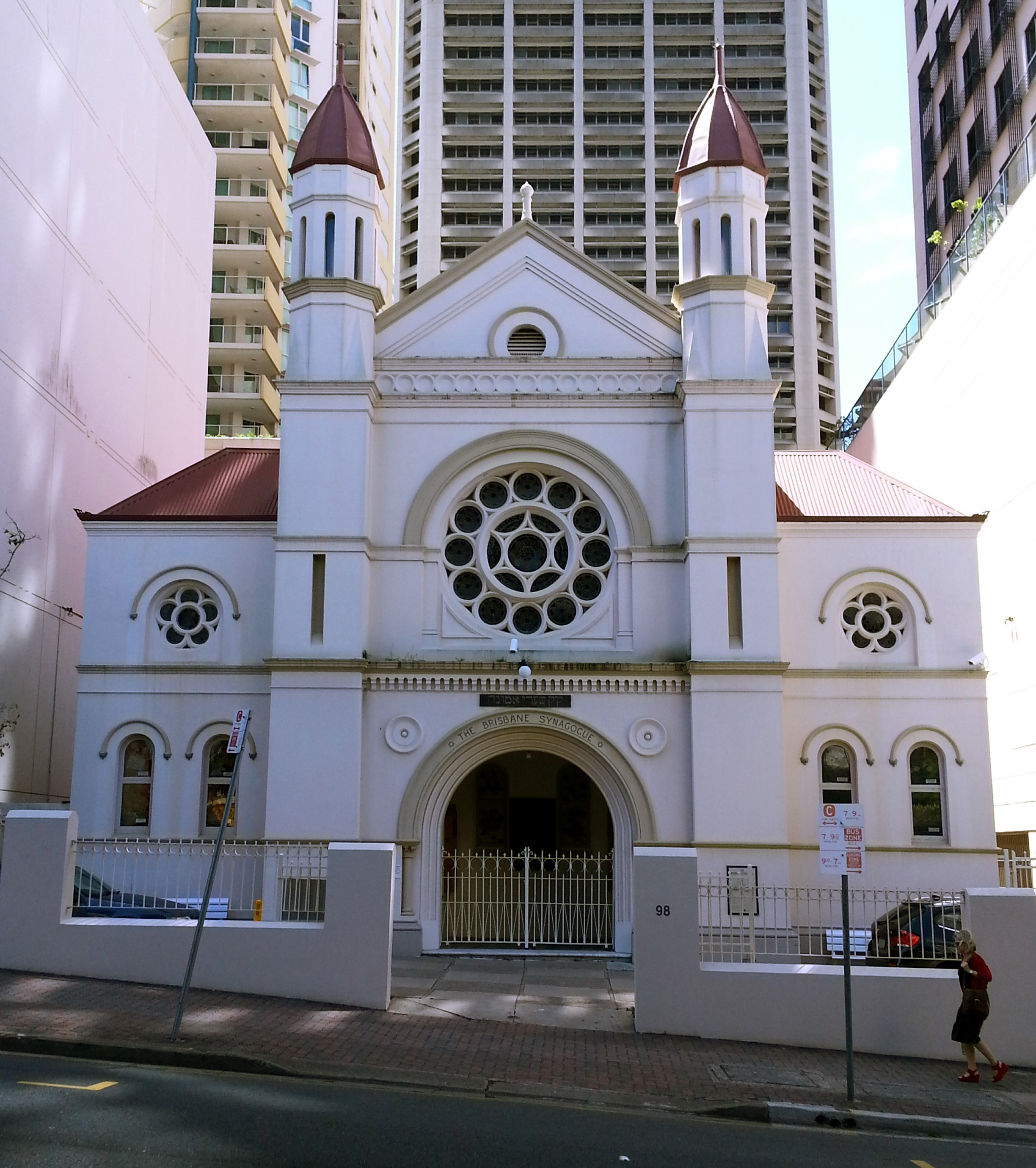
Brisbane Synagogue

- Beit Or v'Shalom Inc - Progressive Jewish Synagogue - Carina, Brisbane, Qld
- Chabad House of Brisbane, Carindale, Brisbane, Qld
- Givat Tziyyon - South Brisbane Hebrew Orthodox Congregation, Greenslopes, Brisbane, Qld
- Sha’arei Emunah - Brisbane Hebrew Congregation, Brisbane, Qld
- Bet Shlomo - The Gold Coast Hebrew Congregation, Surfers Paradise, Gold Coast, Qld
- Temple Shalom, Isle Of Capri, Gold Coast, Qld
- Chabad of North Queensland RARA - Cairns & Townsville, Qld

=== South Australia ===
- Chabad of South Australia (1998–present), currently located in Evandale, SA
- Adelaide Hebrew Congregation Inc.(1990–present), 'The Adelaide Synagogue', Glenside, SA

previously Adelaide Hebrew Congregation (1850–1990), Adelaide, SA

- Adelaide Progressive Jewish Congregation Inc., 'Beit Shalom Synagogue' (1976–present), Hackney, SA

initially named 'Temple Shalom' and previously at Prospect, SA (1967–1976)

=== Tasmania ===
- Hobart Synagogue - Hobart Hebrew Congregation
- Launceston Synagogue

=== Victoria ===
==== Conservative ====
- Kehilat Nitzan Synagogue, (Masorti) Caulfield Junction, Vic

==== Orthodox ====
- Adass Israel Congregation, Ripponlea, Vic
- Aish Melbourne Australia, Ripponlea, Vic
- Ark Centre, East Hawthorn, Vic
- Ballarat Hebrew Congregation (She’erit Yisra’el), Ballarat, Vic
- Beis Menachem Community Centre, East Bentleigh, Vic
- Beit Aharon (Arnold Bloch) Memorial Synagogue, East St Kilda, Vic
- Beth Chabad Ohel Devorah, East St Kilda, Vic
- Beth Chabad Yotz’ei Russia (F.R.E.E.), East St Kilda, Vic
- Blake Street Hebrew Congregation, South Caulfield, Vic
- B'nai B'rith House, East St Kilda, Vic
- Brighton Hebrew Congregation, East Brighton, Vic
- Caulfield Beth Hamedrash (Katanga), North Caulfield, Vic
- Caulfield Hebrew Congregation Inc. Synagogue (Kehilla Kedosha Ahavath Shalom), North Caulfield, Vic
- Central Shule Chabad, South Caulfield, Vic
- Chabad Bayside, Congregation Beis Eliyahu, East Brighton, Vic
- Chabad House Carnegie, Carnegie, Vic
- Chabad House of Caulfield, 770, East St Kilda, Vic
- Chabad House East Bentleigh, East Bentleigh, Vic
- Chabad House Glen Eira, Caulfield, Vic
- Chabad House Malvern, Malvern, Vic
- Chabad Frankston, Vic
- Chabad Dingley Village
- Chabad for Israeli travellers, Caulfield Vic
- Chabad of Melbourne CBD, Melbourne, Vic
- DaMinyan, East St Kilda, Vic
- East Melbourne Hebrew Congregation (Mikveh Yisra’el), East Melbourne, Vic
- Hamerkaz Shelanu Elsternwick, Vic
- Elsternwick Jewish Community (Etz Chayyim), Elsternwick, Vic
- Elwood Talmud Torah Hebrew Congregation (Bet Avraham), Elwood, Vic
- Friends of Lubavitch, Caulfield North, Vic
- Gerrer Shtiebel, East St Kilda, Vic
- Hamayan, North Caulfield, Vic
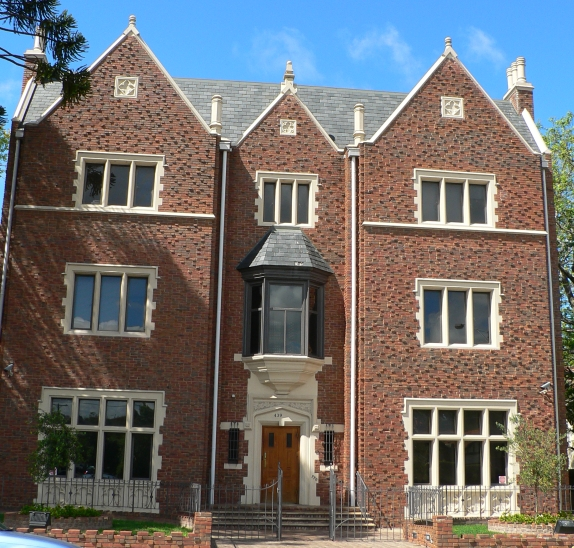
  chabad house of Caulfield 770
- Hamerkaz Shelanu, Elsternwick, Vic
- Heichal HaTorah, Ripponlea, Vic
- Jewish Care, Melbourne, Vic
- Jewish Centre Ormond McKinnon, Ormond, Vic
- Kew Hebrew Congregation (Bet Nachman), Kew, Vic
- Kolel Menachem Lubavitch (Chabad), East St Kilda, Vic
- Kollel Beth HaTalmud Yehuda Fishman Institute, Balaclava, Vic
- Melbourne Hebrew Congregation (She’erit Yisra’el), South Yarra, Vic
- Merkaz HaTorah, North Caulfield, Vic
- Merkos L'inyonei Chinuch (Chabad), East St Kilda, Vic
- Mizrachi Synagogue, North Caulfield, Vic comprising:
  - Beit Haroeh
  - Beit Yehuda
  - Bnei Akiva Melbourne
  - Haskama minyan
  - Ohr David-Beit Midrash Naftali Herc
- Moorabbin Hebrew Congregation, Moorabbin, Vic
- North Eastern Jewish War Memorial Centre - Yeshurun Congregation, Doncaster, Vic
- Rabbinical College of Australia and New Zealand (Yeshiva Gedolah), St Kilda East, Victoria
- Ramban Sephardi Congregation, East St Kilda, Vic
- Sassoon Yehuda Sephardi Synagogue, Balaclava, Vic
- Kehilas Veyatzev Avrohom, Ripponlea, Vic
- Sha'arei Tefillah, North Caulfield, Vic
- Shira Hadasha, Caulfield North, Vic
- Shnei Ohr Chabad, Caulfield North, Vic
- South Caulfield Hebrew Congregation, South Caulfield, Vic
- Spiritshul, Caulfield North, Vic
- St Kilda Hebrew Congregation (Ohavei Shalom), St. Kilda, Vic
- Mifgash Carnegie, Vic
- Ohel Devorah, St Kilda East, Vic
- Yeshivah Shul (Chabad)
- Young Yeshivah (Chabad)

==== Progressive ====
- Bentleigh Progressive Synagogue, Victoria, Vic
- Kehilat David Hamelech (KEDEM), (Progressive) Armadale, Vic
- Leo Baeck Centre for Progressive Judaism, (Progressive) East Kew, Vic
- Temple Beth Israel, (Progressive) St. Kilda, Vic

==== Inactive ====
- Sandhurst (now Bendigo) Vic 1872 to approximately 1927
- Brunswick Talmud Torah, Brunswick, Vic 1943 to 1987
- Burwood Hebrew Congregation, Burwood, Vic (until 2010)
- Geelong Synagogue, Geelong, Vic 1861 to ?
- Hamakom, North Caulfield, Vic
- Highlands Hebrew Congregation, Seymour, Vic
- Monash Area Jewish Community, Monash, Vic

=== Western Australia ===
- Beit Midrash of Western Australia - The Dianella Shul, Yokine, Perth, WA
- Chabad of Western Australia, Noranda, Perth, WA
- Perth Hebrew Congregation, Menora, Perth, WA
- Temple David Congregation, Inc., Mt Lawley, Perth, WA
- Kol Sasson Congregation., Menora, Perth, WA
- Perth Kabbalat Shabbat - A musical and egalitarian congregation, Yokine, Perth, WA

==== Inactive ====
- Goldfields Hebrew Congregation (1896 to 1899), Coolgardie, WA
- Kalgoorlie Hebrew Congregation (1901 to 1940), Kalgoorlie, WA
- Chabad Torah Foundation, Perth, WA
- Fremantle Synagogue (1902 to 1910), South Terrace, Fremantle WA
- Northern Suburbs Hebrew Congregation, Noranda, Perth, WA

== New Zealand ==
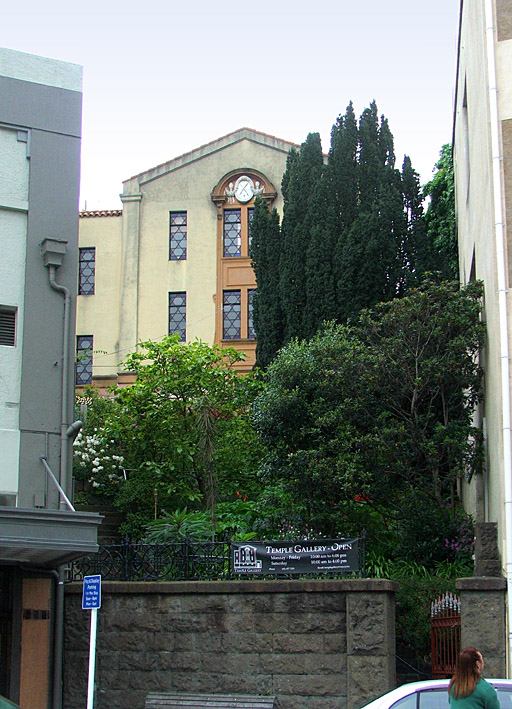
Dunedin's former synagogue, in Moray Place, is now an art gallery.

=== North Island ===
==== Auckland ====
- Auckland Hebrew Congregation (Beth Israel), (Orthodox)
  - Synagogue and Community Centre, 108 Greys Avenue
  - Former synagogue (1885 to 1967) - building now occupied by the University of Auckland and called University House
- Chabad Auckland New Zealand (Chabad Synagogue)
- Beth Shalom, (Progressive) Auckland

==== Hamilton ====
- Waikato Jewish Association

==== Wellington ====
- Wellington Jewish Community Centre (incorporating the Beth El Synagogue of the former Wellington Hebrew Congregation), (Orthodox) Wellington
- Temple Sinai - Wellington Progressive Jewish Congregation, Wellington

=== South Island ===
- Canterbury Hebrew Congregation, 406 Durham Street North, Christchurch Central, Christchurch 8013 (Orthodox and Progressive Shabbat services every Friday at 6.30pm and 1030am on Saturday) Christchurch
- Chabad of Otago, (Orthodox) Queenstown
- Dunedin Jewish Congregation, (Progressive) Dunedin
- Dunedin Synagogue, Dunedin (1880 to 1966) - the southernmost synagogue in the world and a listed historic building.
