= Southern Sydney Synagogue =

Synagogue in Sydney, Australia

Coordinates: 33°58′09″S 151°06′41″E

- Predecessor: Illawarra Hebrew Association
- Formation: 1943; 83 years ago
- Founder: Nathan Haneman
- Merger of: Illawarra Hebrew Congregation, South Coast Hebrew Congregation, Bankstown Synagogue
- Type: Modern Orthodox congregation
- Location: Allawah, New South Wales, Australia
- Region served: Southern Sydney, Illawarra
- Formerly called: Illawarra Hebrew Congregation, Illawarra Synagogue, Illawarra, South Coast and District Synagogue

The Southern Sydney Synagogue is located in the suburb of Allawah in Sydney, Australia. The congregation is incorporated as an amalgamation of the Illawarra Hebrew Congregation, the South Coast Hebrew Congregation, and the Bankstown Synagogue. The Southern Sydney Synagogue has been the target of firebombing, vandalism, and arson incidents on multiple occasions between the 1990s and the 2020s.

== Overview ==
The Illawarra congregation was originally established in 1943 as the Illawarra Hebrew Congregation, also known as the Illawarra Synagogue. The synagogue's founder was Nathan Haneman, a Lithuanian Jew who migrated to Australia in 1928. Prior to the establishment of the congregation, Haneman sought to organise the local Jewish community and first founded the Illawarra Hebrew Association in the early 1930s. The association was active in promoting Jewish education in the local area. The congregation included Holocaust survivors who supplied ritual objects salvaged from synagogues destroyed by the Nazis. In 1954, the congregation purchased a centre at 5 Andover Street, in Carlton. By 1959, the congregation had grown and began seeking to build or purchase a larger centre. In 1960, the congregation joined eleven other Sydney synagogues to form the Federation of Orthodox Synagogues in New South Wales. Additionally, in 1960, the congregation purchased the former RSL building in Allawah. In 1966, the congregation formally registered as a non-profit corporation and changed its name to the Illawarra Synagogue. In 1977, the congregation expanded with the purchase of the former Mormon Church of Allawah. In 1998, the congregation changed its name to the Southern Sydney Synagogue.

=== Mergers ===
In 1982, after the closure of the South Coast Hebrew Congregation's synagogue in Wollongong, originally founded in 1963, the congregation merged with the Illawarra Synagogue, and was known as the Illawarra, South Coast and District Synagogue.

Following the destruction of the Bankstown Synagogue in 1991, its congregation merged with Southern Sydney Synagogue.

== Antisemitic attacks ==
The Southern Sydney Synagogue has been the target of firebombing, vandalism, and arson incidents on at least nine separate occasions:

- 1991 firebombing – On 28 March 1991, the synagogue was targeted by arsonists in a firebombing attack. The attack was viewed as part of a series of attacks on synagogues in Sydney occurring in early 1991. The arson attack forced the synagogue to close for three months for repairs costing over A$200,000, with services held in a temporary venue.
- 1993 firebombing – On 1 August 1993, the synagogue was targeted in a firebombing, with petrol-bombs damaging the exterior wall of the synagogue. A day earlier, the congregation celebrated its fiftieth anniversary at a ball at the Airport Hilton. The attack was condemned by the NSW Jewish Board of Deputies.
- 1995 vandalism incidents – In early 1995, the synagogue was targeted in two separate vandalism incidents.
  - The first incident saw swastikas spray-painted on the synagogue windows.
  - The second incident saw bricks thrown into the synagogue, shattering two windows.
- 2000 vandalism incident – In September 2000, the Southern Sydney Synagogue as well as a synagogue in Bondi were vandalised.
- 2001 firebombing attempt – In May 2001, an attempt was made to firebomb the synagogue. The congregation subsequently spent A$10,000 for security upgrades on the synagogue building.
- 2002 vandalism incident – On 2 April 2002, the Southern Sydney Synagogue was vandalised with the words "Free Palestine" daubed on the walls. The attack was condemned by the Australian Catholic Social Justice Council.
- 2003 arson attack – In 2003, the Southern Sydney Synagogue was targeted in an arson attack. Reportedly, vandals smeared oil on one of the synagogue walls and then used an accelerant to set it and the synagogue lawn alight. The synagogue suffered damage from the smoke and flames. The synagogue president alleged that the state government had agreed to the implementation of security measures but failed to deliver them prior to the attack.
- 2025 vandalism incident – On 10 January 2025, the synagogue was targeted in a vandalism incident that saw swastikas and pro-Palestinian slogans spray-painted on the synagogue walls. The synagogue was also defaced with the partly obscured words "Allah Hu Akbar". The NSW premier, Chris Minns, condemned the attack. A day after the attack, the Newtown Synagogue was vandalised with the arsonists attempting to burn down the synagogue. The two incidents were condemned by the Australian Human Rights Commission.

== See also ==
- List of synagogues in Sydney
  - Great Synagogue (Sydney)
  - Central Synagogue (Sydney)
  - Emanuel Synagogue (Sydney)
  - North Shore Synagogue
