= East Melbourne Hebrew Congregation =

Heritage-listed synagogue in East Melbourne, Victoria, Australia

- Hebrew: ק"ק מקוה ישראל
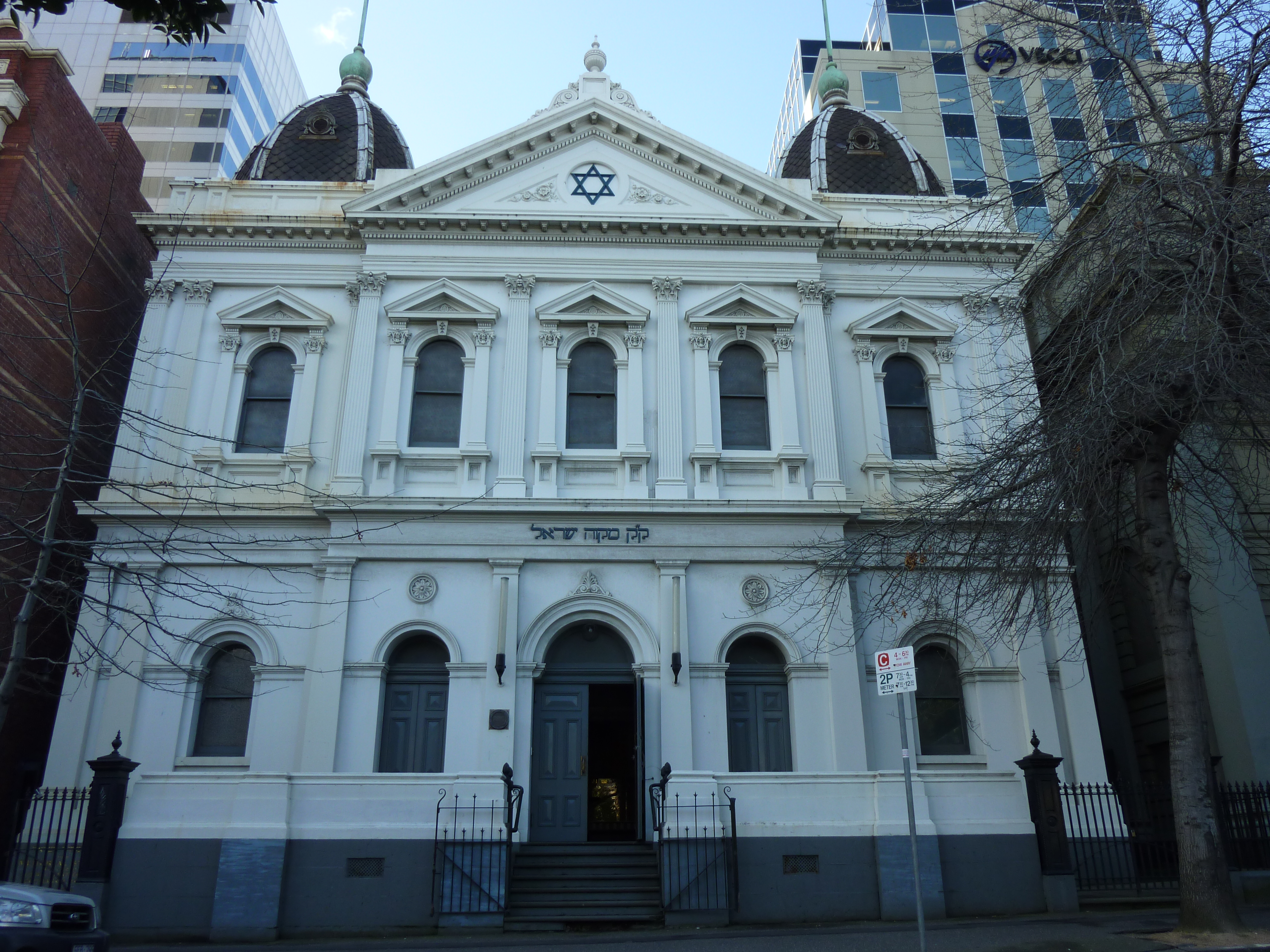
- The synagogue façade

- Location of the synagogue in Melbourne

Religion
- Affiliation: Orthodox Judaism
- Ecclesiastical or organisational status: Synagogue
- Leadership: Rabbi Dovid Gutnick
- Year consecrated: 1877
- Status: Active

Location
- Location: 494-500 Albert Street, East Melbourne, Victoria
- Country: Australia
- Coordinates: 37°48′33″S 144°58′27″E

Architecture
- Architect: Crouch & Wilson
- Type: Synagogue architecture
- Style: Renaissance Revival
- Groundbreaking: 20 March 1877
- Completed: 1877; 149 years ago
- Construction cost: A£7,000

Specifications
- Direction of façade: South
- Capacity: 470 worshippers
- Length: 22.2 metres (73 ft)
- Width: 12.8 metres (42 ft)
- Height (max): 9.4 metres (31 ft)
- Dome: 2
- Materials: Brick
- Victorian Heritage Register
- Official name: East Melbourne Synagogue
- Type: State heritage (built)
- Designated: 4 November 1991
- Reference no.: 353
- Type: Synagogue
- Category: Religion

Website
- melbournecitysynagogue.com

The East Melbourne Hebrew Congregation (Hebrew: ק"ק מקוה ישראל, romanized: Mickva Yisrael), also known as East Melbourne Shule, East Melbourne Synagogue, Melbourne City Synagogue or City of Melbourne Synagogue is an Orthodox Jewish congregation and historically significant synagogue, located in East Melbourne, Victoria, Australia. The synagogue, consecrated in 1877, is the oldest in Melbourne.

== History ==
The congregation was formed in 1857 under the leadership of Reverend Moses Rintel following his leave from the Melbourne Hebrew Congregation. Initially named Mikveh Israel Melbourne Synagogue, it was provided with a government land grant in 1859 on the corner of Little Lonsdale Street and Stephen Street (today Exhibition Street) in Melbourne's City Centre. A small synagogue was erected on the site in 1860. The congregation consisted primarily of Rintel's followers, including German and Eastern-European Jews who lived in Melbourne's inner-city suburbs within walking distance of the synagogue.

Seeking new premises, the congregation received government permission to sell its property in 1870. It moved to a new site on Albert Street, East Melbourne, where a new synagogue building was consecrated in 1877. Rintel served the congregation until his death in 1880.

Notable members of the congregation included Sir Isaac Isaacs and Sir John Monash. Monash celebrated his Bar Mitzvah at the synagogue and also sang in its choir.

In March 1977 the synagogue's centenary was celebrated with a special service led by Rabbi M. Honig.

On 4 July 2025, a 34-year-old Toongabbie man set fire to the entrance of the building with 20 people inside after failing to gain access to the inside of the synagogue. The man had earlier rung the synagogue's doorbell before moving against the wall of the synagogue with a petrol bomb, waiting for the doors to open. After the doors did not open, the man rang the bell a second time, before pouring a flammable liquid on the front door of the building and setting it on alit before fleeing the scene on foot.

== Architecture ==
Continuously in use since 1877, the East Melbourne Synagogue is the oldest in Melbourne and the largest 19th-century synagogue in Victoria. It is listed on the Victorian Heritage Register and is classified by the National Trust of Australia due to its historical, social, and architectural significance.

The two-storeyed synagogue was designed by noted Melbourne architects Crouch & Wilson. The internal space is surrounded on three sides by a gallery carried by cast iron columns, each surmounted by an unusual arrangement of an impost block flanked by consoles. The main ceiling is paneled, with a row of large and unusual ventilators marking the location of former suspended gas lights. The original interior, particularly the bimah and Torah ark, remain in an intact state.

The building's facade, constructed in the style of Renaissance Revival, was completed in 1883. It comprises five bays. Tuscan pilasters divide the bays of the lower floor, and Corinthian pilasters divide the upper floor bays. Two dome-like mansard roofs flank the central pediment.

== Today ==
Led by Rabbi Dovid Gutnick since November 2007, the congregation has a current membership of around 200 families. It is currently the only synagogue in Melbourne's inner-city area.

In January 2012, the congregation celebrated its 155th anniversary with a double Torah dedication ceremony and fundraising gala dinner attended by Rabbi Lord Jonathan Sacks (later Baron Sacks), Chief Rabbi of the United Kingdom and the Commonwealth.

== See also ==
- History of the Jews in Australia
- List of synagogues in Australia
- Oldest synagogues in the world
