= Central Synagogue (Sydney) =

Modern Orthodox synagogue in New South Wales

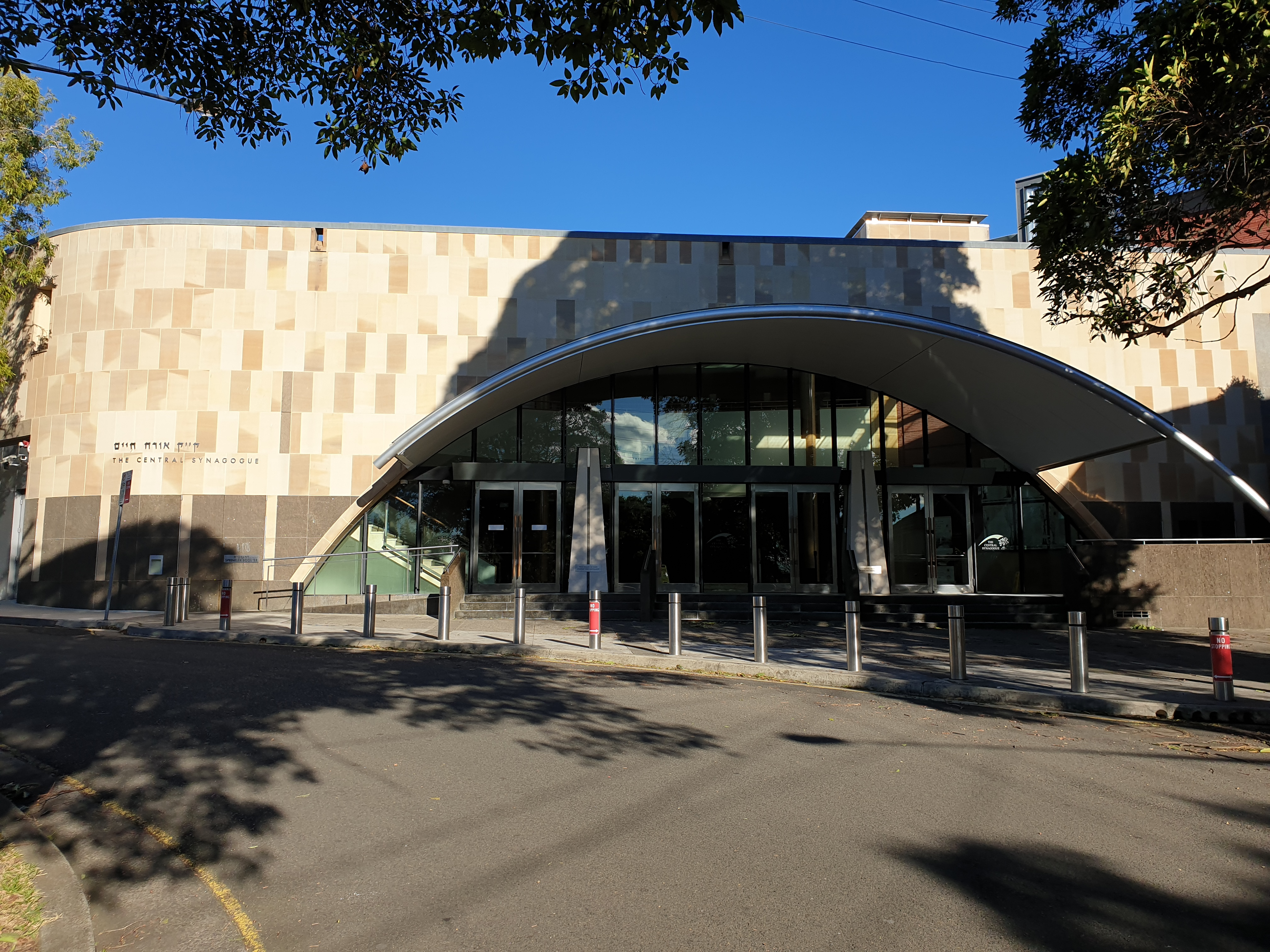
- Entrance to the synagogue in 2019

- Location in greater metropolitan Sydney

Religion
- Affiliation: Modern Orthodox Judaism
- Ecclesiastical or organizational status: Synagogue
- Leadership: Rabbi Levi Wolff
- Status: Active

Location
- Location: Bondi Junction Sydney, New South Wales
- Country: Australia
- Interactive map of Central Synagogue
- Coordinates: 33°53′24″S 151°15′25″E

Architecture
- Type: Synagogue architecture
- Completed: In Surry Hills: 1912; 114 years ago; In current location: 1960; 66 years ago; Current building: 1998; 28 years ago
- Capacity: 2,000

Website
- centralsynagogue.com.au

The Central Synagogue is a Modern Orthodox Jewish synagogue located in the Sydney suburb of Bondi Junction, New South Wales, Australia. The synagogue is the largest synagogue in the Southern Hemisphere and has the largest Jewish congregation in Australasia. It is located in Bon Accord Avenue and extends back to Kenilworth Street. It was constructed at its present location in 1960 after originally being located in Paddington and then Bondi. It was burned down in 1994 by a devastating fire caused by an electrical fault. The synagogue was rebuilt and reopened in 1998. Hineni is the official youth movement of Central Synagogue.

== Building ==
The core synagogue is a two-level atrium. An oculus in the ceiling floods the room with natural lighting. Centrally located on the first floor directly beneath the oculus, the bimah and aron kodesh are positioned in a direct line with Jerusalem. Imported Jerusalem stone adorns the aron kodesh and features prominently throughout the synagogue. Four large windows designed by Australian artist Janet Laurence feature forty-nine veils of glass. Each window represents one of Four Worlds of Kabbalah and the number forty-nine is symbolic of the highest level of spirituality in Judaism. The colours of the windows symbolise the sephirot.

The greater synagogue complex includes multiple halls and rooms, including:

- The Julius & Erna Platus Hall, the grand entrance to the synagogue complex with glass doors and a glass roof.
- The Lowy Beit Midrash, featuring its own aron kodesh
- The Triguboff Family Foyer
- The John Saunders Hall, the largest reception hall with a high ceiling, its own foyer and a dance-floor

== History ==
Logo of the congregation

The Central Synagogue was formed as the Surry Hills congregation in 1912 with the aim of introducing Eastern European custom into Sydney, and to arrest the drift from Judaism. The Bondi-Waverley congregation, established in 1918, and merged with that of Surry Hills in March 1921, to form the Eastern Suburbs Central Synagogue at Bondi Junction. The Central Synagogue was firstly an endeavour to provide more accommodation for worship in the Eastern Suburbs, but also, at least initially, intended to provide a less anglicised environment than that found at the Great Synagogue. The foundation stone was laid by the Chief Rabbi of the British Empire, Dr J. H. Hertz.

Central Synagogue was targeted by thieves in 1959, and 2001.

In 1960, the synagogue was targeted with antisemitic graffiti.

== See also ==
- Judaism in Australia
- List of synagogues in Sydney
  - Great Synagogue (Sydney)
  - Emanuel Synagogue (Sydney)
  - North Shore Synagogue
  - Southern Sydney Synagogue
