= Old Synagogue, Canterbury =

Former synagogue in Canterbury, England

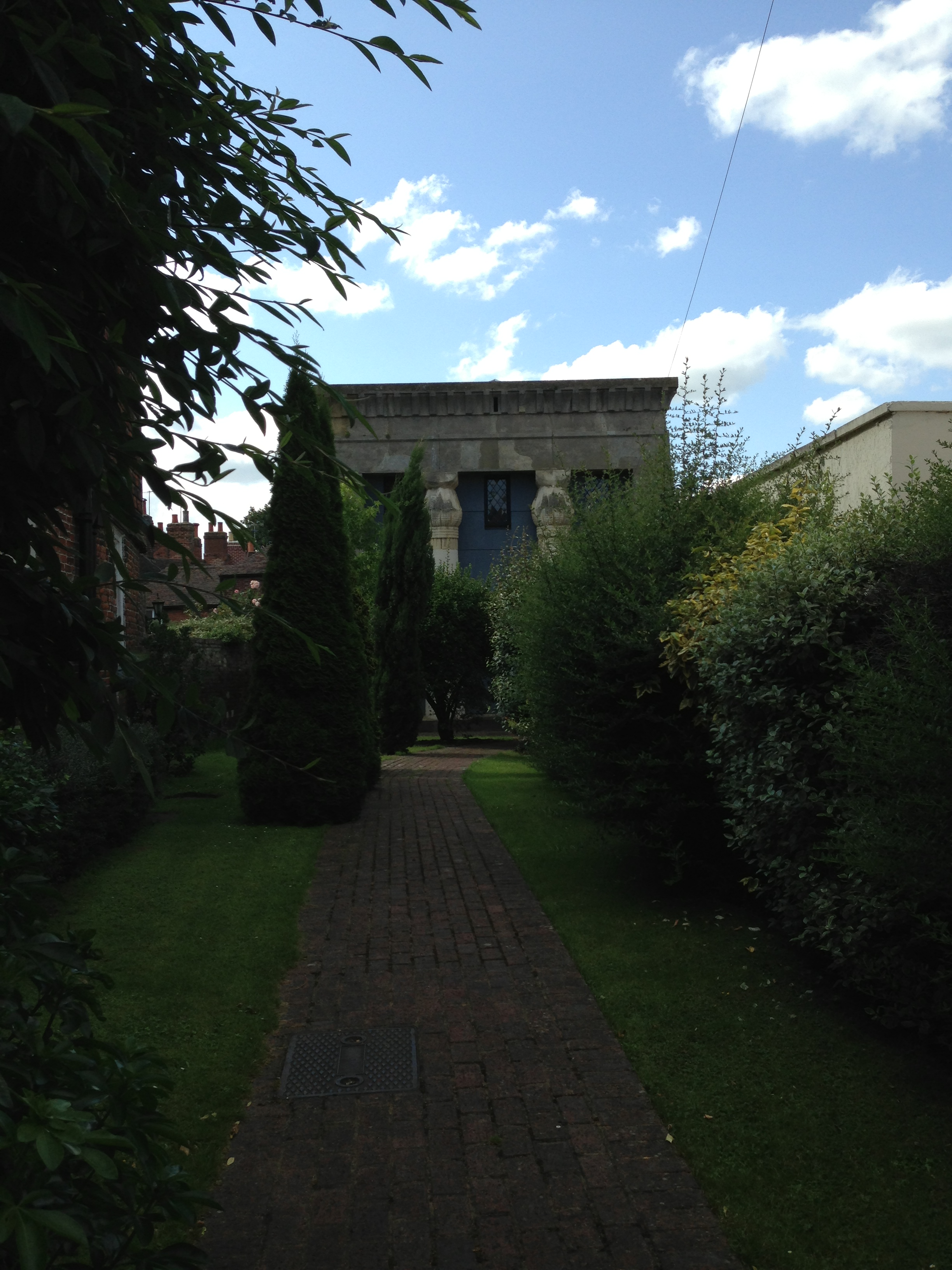
- The former synagogue in 2014, now part of The King's School

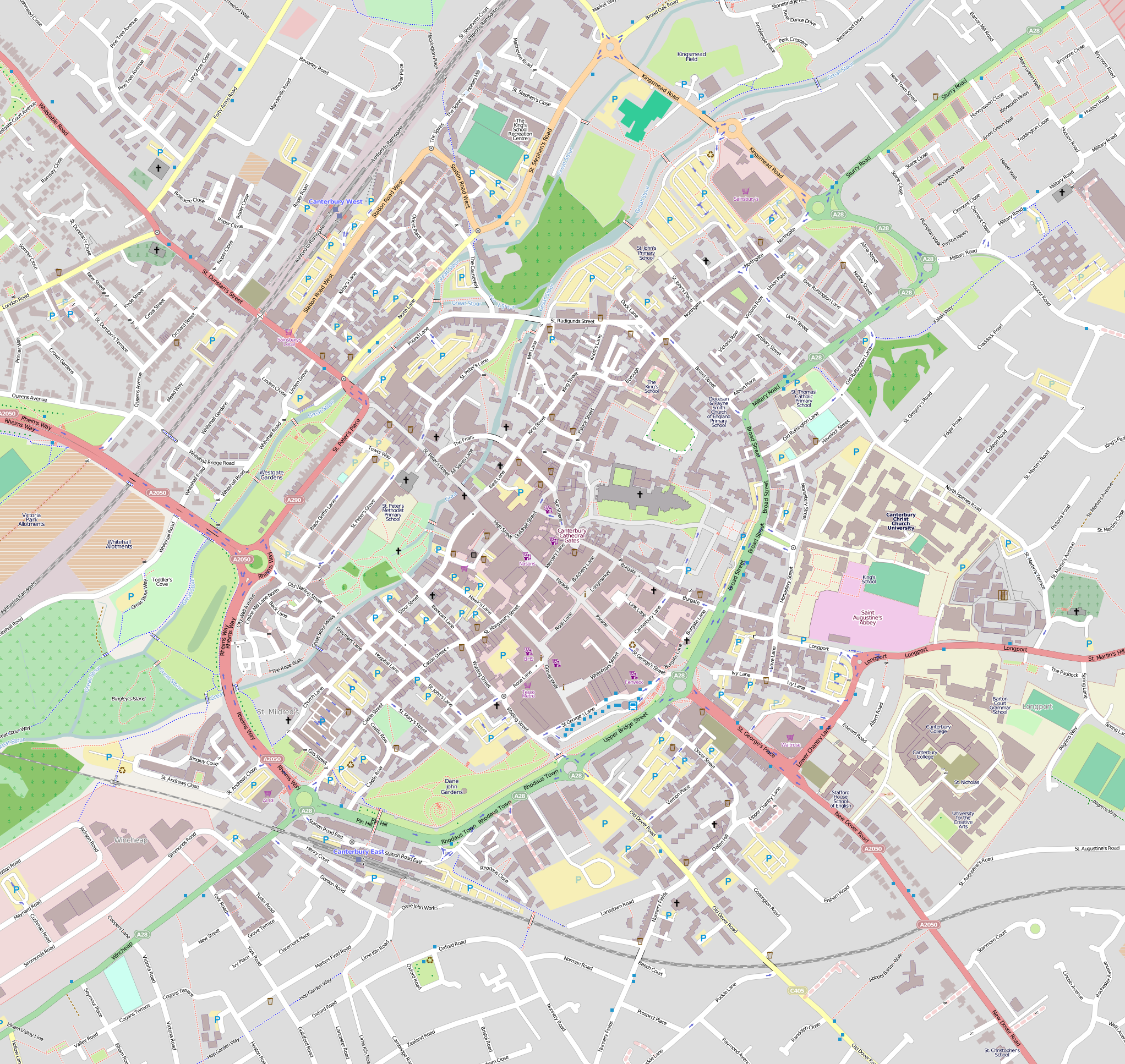
- Location of the former synagogue in Canterbury

Religion
- Affiliation: Orthodox Judaism (former)
- Rite: Nusach Ashkenaz
- Ecclesiastical or organizational status: Synagogue (1848–c. 1911); Church hall (1937–1982); School (since 1982)
- Status: Closed (as a synagogue); Repurposed

Location
- Location: 944 King Street, Canterbury, England
- Country: United Kingdom
- Interactive map of Old Synagogue, Canterbury
- Coordinates: 51°16′55″N 1°4′51″E

Architecture
- Architect: Hezekiah Marshall
- Type: Synagogue architecture
- Style: Egyptian Revival
- Established: 1720 (as a congregation)
- Completed: 1848

Specifications
- Length: 12 metres (40 ft)
- Width: 8.2 metres (27 ft)
- Height (max): 9.1 metres (30 ft)
- Materials: Portland cement

Listed Building – Grade II
- Official name: St Alphege Church Hall, King Street
- Type: Listed building
- Designated: 7 September 1973
- Reference no.: 1240866

The Old Synagogue is a former Orthodox Jewish congregation and synagogue, located at 944 King Street in Canterbury, Kent, England, in the United Kingdom. Established in 1720, the congregation worshiped in the Ashkenazi rite until it was dissolved in c. 1911. Between 2008 and 2004, a non-denominational Jewish community occasionally worshiped in the former synagogue.

The former synagogue building was completed in 1848 and restored in 1889. The building is considered to be the best example of a synagogue completed in the Egyptian Revival style, and was listed as a Grade II building in 1973. The building was used as a synagogue until c. 1911, sold in 1937 and subsequently used as a church hall and, since 1982, by The King's School for musical performances.

Although several synagogues and churches were built in the Egyptian Revival style in the early nineteenth century, only a few are known to survive, including the Hobart Synagogue in Tasmania, Australia, the Downtown Presbyterian Church, in Nashville, Tennessee and the First Presbyterian Church, in Sag Harbor, New York.

== History ==
=== Community ===
The earliest record of a Jewish community in Canterbury dates from 1160. The community is known to have been prosperous and to have traded in corn (grain) and wool as well as banking. Despite pogroms in 1261 and 1264, the community flourished until the Edict of Expulsion, given by Edward I of England in 1290. Its presence is commemorated in the street name, Jewry Lane.

A modern Jewish community is known to have existed in Canterbury by 1720. The present building was designed by Canterbury architect, Hezekiah Marshall, a Christian, and constructed in 1846–48. The synagogue replaced a 1763 building torn down to make place for the new railway built by the South Eastern Railway Company. The cornerstone of the 1848 building was laid by Sir Moses Montefiore in September 1847. A pair of columns with lotus capitals flank the doorway of the simple building, 12.2 by 8.2 metres (40 by 27 ft) by 9.1 metres (30 ft) high. The building is made of Portland cement, which gives the appearance of granite. There is a central bimah, the columns of which boast lotus-leaf capitals, and a women's balcony supported by Egyptian-style obelisks. The mikveh was described as "a miniature brick-faced temple set in the garden behind the synagogue". It is the only Egyptian Revival mikveh known to exist. The site is known to have been a hospice of the Knights Templar in medieval times.

In the earliest part of the 20th century, dwindling membership forced the synagogue to close. It is understood that regular services ceased in c. 1911, with the premises eventually sold in 1937.

=== The King's School ===
In 1982, The King's School, Canterbury purchased the Old Synagogue, and it serves as one of the school's music recital halls.

Since purchasing the Old Synagogue, The King's School has allowed members of the school's Jewish society gather at the Old Synagogue regularly for brief, informal Friday evening Shabbat meetings; and the small local non-denominational Jewish community had occasional use of the premises, up until c. 2004. Up until this time, events such as Passover Seders, Sukkoth, Purim and other social activities, as well as a Jewish wedding, were held on the grounds. In 2011, a Shabbat morning service and Torah reading was led by members of the University of Kent's Jewish Society and the university's Chabad rabbi.

== See also ==
- History of the Jews in England
- List of former synagogues in the United Kingdom
