= North Shore Synagogue =

Australian Modern Orthodox Jewish synagogue

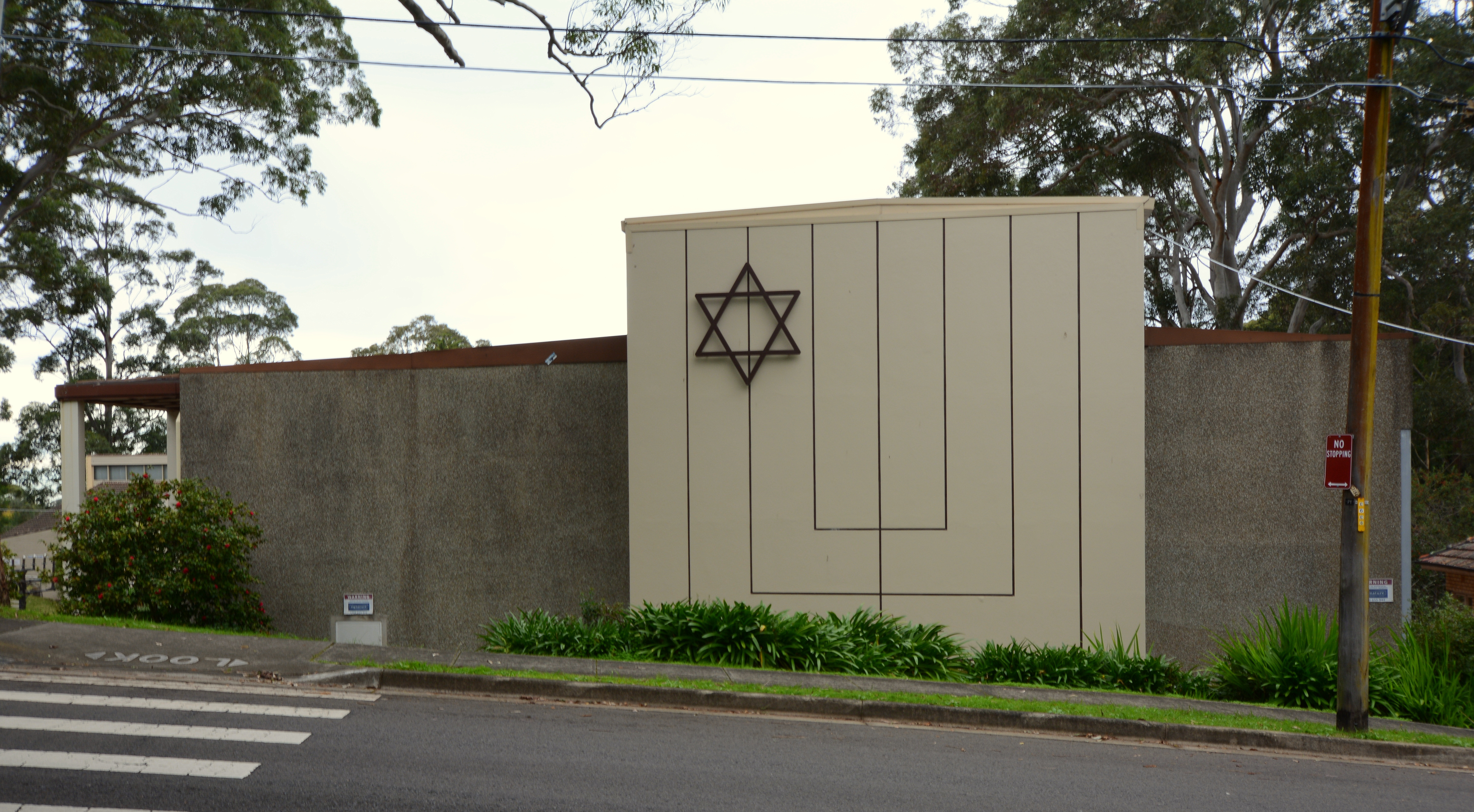
- Entrance to the synagogue in 2014

- Location in greater metropolitan Sydney

Religion
- Affiliation: Modern Orthodox Judaism
- Ecclesiastical or organizational status: Synagogue
- Ownership: Northern Sydney Hebrew Congregation
- Status: Active

Location
- Location: Treatts Road, Lindfield, Sydney, New South Wales
- Country: Australia
- Interactive map of North Shore Synagogue
- Coordinates: 33°46′16″S 151°09′55″E

Architecture
- Type: Synagogue architecture
- Established: 1947 (as a congregation)
- Completed: 1950; 76 years ago

Website
- www.nss.asn.au

The North Shore Synagogue is a Modern Orthodox Jewish synagogue located in the Sydney suburb of Lindfield, New South Wales, Australia. Founded in 1947, and having built its synagogue in 1950, it is the oldest synagogue on Sydney's North Shore.

== Overview ==
For thirty years the rabbi at the North Shore Synagogue was Rabbi David Rogut OAM who retired in 2003. The current Rabbi is Rabbi Paul Lewin. North Shore Synagogue also has a Chazan, Zvi Teichtahl who came to the synagogue in 2008. Past Chazans have been Rabbi Binyamin Tanny and Danny Sloman. The North Shore Synagogue contains a Choir, a Book group called "One Chapter at a Time" and a North Shore Jewish Women's group. The current president of the North Shore Synagogue is Ken Wolfsohn. Past presidents include Trevor Collins, Ken Wolfsohn, Sarah Zukerman, Calvin Stein and David Blitz. On Friday nights, Saturdays and religious festivals the synagogue conducts a children's service which is led by various youth over the age of fourteen.

The synagogue houses the Reverend Katz Library that has more than 5000 books available for the community to use.

== 1991 attempted arson attack ==
The North Shore Synagogue was one of five synagogues in Sydney targeted in a series of arson incidents, occurring between 26 January and 28 March 1991. Of the five synagogues attacked, the arsonists failed to set the North Shore Synagogue alight due to a security guard thwarting the incident. The guard was injured in the course of the attack.

== See also ==
- History of the Jews in Australia
- List of synagogues in Sydney
  - Great Synagogue (Sydney)
  - Central Synagogue (Sydney)
  - Emanuel Synagogue (Sydney)
  - Southern Sydney Synagogue
