= Hobart Synagogue =

Synagogue in Tasmania, Australia

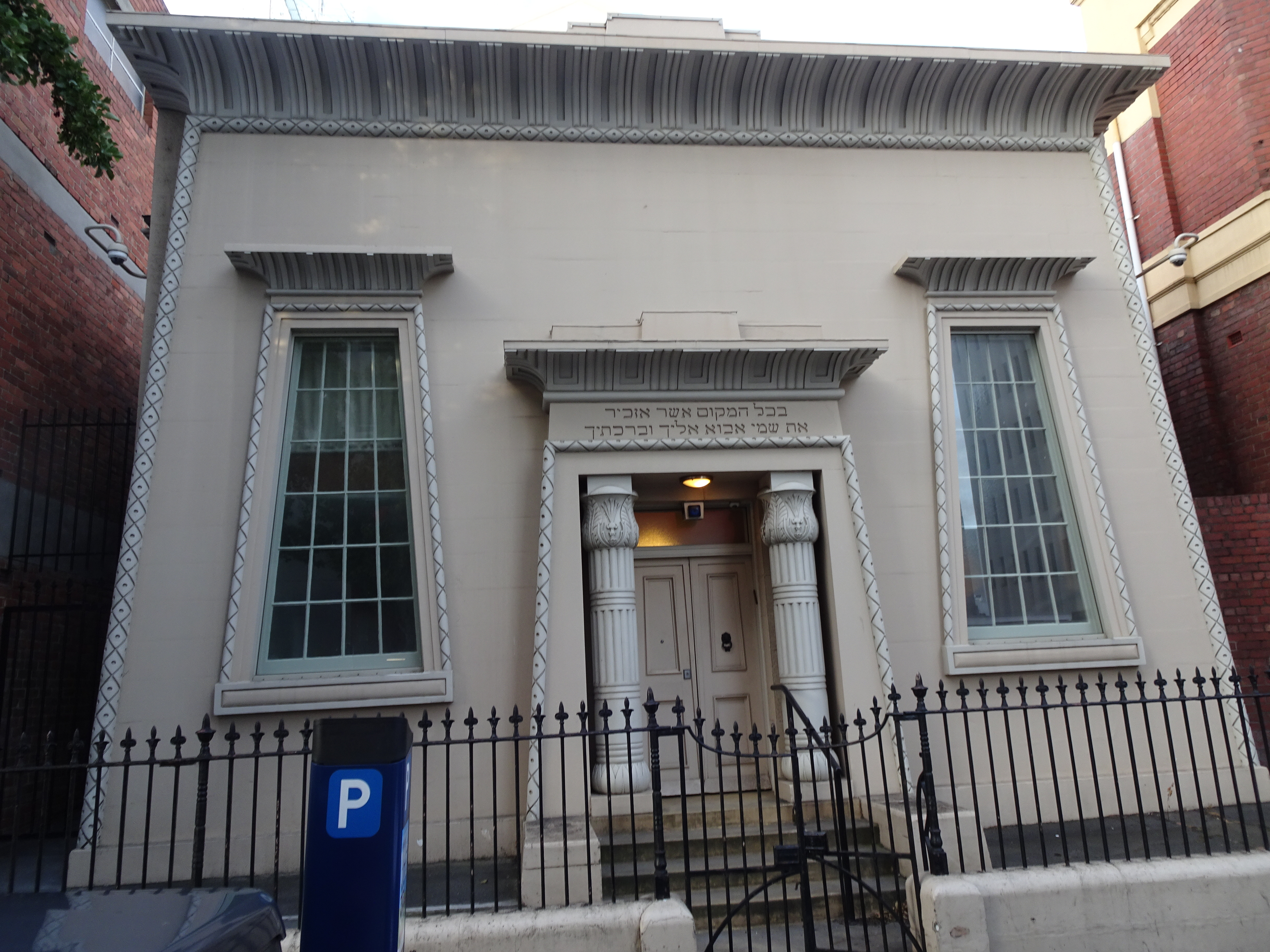
- The Hobart Synagogue

- Location in Hobart

Religion
- Affiliation: Judaism
- Rite: Orthodox and Progressive
- Ecclesiastical or organisational status: Synagogue
- Ownership: Hobart Hebrew Congregation
- Year consecrated: 1845
- Status: Active

Location
- Location: 59 Argyle Street, Hobart, Tasmania
- Country: Australia
- Coordinates: 42°52′47″S 147°19′41″E

Architecture
- Architect: James Thomson
- Type: Synagogue
- Style: Egyptian Revival
- Founder: Louis Nathan; Samuel Moses
- Completed: 1845; 181 years ago
- Tasmanian Heritage Register
- Reference no.: 2,150

Website
- www.hobartsynagogue.org

The Hobart Synagogue is a heritage-listed synagogue located in 59 Argyle Street, Hobart, Tasmania, Australia. The synagogue is the oldest synagogue building in Australia and is a rare example of Egyptian Revival style of synagogue architecture. The Egyptian Revival building was constructed in 1845. The trapezoidal shape of the windows and the columns with lotus capitals are characteristic of the Egyptian Revival style. Currently the Hobart Synagogue has regular Orthodox and Progressive services.

The land on which the synagogue stands was originally part of the garden of former convict Judah Solomon. It has a seating capacity of 150 and features hard benches at the back of the building for the Jewish convicts who in the early days were marched in under armed guard. It is believed to be the only place of Jewish worship in the world with seats set aside for convicts. The synagogue is listed on the Tasmanian Heritage Register.

== History ==
The building of a synagogue was raised as the Hobart Jewish community began to emerge in the 1830s. The Hobart Hebrew Congregation Synagogue was consecrated on 4 July 1845. The building was designed by Hobart Town architect James Thomson, who was a Scottish convict who was pardoned in 1829.

Although several synagogues and churches were built in the Egyptian Revival style in the early nineteenth century, only a few are known to survive, they include the Downtown Presbyterian Church, Nashville, the First Presbyterian Church, New York, the Old Synagogue at Canterbury, England and the Launceston Synagogue.

== Current usage ==
The synagogue is the focal point of Jewish culture in Hobart, and is the only structure owned by the community.

The community welcomes all Jews, and currently runs Orthodox and Progressive services.

The Tasmanian community reached a low point in the early 1970s when the census recorded fewer than 100 Jews in Hobart. The 2021 census recorded 376 Jews in Tasmania.

== Gallery ==
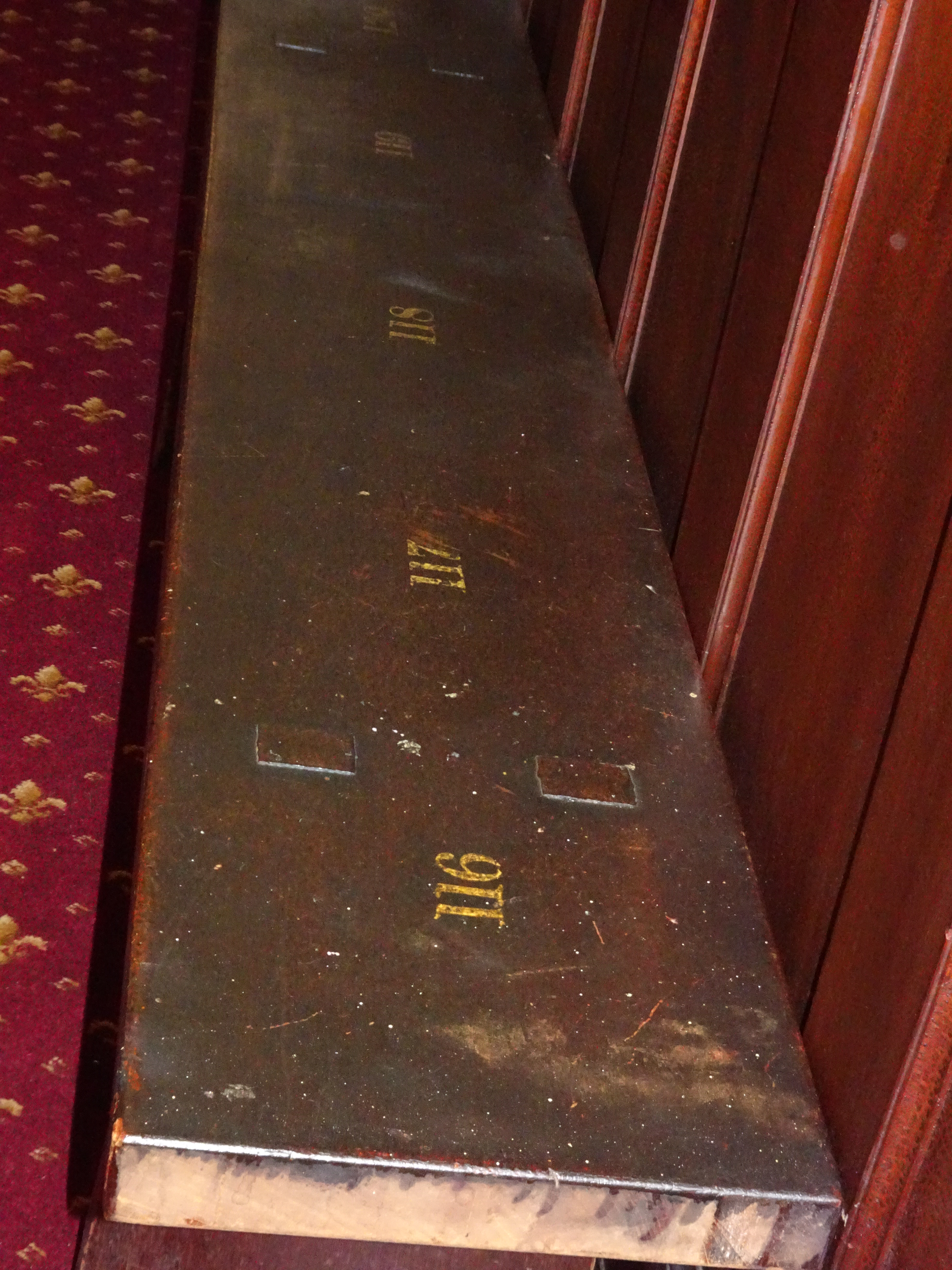
Convict bench

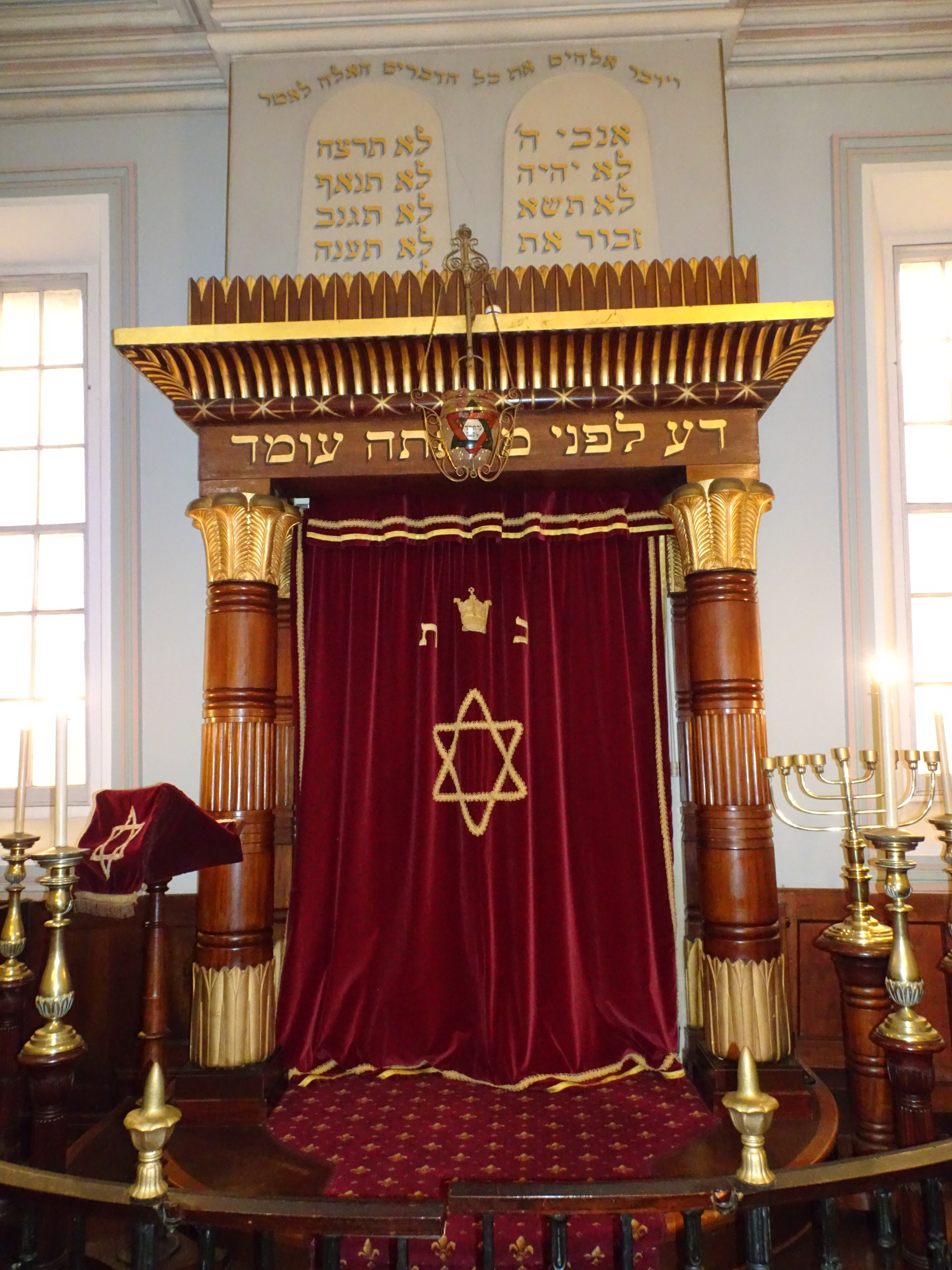
Ark

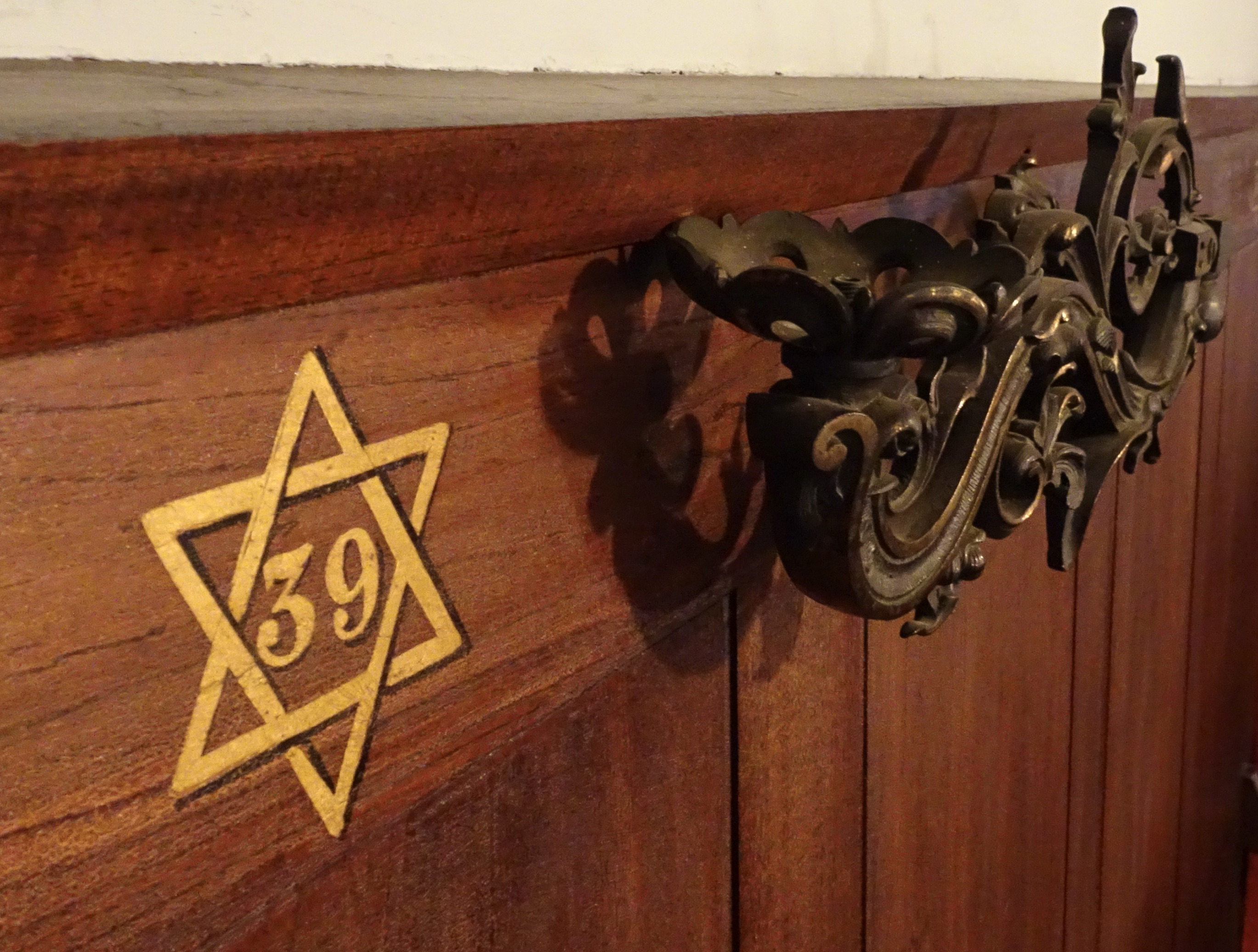
Seat number

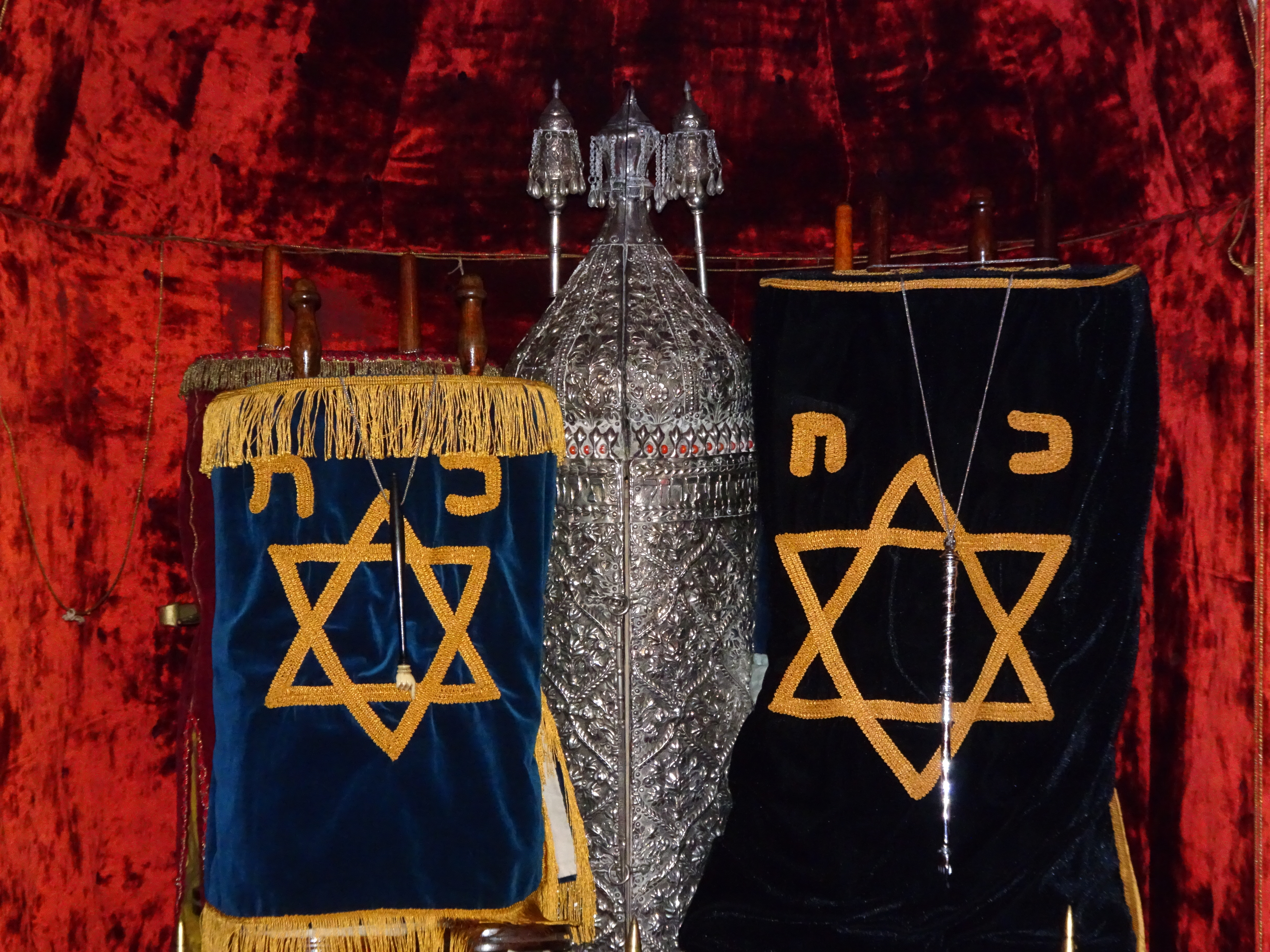
Torahs

== See also ==
- List of synagogues in Australia
- Oldest synagogues in the world
- History of the Jews in Australia
