= Launceston Synagogue =

Synagogue in Launceston, Tasmania, Australia

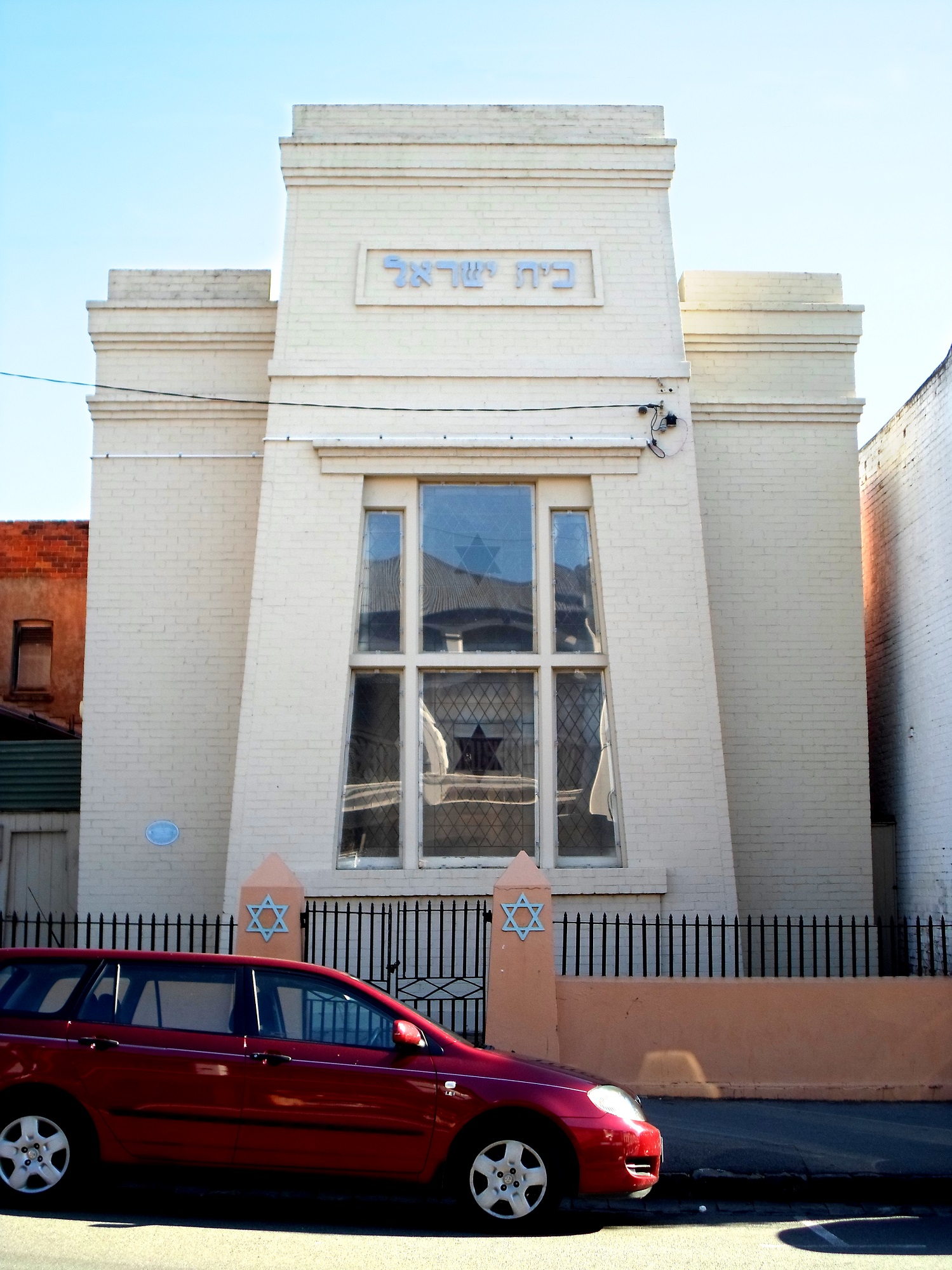
- Egyptian Revival-style synagogue in Launceston

- Location in Tasmania

Religion
- Affiliation: Judaism
- Ecclesiastical or organisational status: Synagogue: 1846–1871; c. 1930s–1961; since 1984
- Year consecrated: 1846
- Status: Active

Location
- Location: 126 St. John Street, Launceston, Tasmania
- Country: Australia
- Administration: National Trust of Australia
- Coordinates: 41°26′22.13″S 147°8′25″E

Architecture
- Architect: Richard Peter Lambeth
- Type: Synagogue architecture
- Style: Egyptian Revival
- Completed: 1846; 180 years ago
- Tasmanian Heritage Register
- Official name: Launceston Synagogue
- Builders: Barton and Bennell

The Launceston Synagogue is a heritage-listed building located in St. John Street, Launceston, Tasmania, Australia, that served as a synagogue from 1846 until 1871, and again during the c. 1930s until its closure in 1961 and reopened in 1984.

== History ==
In the 1840s the sizeable Launceston Hebrew Congregation borrowed £500 to purchase the land to build the synagogue. The synagogue was designed by Richard Peter Lambeth and was built in 1844 by Tasmanian builders Barton and Bennell. The synagogue was consecrated in 1846.

After the Hobart Synagogue, the building is Australia's second-oldest synagogue, the oldest place of non-Christian worship in Launceston, and a rare example of Egyptian Revival architecture in Australia. The building features a distinctly trapezoidal facade and main window bearing the Star of David with a single balcony on the inside accessed via the rear of the building.

The synagogue closed as a house of worship in 1871, re-opening again in the 1930s. In 1923, Sim Crawcour and Harry Joseph were instrumental in its renovation.

In 1989, the building became listed with National Trust of Australia who have been taking care of renovations and maintenance.

== Convicts ==
In 1847 it was arranged that all Jews in Hobart and Launceston prisons should have the privilege of attending synagogue and refraining from work on the Sabbath. Pass holders were permitted to be counted in a minyan, but they could not have honors bestowed on them.

== See also ==
- List of synagogues in Australia
- History of the Jews in Australia
