= Emanuel Synagogue (Sydney) =

Pluralist synagogue in New South Wales, Australia

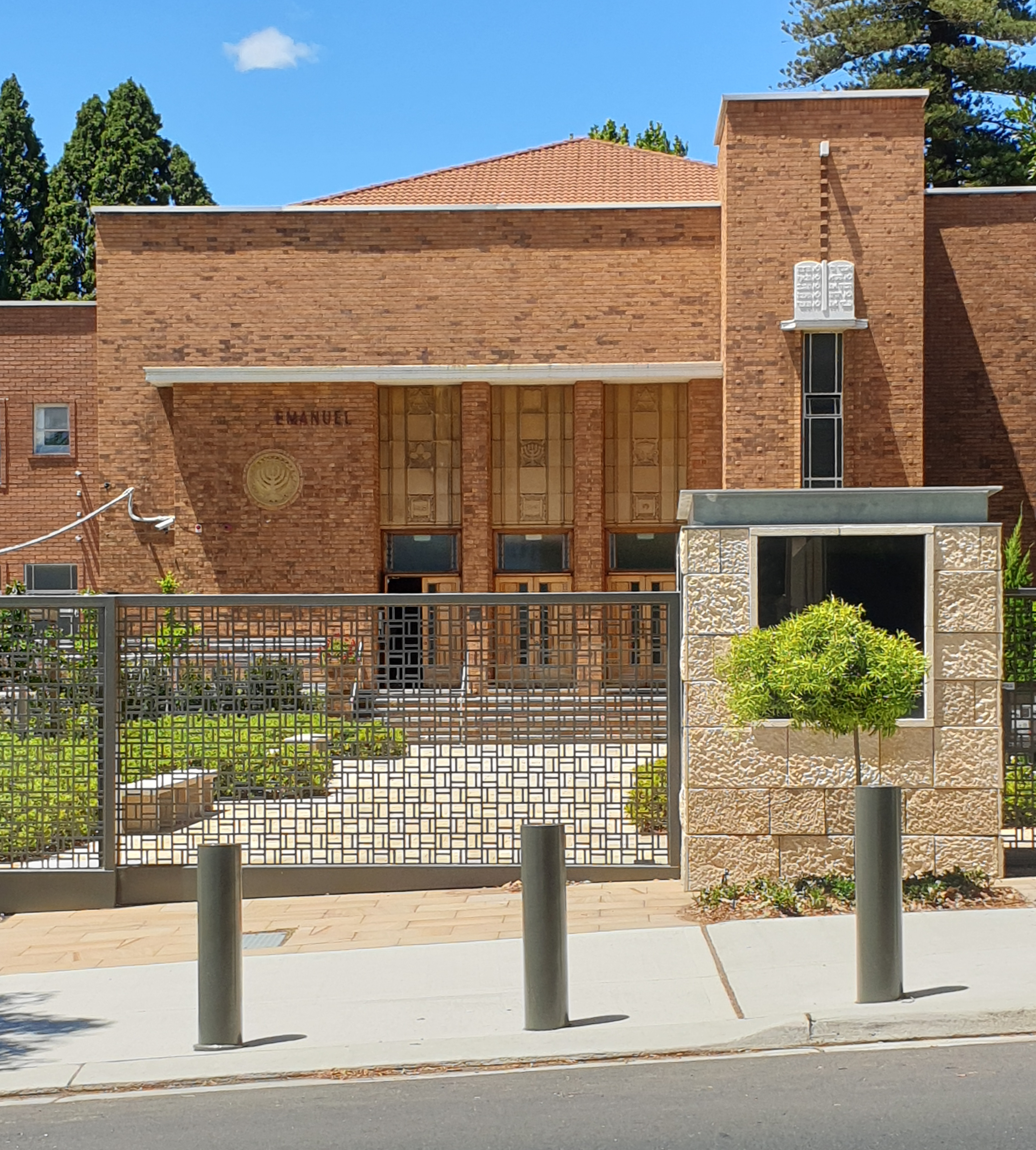

- Location in greater metropolitan Sydney

Religion
- Affiliation: Reform Judaism
- Rite: Progressive, Masorti and Renewal
- Ecclesiastical or organizational status: Synagogue
- Status: Active

Location
- Location: Ocean Street, Woollahra, Sydney, New South Wales
- Country: Australia
- Interactive map of Emanuel Synagogue
- Coordinates: 33°53′20″S 151°14′27″E

Architecture
- Type: Synagogue architecture
- Founder: General Paul Cullen
- Completed: 1938; 88 years ago

Emanuel Synagogue, founded as The Congregation of the Temple Emanuel in 1938, is a Pluralist synagogue in Woollahra, New South Wales, Australia. Emanuel Woollahra Preschool (founded as Temple Emanuel Kindy in 1956) is located on the synagogue campus. Emanuel Synagogue is the largest congregation in Australia with more than 3,500 members offering programs and services across the Progressive, Masorti and Renewal streams of Judaism.

Australia's well-known General, Paul Cullen, was instrumental in the temple's founding, including helping to select its first rabbi.

In May 2018, the synagogue was the first Australian Jewish synagogue to host a gay wedding.

== See also ==
- Judaism in Australia
- List of synagogues in Sydney
  - Great Synagogue (Sydney)
  - Central Synagogue (Sydney)
  - North Shore Synagogue
  - Southern Sydney Synagogue
