= Moses Rintel =

Australian Jewish rabbi (1823–1880)

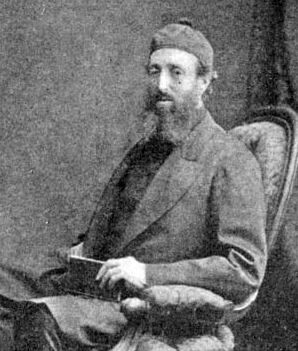
Moses Rintel, a rabbi in colonial Victoria (Australia)

The Reverend Moses Rintel, S.J.M., (1823 – 9 May 1880) was a rabbi in colonial Victoria (Australia) who established the first Beth din (rabbinical court) in the British Empire outside London.

Rintel was born in Edinburgh, Scotland, during the time that his father, Rev. Myer Rintel, was minister of the Hebrew congregation. Moses was the first duly authorised Jewish clergyman to come out to the colony.

Rintel arrived in Sydney in 1844, where he established the Sydney Hebrew Academy, of which he became the principal. In 1849 he accepted the office of minister of the newly established Jewish congregation of Melbourne, subject to the approval of the Rev. Chief Rabbi, Dr. Adler, which was soon after obtained. He married, the same year, a Miss Elvina Hart, and had had a family of nine children.

Circumstances compelled him to resign his charge following a split in the congregation that led to the formation of the East Melbourne Hebrew Congregation, where he was appointed minister.

In the year 1864, mainly through his exertions, a duly constituted Beth Din, the only one out of London, was established, of which he acted as the chairman; and in 1868 the Chief Rabbi of Great Britain and its dependencies assigned to him the position and title of Senior Minister of the Melbourne Hebrew community.

For many years he took a deep interest in the Melbourne Jewish Philanthropic Society, in which he has not only held all the various offices, but has, on more than one occasion, been elected its president. Through his efforts this society was allowed to participate in the Government grant in aid of charitable institutions, and for which the members voted him a very handsome testimonial. He, with a few others, founded the United Friends' Jewish Benefit Society in 1856, of which he became the first president. His sphere of usefulness was not limited to matters in connection with his own faith; he has been for many years past and still continues to be connected with various societies and institutions. He was one of the founders of the Benevolent Asylum, and acted as Grand Chaplain from 1850.

Rintel died in Melbourne on 9 May 1880.
