= Brisbane Synagogue =

Synagogue in Brisbane, Australia

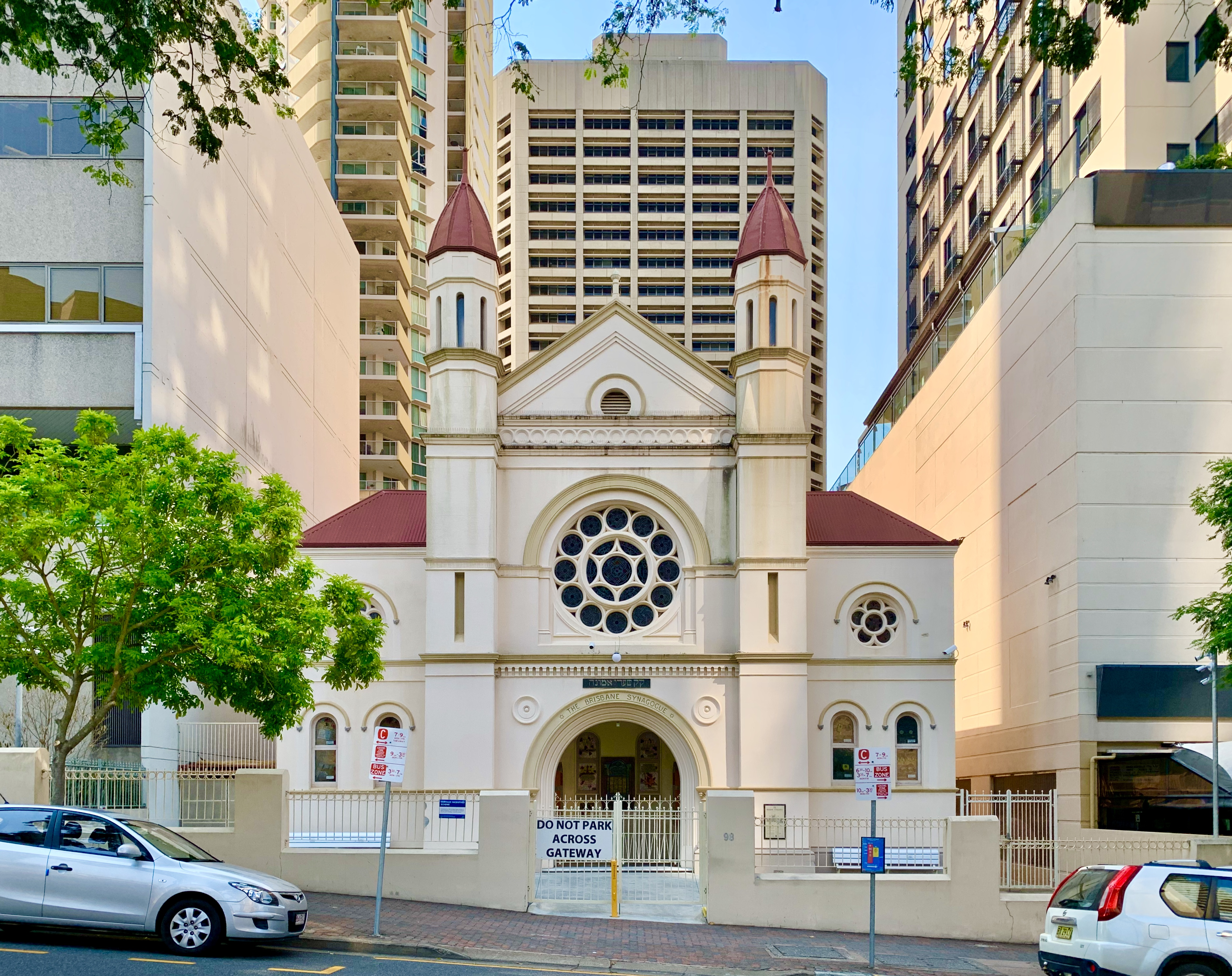
- Brisbane Synagogue, 2019

- Location within Queensland Location within Australia

Religion
- Affiliation: Modern Orthodox Judaism
- Ecclesiastical or organisational status: Synagogue
- Ownership: Brisbane Hebrew Congregation
- Status: Active

Location
- Location: 98 Margaret Street, Brisbane City, City of Brisbane
- State: Queensland
- Country: Australia
- Coordinates: 27.4733°S 153.0269°E

Architecture
- Architect: Arthur Morry
- Type: Synagogue architecture
- Established: c. 1870s–c. 1890s (late 19th century)
- Completed: 1885; 141 years ago
- Queensland Heritage Register
- Official name: The Brisbane Synagogue
- Type: State heritage (built)
- Designated: 21 October 1992
- Reference no.: 600127
- Significant period: 1885–1886 (fabric)
- Significant components: Stained glass window/s, furniture/fittings, tower – minaret, gallery
- Builders: Arthur Midson

Website
- brisbanehebrewcongregation.com

The Brisbane Synagogue is a Modern Orthodox Jewish congregation and heritage-listed synagogue, located at 98 Margaret Street, Brisbane City, City of Brisbane, Queensland, Australia. It was designed by Arthur Morry and built from 1885 to 1886 by Arthur Midson. It was added to the Queensland Heritage Register on 21 October 1992.

== History ==
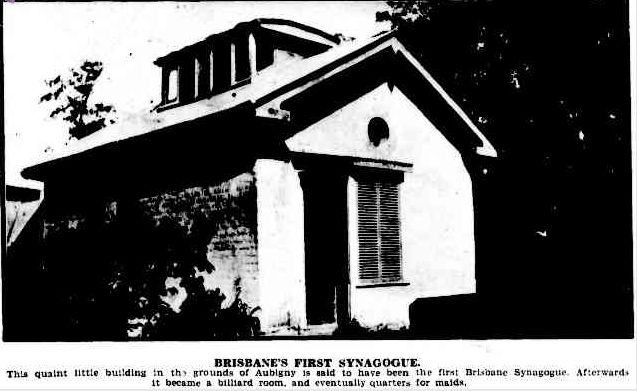
Stables at Aubigny, North Quay, 1930, incorrectly identified as Brisbane's first synagogue.

The Jewish families who settled in Queensland from the time of Separation formed the nucleus of the Brisbane Hebrew Congregation founded in Brisbane in 1865. As an interim measure, the congregation worshipped in a number of venues in Queen Street, Edward Street, George Street, and Albert Street. For a long time, the stables building in the grounds of Samuel Davis's home at North Quay (later known as Aubigny) was incorrectly believed to have been the site of the first synagogue. Meanwhile, they were raising money through various land speculations to purchase a site and build a synagogue. The present site was purchased by R. B. Lewin and sold to the congregation for £200. In 1885, designs for a synagogue were sought from architects and plans submitted by Edward Wells Russell were accepted. Russell however decided not to undertake the commission, but instead transferred his ownership of the design to his brother-in-law, Arthur Morry, who worked in the Queensland Colonial Architect's office. The foundation stone was laid on 7 July 1885 and a bottle containing coins, newspapers and documents was embedded beneath it. The foundation stone is no longer visible following the raising of the level of Margaret Street, and it is believed that the courtyard of the synagogue was raised at the same time. This is supported by the fact that ventilated arches for the basement are now located well below ground level.

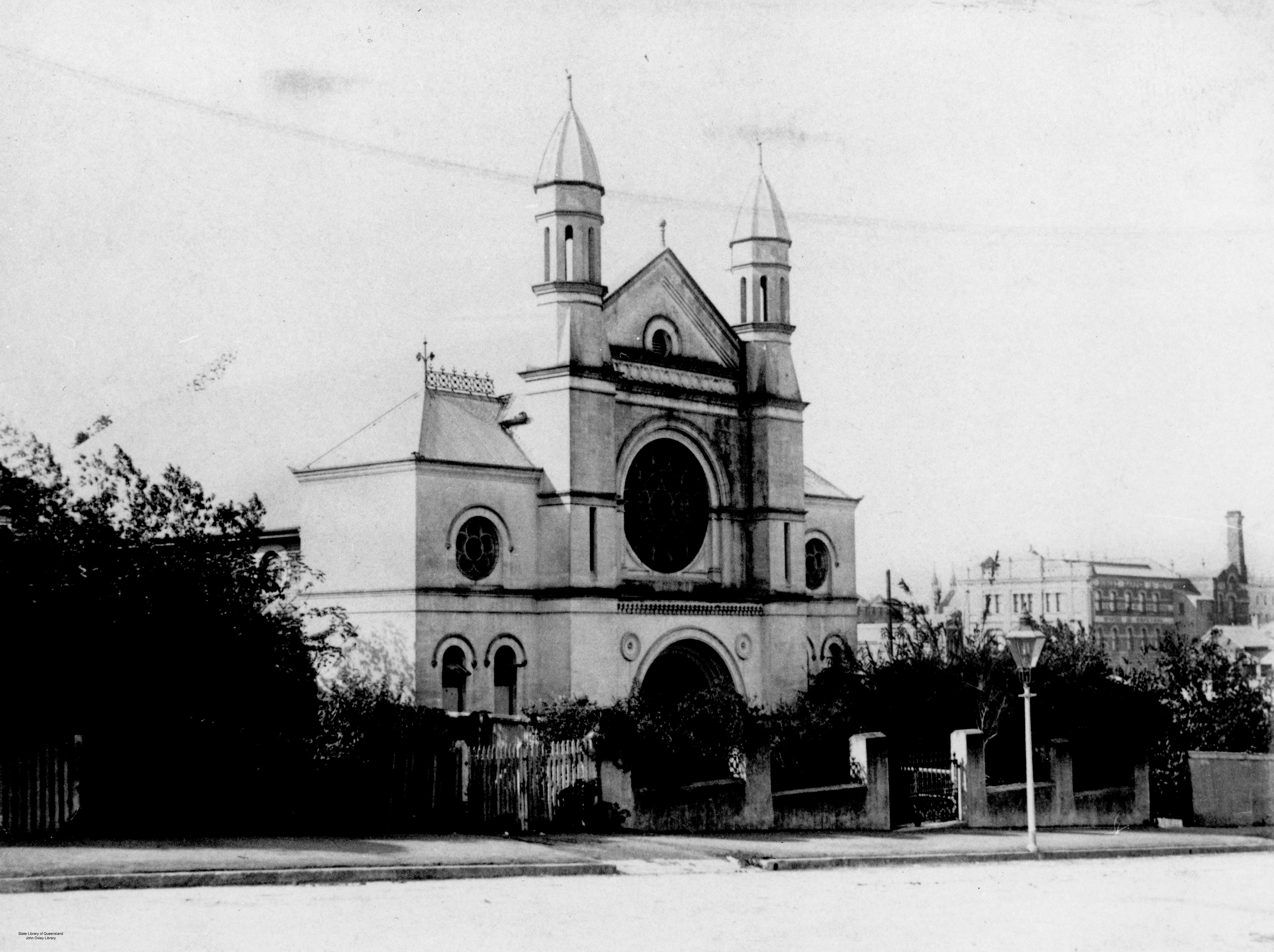
Brisbane Synagogue, circa 1906

Arthur Midson, a prominent building contractor, built the synagogue for the sum of £6450. It was finally consecrated on 18 July 1886 in a ceremony of "the most imposing and interesting character" which was "crowded to excess" by people of all faiths. The building features a large circular geometric tracery window of Oamaru stone above the Margaret Street arched doorway. The stained glass lead lighting was obtained from Messrs Lyon, Cottier & Co of Sydney. The window is flanked on either side by a minaret turret which rose to a height of 90 feet (27 m) from the original ground level. The rendered brick structure, constructed on concrete foundations, contains a basement, a nave and side aisles on the ground floor with a minister's retiring or robe room at the rear. In accordance with traditional Jewish religious practices the sexes are separated during worship, with a gallery level for females only. It contains 140 seats and two women's retiring rooms.

The synagogue remained largely unaltered over the years. Prior to the centenary celebrations of the Brisbane Jewish community in 1965, considerable renovations were carried out, including new school rooms in 1906, a purpose-built hall with a retractable roof enabling the celebration of the harvest festival of Sukkot in the 1920s, a grand two-story Memorial Hall for social and educational functions in 1955 and the installation of additional stained glass windows. Many of these were donated by congregation members whose families were murdered in the Holocaust (World War II). The words "The Brisbane Synagogue" and the congregation's spiritual name "Kehilla Kedosha Sha'ari Emuna" (The Holy Congregation of the Gates of Faith) were added over the arched entry during 1967–1968. In 1986 stained glass windows commemorating the Holocaust and stories from the Torah were added.

On 20 February 2026, a man targeted the synagogue in a vehicle-ramming attack, no one was injured during the incident, but the gates of the synagogue were damaged.Queensland Police later charged 32-year-old Matthew De Campo with wilful damage, serious vilification or hate crime, dangerous driving, and possession of a dangerous drug, treating it as a hate-motivated incident rather than terrorism.

The State Library of Queensland holds the Brisbane Hebrew Congregation minute books for the years 1865 to 1931.

== Description ==
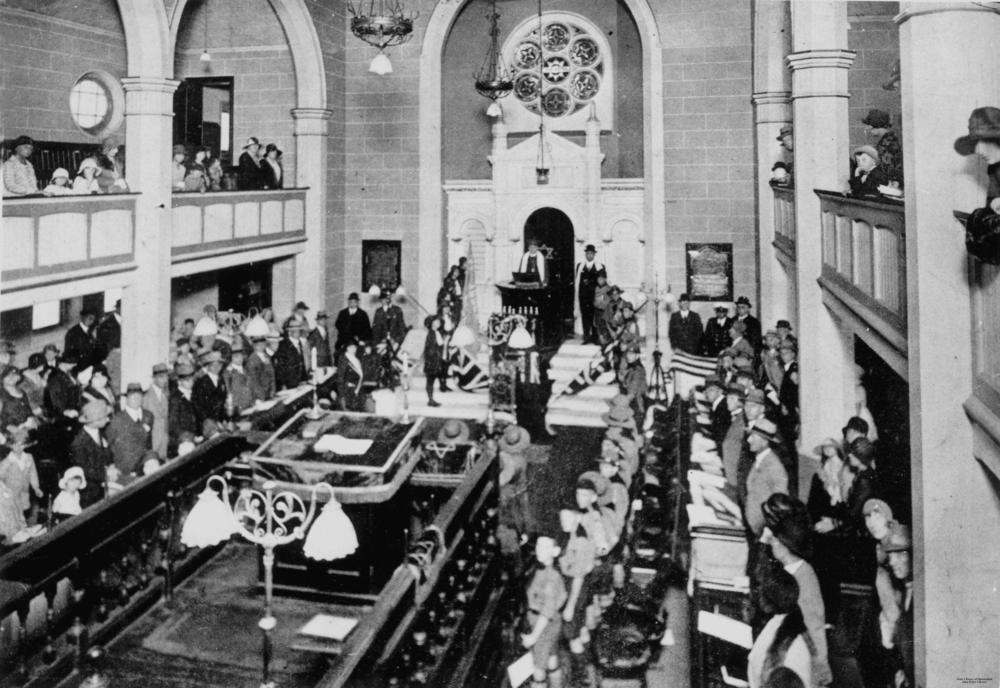
Interior of the Brisbane Synagogue during the 1930 Anzac Day ceremony

The building is constructed of stuccoed brickwork on a concrete foundation. The principal feature of the Margaret Street frontage is a doorway surmounted by a massive arch above which is a large circular tracery window of Oamaru stone. The window carries the circular motif through to the geometry of the tracery, and features leadlight panels. The front is flanked on either side by a minaret turret that becomes octagonal in its upper portion with narrow slit openings, and is topped by an octagonal cupola. The end gable above the entry has a central circular ventilator below which is a frieze also including a circular motif. The portions of the building recessed to either side of the entry also have circular tracery windows in recessed arched openings at the upper level. Below these openings on each side are a pair of Romanesque arched windows.

The main stepped broad arch of the entry is supported on small Corinthian columns with the front section at the top of the arch inscribed with the words "THE BRISBANE SYNAGOGUE". Above this is an ornamental row of dentils, and to either side geometrical rosettes. The back wall of the building also has a large circular tracery window of Oamaru stone. The side walls have large swinging windows to provide cross ventilation.

The building was designed to accommodate 400 people, 260 of them on the ground floor and the remainder on the upper level women's gallery which extends over the entry and down both sides. The interior is divided into a nave and side aisles by large octagonal columns with moulded caps and cement bases. Broad semi-circular arches span between the capitals. The ceiling consists of timber boarding with circular fretwork ventilators evenly spaced down the centre. The gallery is supported on small trusses and is approached by two flights of stairs, one at the front and the other at the rear. The seating on both levels is stepped and faces the centre where there is a carved timber platform. An arched recess approached by stone steps is located in the end wall. This has a circular tracery window above it, and is flanked on either side by marble plaques. Brightly coloured stained glass is situated in the circular windows on the gallery level and also the arched lower openings.

== Heritage listing ==
The Brisbane Synagogue was listed on the Queensland Heritage Register on 21 October 1992 having satisfied the following criteria.

The place is important in demonstrating the evolution or pattern of Queensland's history.

The Brisbane Synagogue is Brisbane's first purpose built synagogue, and is significant as an important development in nineteenth century Jewish worship in the city. The building reflects the development of Jewish settlement in the city during the 1880s.

The place demonstrates rare, uncommon or endangered aspects of Queensland's cultural heritage.

The addition of windows are a rare Brisbane memorial to Jewish people who died in the Second World War.

The place has potential to yield information that will contribute to an understanding of Queensland's history.

Located within the foundation stone cavity are artefacts and memorabilia which have the potential for yielding information about the Jewish community in the 1880s.

The place is important in demonstrating the principal characteristics of a particular class of cultural places.

The Brisbane Synagogue is significant as an example of the design work of Arthur Morry, prominent Brisbane architect, and of Arthur Midson, local building contractor. As an example of Australian-Jewish places of worship, the Brisbane Synagogue typifies the customs and liturgical practices of the Hebrew community.

The place is important because of its aesthetic significance.

As a free-standing element with an entry porch, the building contributes to the streetscape of Margaret Street.

The place is important in demonstrating a high degree of creative or technical achievement at a particular period.

The adaption in its design of both circular and octagonal elements to a traditional plan form to create a style suitable for an inner-city synagogue.

The place has a strong or special association with a particular community or cultural group for social, cultural or spiritual reasons.

The building also has special significance to Brisbane's Hebrew community.

== See also ==
- History of the Jews in Australia
- List of synagogues in Australia
