= Yehoram Ulman =

USSR-born Australian rabbi

Rabbi Yehoram Ulman
- יהורם אולמאן
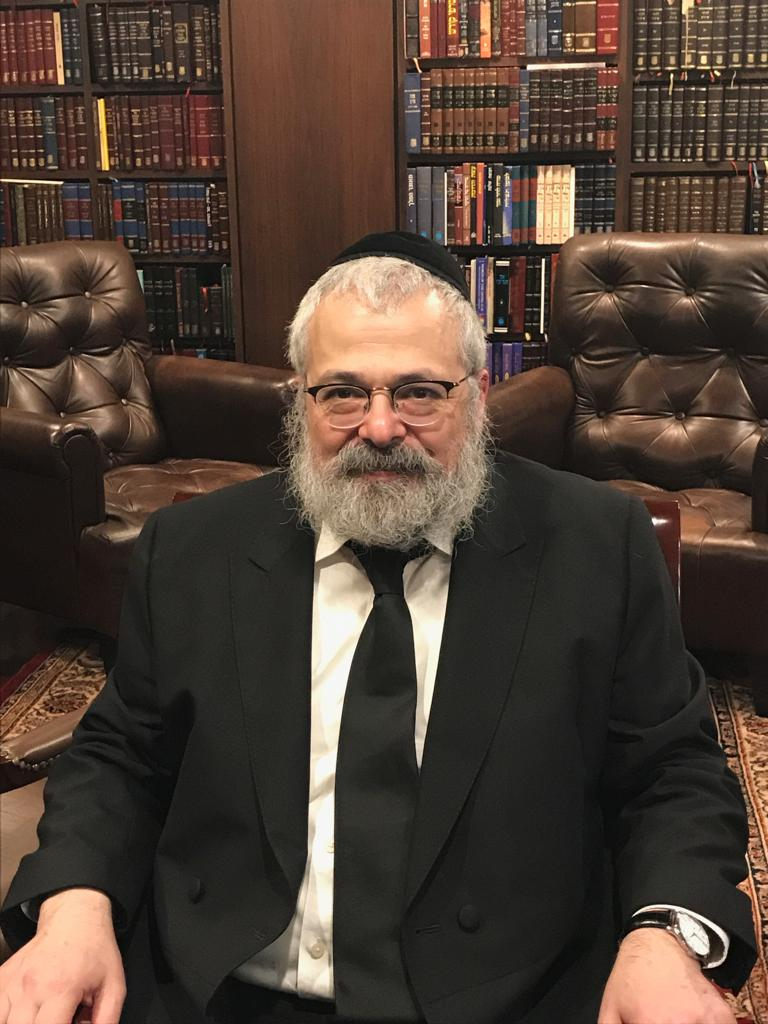
- Yehoram Ulman, 2019

Personal life
- Born: 1964 (age 61–62) Leningrad, RSSR, Soviet Union
- Dynasty: Chabad
- Occupation: Rabbi and Dayan
- Relatives: Eli Schlanger (son in law)

Religious life
- Religion: Judaism
- Philosophy: Chabad philosophy
- Sect: Orthodox Judaism; Hasidic Judaism
- Jurisprudence: Sydney Beth Din
- Movement: Chabad

Jewish leader
- Based in: East Sydney
- Position: Senior Dayan at Sydney Beth Din
- Synagogue: Chabad of Bondi
- Organisation: Friends of Refugees of Eastern Europe (F.R.E.E.)
- Dynasty: Chabad
- Criminal information
- Organisation: Sydney Beth Din
- Style: Religious persecution and obstruction of secular courts
- Opponent: Reuven Barukh
- Criminal charge: Contempt of court
- Penalty: $10,000 fine (reduced from $50,000 on appeal); + court costs
- Accomplices: Moshe Gutnick; Michael Chriqui; Eli Schlanger

Details
- Country: Australia
- State: New South Wales
- Location: Sydney's Jewish community
- Target: Jews using secular courts

Yehoram Ulman is a rabbi in Sydney, Australia. Born in Leningrad, USSR in 1964, he holds a number of senior positions in the Orthodox Jewish community.

== F.R.E.E. and Chabad of Bondi ==
Ulman is the Rabbi of Friends of Refugees of Eastern Europe (FREE), which has been servicing Sydney's Russian-speaking community since 1986. FREE attempts to connect many of the thousands of immigrants from the former USSR to their Jewish roots. In this role Ulman has presided over many adult circumcisions, as they were forbidden in the USSR.

In September 2024 Chabad of Bondi held a grand opening for their new community centre and synagogue. At the time, Ulman was Chabad of Bondi's spiritual leader,and his son-in-law, Rabbi Eli Schlanger, was Chabad of Bondi's Assistant Rabbi. The event also marked the completion of a brand new Sefer Torah.

== Sydney Beth Din ==
Ulman is the senior member of the Sydney Beth Din and owns in partnership with the other senior dayan, Moshe Gutnick. The Beth Din has jurisdiction over Orthodox conversions and divorces. More recently the Beth Din making efforts to be the sole arbiter of who is a Jew in Sydney.

After the leaking of a secret document from the Israeli Chief Rabbinate it was revealed that the Sydney Beth Din, with Ulman as the senior rabbi, was one of the few Beth Dins around the world that were recognised to perform conversions. After a number of Australian rabbis were placed on a secret Israeli blacklist, Ulman interceded on behalf of one of them to have him removed from the list, even though the Israeli courts are expressing an ultra-Orthodox viewpoint not in keeping with a majority of Australian Jews.

The Sydney Beth Din and Ulman specifically have received criticism from the secular judiciary in Australia. They have had a number of their decisions overturned and have lost some appeals. The Rabbinical Council of NSW, of which Ulman was a vice president at the time, issued a ruling that forbade any dispute with a Jewish institution from going to the courts, unless mediation had failed.

In 2013 a ruling of the Beth Din against a Sydney man, Benjamin Amzalak, was overturned in the state Supreme Court. The ruling included an excommunication order that called on the community to "expel his children from school and his wife from synagogue". Ulman did not sign this excommunication letter, It was only signed by Rabbis Telsner and Kaminetsky. In a transcript of the Beth Din's deliberations, Ulman was recorded as saying in Yiddish "I am already persuaded, [but] so that we do not give the appearance of impropriety, let us give him [Amzalak] some time to answer".

Ulman was also involved in the siruv (Jewish contempt of court order) of South Caulfield Hebrew Congregation in Melbourne. The dispute began when the congregation reduced the salary of their existing rabbi and member of the Melbourne Beth Din, Yacov Barber. The ruling excommunicated all members of the board and prevented any rabbi or clergy from assisting the congregation in any way. The siruv was later lifted.

=== Contempt of court case ===
In another case Ulman was one of four rabbis from the Beth Din, who were found to be in contempt of court for threatening sanctions on Reuven Barukh if he took his case to the secular courts and did not first attend the Beth Din. The other three were Moshe Gutnick, Michael Chriqi, and Eli Schlanger. The letter, sent on behalf of all the individuals on the Beth Din stated that "all members of the Jewish faith are obliged to have their disputes heard in accordance with Jewish Law at a Beth Din" and that Jews are "not permitted to seek adjudication at a civil court without the express permission of a Beth Din". The judge in his ruling stated that their behaviour "displays either arrogant disregard of their own procedures and rules of natural justice, substantial ineptitude, or inexperience dealing with commercial disputes".

The rabbis involved appealed the case, and although the fines were reduced to $25,000 from $50,000, they were still expected to pay costs for the case which were expected to be $350,000. The fine was later reduced to $10,000 for Ulman, and the others also had their fines reduced.

In the aftermath of this ruling the Rabbinical Council of Australia and New Zealand (RCANZ) committed to an internal review, although a statement from the Rabbinical Council of NSW rejected the judgment calling the ruling a "serious violation of religious freedom, a principle that Australia holds dear". RCANZ later changed their stance and rejected the calls for the rabbis of the Beth Din to stand down.

The Sydney Beth Din of which Ulman is a senior member, released a statement stating that Jews must go to a Beth Din to settle matters with other Jews and they should not go to secular courts. In their statement they said that this is a fundamental core religious principle, and that removing the power of the Beth Din to force Jews to come before them "sets a precedent that affects... our ability, as Jews, to freely practice our religion".

In March 2019 the NSW Jewish Board of Deputies (JBOD) intended to investigate the Beth Din which Ulman is a part owner and senior member. The resolution which was passed unopposed was to look into all aspects of the Beth Din in connection to this case. JBOD said that the Beth Din had a "history of effectively undermining the theological basis of Orthodoxy and halachah," and that there were serious "defects in the ownership structure, governance, mechanisms of accountability and dispute-resolution processes" and that they were a law unto themselves. The Beth Din responded that JBOD had a "this attempt by the BOD to assert authority over the SBD creates an insurmountable conflict of interest for the BOD, a body with a history of effectively undermining the theological basis of Orthodoxy and halachah". They rejected the concept that JBOD "has any right to be involved in, to interfere with or comment on the affairs of an Orthodox rabbinical body".

In 2021, the final report by JBOD was released, which called for the beth din to be reformed.

== Views on health and sexuality ==
He is responsible for Kosher IVF in a number of cities across the globe including, Chicago, NY, Caracas, Panama and others.

Ulman was one of the signatories to a letter to the Prime Minister opposing marriage equality, even in the secular context. The other Jewish signatories were fellow Sydney Beth Din member, Moshe Gutnick and senior rabbi on the Melbourne Beth Din, Mordechai Gutnick. In a submission to the Senate inquiry into same sex marriage, to which Ulman was a signatory, homosexuality was compared to adultery, incest and bestiality.

Ulman's knowledge and expertise is viewed highly in the Chabad communities around the world. He is a reference point for family purity, organ tissue donation, as well as running an international institute for Dayanut. He has also taken a stance in favour of medicinal marijuana, and is publicly in favour of reporting child sexual abuse.

In 2020, Ulman advocated for using Hydroxychloroquine to treat COVID-19, saying that it had "saved thousands".

== Criminal trials and prisoners ==
Ulman supplied written testimony to court on behalf of Jaron Chester, who was accused of money laundering for an alleged Sydney organised crime family. While the organised communal leadership distanced themselves from Chester, Ulman testified as a character witness and called Chester a "very fine boy".

Ulman is the Jewish Chaplain for the NSW corrections serving all Jewish inmates with their religious needs including: attending court hearings, supplying references, organising packages and meals for the holidays.

== Death of Rabbi Eli Schlanger ==
After the 2025 Bondi Beach shooting, during which his son-in-law Rabbi Eli Schlanger was murdered, Ulman said "hatred for Zionism is hatred for the Jewish people". and that those who attack us are "animals who look like humans". The attack was carried out by two men from Sydney, who had a long history of suspected support for ISIS. The police alleged that the two men condemned the acts of "Zionists" in a manifesto video found on the younger man's phone, but the video has not been released to the public.

Schlanger's funeral was held at the Chabad of Bondi synagogue. The opening prayers were said by Israel's Diaspora Affairs Minister Amichai Chikli. After this, Ulman spoke very emotionally about his son-in-law. The funeral was also attended by current Australian politicians and former Australian Prime Minister Scott Morrison

Jewish law usually forbids bringing a coffin into a synagogue for a funeral, but an exception was made for Schlanger's coffin. Chabad regard Schlager as a great leader and a holy martyr.

=== Politicians who attended the funeral ===
- Amichai Chikli, Likud Party, Israel's Diaspora Affairs Minister
- Julian Leeser, Liberal Party, federal member (MP) for Berowra
- Sussan Ley, Liberal Party, federal Opposition Leader
- Chris Minns, Labor Party, Premier of New South Wales
- Scott Morrison, Liberal Party, Former prime minister of Australia
- Kellie Sloane, Leader of the NSW Liberal Party
- Allegra Spender, Independent federal member member (MP) for Wentworth

== Writing ==
Ulman has published a collection of some of his halachic cases in a book titled "Milishkas HaDarom" (Hebrew: מלשכת הדרום).

== See also ==
- Aryeh Levin (1885–1969) – Prison Rabbi in British Palatine
- Yaakov Goldman (1906–1986) – Prison Rabbi in the British Army
