= James Kennard =

- James Kennard, Australian educator, Rabbi, and local community leader
- Born: 24 June 1964 (age 62)
- Occupation: Educational Consultant
- Website: www.rabbikennard.com

Rabbi James Kennard (born 24 June 1964) is an educational leader in the Australian Jewish community. He previously served as the Jewish Student Chaplain at the University of Leeds, headteacher of King Solomon High School in Barkingside, London, and was the principal of Mount Scopus Memorial College from 2007 until 2023.

== Early life and education ==
Kennard was born on June 24, 1964. He attended St Paul's School in London and pursued mathematics at New College, Oxford. During his time at Oxford in 1984, he participated in the British televised quiz-show University Challenge. Kennard received rabbinic ordination in Israel in 1989.

== Career ==
From 1990 to 1992, Kennard served as the Jewish student chaplain at the University of Leeds.

Between 1994 until 2004, he held multiple roles including founding head of Jewish Studies and head of Yavneh at the King David High School in Manchester, England. Additionally, from 1998 and 2004, he served as the headteacher of Broughton Jewish Cassel Fox Primary School in Manchester.

From September 2004 to December 2006, Kennard was the Headteacher of King Solomon High School, Barkingside, London. He then assumed the position of principal at Mount Scopus Memorial College in Melbourne, Australia, in January 2007, retiring from the role at the end of 2023.

Kennard has contributed articles to publications such as The Age, Jewish News, Australian Jewish News, and the London Jewish Chronicle, and has appeared on BBC radio and TV.

During his time in Australia, he was a member of the Rabbinical Council of Victoria and served on the executive, through he later resigned due to his dissatisfaction with rabbinic leadership.

=== Public efforts ===
Kennard is a frequent critic of the rabbinic institutions in Australia. He called for the resignations of the heads of the Yeshiva Centre and the rabbis connected to abuse in the religious community.

When the members of the Sydney Beth Din, including Moshe Gutnick and Yehoram Ulman, were found guilty of contempt of court, Kennard was the only high profile rabbinic figure to speak against them. He said, "I cannot remain silent when the rabbinate of Australia is prevented from fulfilling its primary task – to provide religious leadership to our community – by the refusal of its representatives to act with the highest standards of integrity, which should be the natural hallmark of any who bear the title ‘rabbi’."
