= Gutnick =

Gutnick is a surname. Notable people with the surname include:

- Chaim Gutnick (1921–2003), Australian rabbi
- Joseph Gutnick (born 1952), Australian businessman and mining industry entrepreneur
- Mordechai Gutnick, Australian rabbi
- Moshe Gutnick, Australian rabbi
