= Alex Ryvchin =

Australian author and lawyer (born 1983)

- Алекс Рывчин

Co-chief executive officer of the Executive Council of Australian Jewry
- Incumbent
- Assumed office February 2018 – present

Personal details
- Born: July 18, 1983 (age 43) Kiev, Ukrainian SSR, Soviet Union (now Kyiv, Ukraine)

Alexander Ryvchin (Russian: Александр Рывчин; born 18 July 1983) is a Ukrainian-born Australian author, advocate, media commentator, and lawyer. As co-chief executive officer of the Executive Council of Australian Jewry, he advocates on behalf of the Australian Jewish community. He is a frequent guest on US, Israeli and Australia media.

== Early life and education ==
He was born in Kiev, Ukrainian Soviet Socialist Republic (present-day Ukraine), in 1983 and his first language is Russian. His parents were both employed in the country as teachers, with his father teaching maths and physics and his mother teaching English. The family attempted to leave for years and were refuseniks. They were finally granted exit permits in 1987, spending 9 months in Ladispoli in Italy. At the age of 4, Ryvchin migrated to Australia as a refugee, arriving on 10 January 1988 with his parents, brother and maternal grandparents. When the family arrived in Australia they did not have a family or friend network in the country and were impoverished and did not speak English. They were met at the airport by the Australian Jewish Welfare Society. The family were embraced by Sydney's Jewish community and were offered advice and furniture for their home. The family was also selected by The Sydney Morning Herald for a story on Jewish refugees from the Soviet Union arriving in Australia. The family posed for photographs at Sydney Harbour and when a journalist called them a taxi home, they were unexpectedly reunited with a family friend from Ukraine. A photograph of Ryvchin's grandfather embracing the taxi driver appeared on the front page of the Sydney Morning Herald. In their early days in the country, his father worked as a taxi driver and cleaner at Emanuel Synagogue and his mother was employed at a pie shop. His grandfather, a mechanical engineer, became a volunteer bus driver for the Berger Centre and his doctor grandmother worked as a nanny. They lived in Sydney's Eastern suburbs for its Jewish community, living in areas such as Rose Bay, Bondi and Randwick. Ryvchin became an Australian citizen at the age of 7 and had his Bar Mitzvah at age 13. He attended primary school at Rose Bay Public School in Rose Bay and Woollahra Public School, before attending Sydney Boys High School. He graduated with a degree in law and politics from the University of New South Wales in Sydney.

== Career ==
He practised law at Mallesons Stephen Jaques in Sydney and Herbert Smith in London before serving as a spokesman for the Zionist Federation UK and being awarded an Israel Research Fellowship.

In May 2013, Ryvchin was appointed Director of Public Affairs at the Executive Council of Australian Jewry. In 2016, he spoke at the Babi Yar memorial in Sydney. In the same year, he wrote about the Babi Yar massacre for Australian Broadcasting Corporation. He was promoted to co-chief executive officer in 2018, becoming one of the youngest professional leaders in the Jewish world. In the same year he was invited to give a lecture "The Anti-Israel Movement in Australia: Perspectives on a Controversy" at Yale University for the Yale Program for the Study of Antisemitism.

As part of his position, he regularly represents Australian Jewry in the national and international media. In 2021, he appeared on SBS to mark 80 years since the murder of 33, 000 Jews at Babi Yar. He appears regularly on Sky News Australia. He has also appeared on news and current affairs programmes for the ABC.

In 2023, he was honoured by The Jerusalem Post and the Jewish National Fund as one of its top 25 young visionaries.

In November 2023, he cut ties with Australian Jewish Association and said the group "has no representative status and in no way speaks for or reflects the views of Australian Jews".

=== Writing ===
His writing on the Arab–Israeli conflict and Jewish history has been published in numerous international newspapers, including The Australian, The Sydney Morning Herald, The Guardian, the National Post, The Free Press and The Jerusalem Post. Ryvchin has also written on a number of occasions for The Spectator.

Ryvchin is the author of two books on Israel. His debut book, The Anti-Israel Agenda – Inside the Political War on the Jewish State (Gefen Publishing House, 2017), is a collaborative work with other pro-Israel writers including Alan Dershowitz, Colonel Richard Kemp, Hillel Neuer and Professor Alan Johnson. It was lauded by former Arkansas Governor Mike Huckabee as "the most important book on Israel since Alan Dershowitz's The Case for Israel".

In 2019, Ryvchin published his second book, Zionism – The Concise History.

He published the book The 7 Deadly Myths: Antisemitism from the Time of Christ to Kanye West in 2023.

Together with Sharri Markson, Ryvchin published in 2026 the book Bondi Terror about the Bondi Beach shooting on 14 December 2025.

== Views ==
Ryvchin has aligned himself with Zionism, describing it as a core part to Jewish identity and authoring works to reclaim its meaning to the movement. As co-CEO of the Executive Council of Australian Jewry (ECAJ), he leads the organisation's efforts to support Israel. Under him, ECAJ has included support for Zionism in its official statements and public activities, to public speeches rallying behind the State of Israel.

Ryvchin is a critic of the anti-Zionist movement referring to its activists as "self-righteous westerners" with "pretensions to heroism" who seek "redemption" by "slaying the Zionist beast".

He has been a staunch critic of Palestinian terrorism, corruption and rejection of a negotiated end to the conflict with Israel.

In 2018, he welcomed the decision of Scott Morrison's government to recognise West Jerusalem as Israel's capital.

He is against the Russo-Ukrainian War and supports Ukraine. In 2024, the Russian government added his name to a list of Australian nationals sanctioned for "formulating the anti-Russia agenda".

He has spoken publicly of his love for Australia and his support for multiculturalism and integration which Ryvchin argues requires that "we accept the duty to uphold the freedoms granted to us and to protect the values underpinning our society – values such as democracy, tolerance, mutual respect." He also participated in the 2024 Sydney Gay and Lesbian Mardi Gras with Dayenu, in solidarity with LGBT Jewry.

In June 2024 he called on Senator Fatima Payman to resign after Payman accused Israel of genocide during the Gaza war and used phrase "From the river to the sea Palestine will be free". He also said Payman and Australian Greens "must be held accountable" and accused them of bringing antisemitism into the mainstream and legitimising violent protests, "deceitful rhetoric on genocide", and endangering the Jewish community.

In the wake of the 2024 Melbourne synagogue attack, Ryvchin called for a "serious and profound" government response to increasing levels of antisemitism in Australia. He added that a "national crisis" should be declared on antisemitism and that there should be a ban on protests outside places of worship and schools.

== Personal life ==
He currently resides in Sydney with his wife and daughters. In 2025, Ryvchin was chosen to sit on the 150-person Voice of the People council.

In January 2025, his former home was vandalised and four cars were damaged in an antisemitic attack.

== Works ==
- 2017: Anti-Israel Agenda: Inside the Political War on the Jewish State ISBN 9652299146
- 2019: Zionism: the concise history ISBN 978-0-394-50736-1
- 2020: A New Day ISBN 9780646817149
- 2023: The Seven Deadly Myths ISBN 9798887191553
