= Jewish Community Council of Victoria =

Jewish community organisation

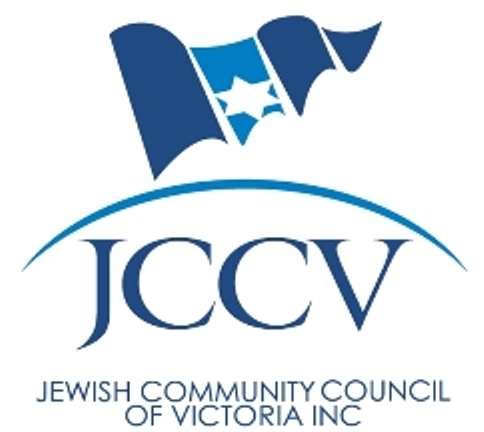
JCCV logo

The Jewish Community Council of Victoria (JCCV) is the main representative body for Victorian Jewry, representing 52 Jewish community organisations and over 60,000 Victorian Jews. The JCCV's mission is to represent the Victorian Jewish community, the largest Jewish community in Australia, and deal with matters that affect its status, welfare and interests.

The JCCV was established in 1938 as the Victorian Jewish Advisory Board. It has been known as the Jewish Community Council of Victoria since 1989 and became incorporated in 2000.

== The Australian context ==
Jewish people have lived in Australia from the beginning of European settlement but the Jewish population only grew significantly after World War II, largely due to migration from Europe. The 2006 Australian Census put the Jewish population of Melbourne (Victoria's capital) at 40,547, with a national Jewish population of 88,834. It is estimated, however, that there may well be under-counting of up to 30% for a range of reasons. One reputable analysis of the Census figures estimates that 60,080 Jews live in Victoria, constituting 1.2% of the total Victorian population. Other estimates, based on the numbers of the various Jewish funeral houses, put the number possibly as high as 100,000 during the early 2000s.

This community has a high concentration around the Melbourne suburbs of Caulfield, St Kilda East, and Elsternwick, and there are a large number of communal organisations situated in these suburbs, including schools, synagogues and cultural centres. There are also significant pockets of Jews in other areas of Melbourne including Malvern, Hawthorn East, Bentleigh, Brunswick, and Doncaster, although these locations do not have the same communal structure and are arguably not served as well by communal organisations..

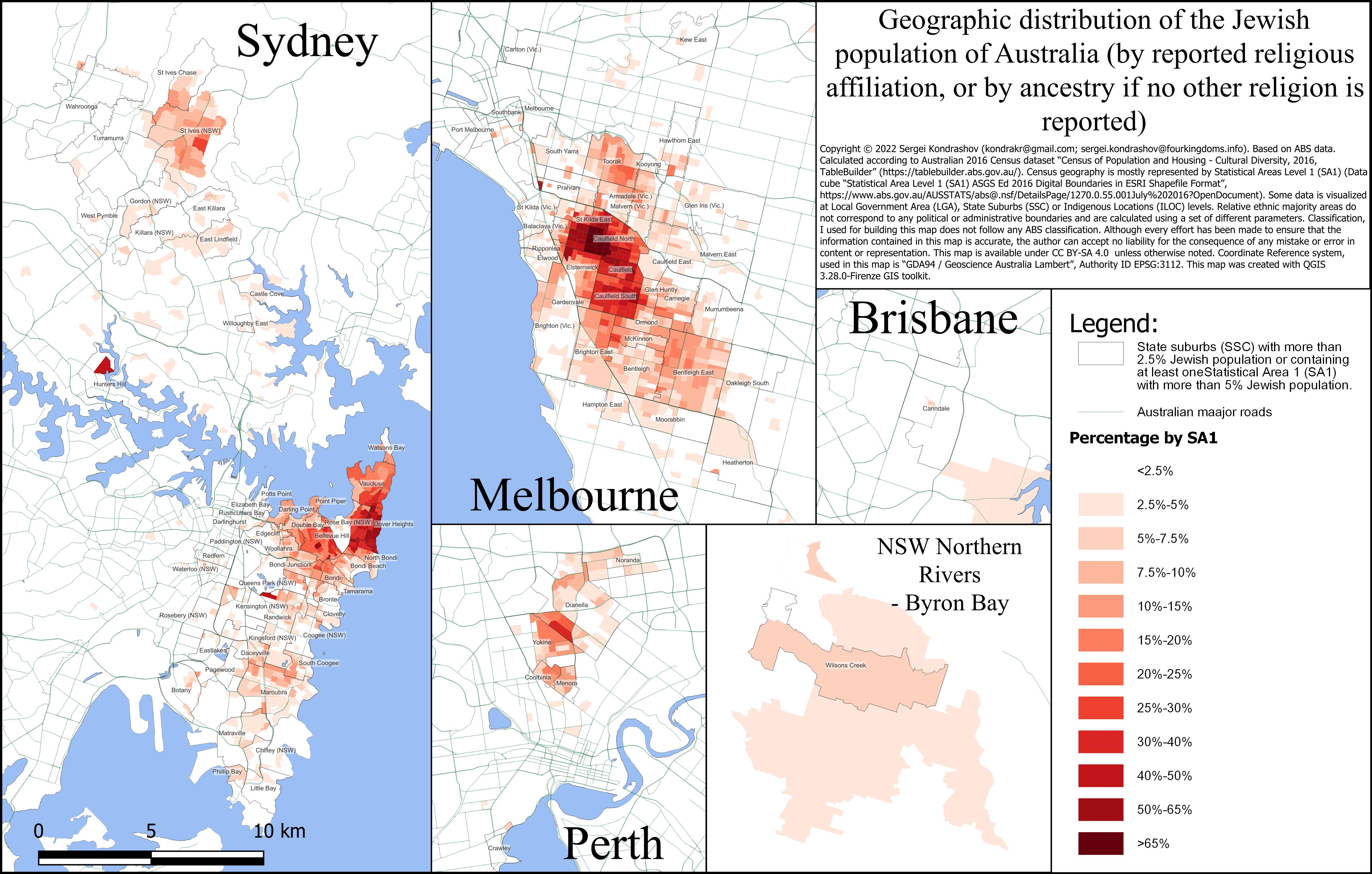
Geographic distribution of the Jewish population of Australia (by reported religious affiliation, or by ancestry if no other religion is reported), by Statistical Areas 1 (SA1)

The Victorian Jewish community comprises a range of sub-groups including strong Progressive, Yiddishist, Modern Orthodox, secular, Conservative, and ultra-Orthodox communities.

Victoria's Jewish population has continued to grow due to immigration from the former Soviet Union, South Africa, Israel, and New Zealand.

== History ==
The Jewish Community Council of Victoria was established 10 October 1989. It was the successor to a series of communal peak bodies that claimed to be the official voice of Victorian Jewry. The previous versions were the Melbourne Jewish Advisory Board (est. 1921), the Victorian Jewish Advisory Board (est. 1938) and the Victorian Jewish Board of Deputies (est. 1948).

There was a desire for a unified representative voice for the community since the 1880s, but it was a visit from Chief Rabbi Hertz in 1921 that was the trigger for the formation of the organization, where he convinced a number of prominent Melbourne Jews of its need. The membership of the resulting Melbourne Jewish Advisory Board (MJAB), was drawn from the three major synagogue congregations.

In 1936, the secular Judean League, the Yiddishist Kadimah and the Victorian Zionist Organisation pushed MJAB to form a new constitution which would allow input from the non-Orthodox communities. The MJAB renamed itself the Victorian Jewish Advisory Board (VJAB).

During World War II the representational base of the VJAB was further expanded to include 18 constituents by 1947. At a meeting on May 7, 1948, delegates to the VJAB agreed formally to rename and reconstitute themselves as the Victorian Jewish Board of Deputies (VJBD).

In 1988 delegates approved a name change and the VJBD became the Jewish Community Council of Victoria on 10 October 1989. The new name was promoted as having greater meaning for a cosmopolitan Jewry entering the 1990s. The JCCV became an incorporated entity in 2000.

The new organization continued to grow, and today the JCCV has over 50 affiliates.

== Affiliation ==
The JCCV's affiliation is drawn from various organisations that constitute the Victorian Jewish community. Their affiliates represent a range of religious, political, cultural, welfare, educational and social associations. Affiliates are able to share views through the JCCV's Plenum, which meets seven times per calendar year.

=== Affiliates as of December 2017 ===
- Access Inc
- ARK Centre
- Australasian Union of Jewish Students (Victoria)
- Australian Jewish Democratic Society Inc
- Australian Jewish Historical Society of Victoria Inc
- Australian Jewish Psychologists Inc
- Australian Society of Polish Jews & Their Descendants
- Ballarat Hebrew Congregation
- Bialik College
- Blake St Hebrew Congregation
- B'nai B'rith Victoria Inc
- Brighton Hebrew Congregation
- Caulfield Hebrew Congregation Inc
- Council of Orthodox Synagogues of Victoria Ltd
- East Melbourne Hebrew Congregation
- Elwood Talmud Torah Congregation
- Emmy Monash Aged Care Inc
- Forum of Russian Speaking Jewry
- J-Air
- Jewish Care (Vic) Inc
- Jewish Cultural Centre and National Library (Kadimah)
- Jewish Holocaust Museum & Research Centre
- Jewish Labor Bund Inc
- Jewish Museum of Australia
- Kehilat Nitzan Conservative (Masorti) Community Inc
- Kew Hebrew Congregation Inc
- King David School (The)
- Keshet Australia
- Kosher Meals on Wheels Association of Victoria Inc
- Leibler-Yavneh College
- Maccabi Victoria
- Magen David Adom Victoria Inc
- March of the Living Australia
- Melbourne Hebrew Congregation Inc
- Mizrachi Organisation
- Mount Scopus Memorial College
- National Council of Jewish Women of Australia (Vic)
- North Eastern Jewish War Memorial Centre Inc (Yeshurun Synagogue)
- Oz Shalom TV Inc
- Progressive Judaism Victoria
- Shalom Association Inc
- Sholem Aleichem College
- South Caulfield Hebrew Congregation
- Stand Up
- St Kilda Hebrew Congregation
- Theodor Herzl Social Club Inc
- United Jewish Education Board Inc
- Victorian Association of Jewish Ex & Servicemen & Women Australia Inc
- Wings of Care (Kanfei Chessed) Inc
- Zionism Victoria
- Zionist Youth Council

== Activities ==
=== Advocacy ===
The JCCV devotes much of its resources to advocating for the Jewish community with government and the media. The JCCV regularly provides submissions to government on a wide range of issues on behalf of Victorian Jewry. In the past these have included reforms into the Sentencing Act, Racial Vilification legislation, Child Protection and Equal Opportunity legislation.

The JCCV also coordinates with local governments where there is a significant Jewish population. One such issue is setting traffic lights in the city of Glen Eira to automatic during Shabbat.

They are involved in interfaith and multicultural activities and dialogue. This includes establishing bilateral ties and hosting functions with other faiths and communities, and by participating in various multicultural and multi-faith organisations, both government and non-government organisations.

The JCCV has engaged in overt advocacy of Israeli policies in partnership with Zionism Victoria. This is despite having affiliates such as the Australian Jewish Democratic Society who are not supportive of Israel's policies.

The JCCV has, however, come in for considerable criticism for a number of public relations failures. Arguably the greatest of these was the JCCV's inability to accommodate the community's LGBTQI community until 2015, although they did apologise for the exclusion in 2019.

The JCCV has also been heavily criticised for its failure to tackle key communal issues, such as drug and alcohol abuse, the rise of the far right, soaring costs of Jewish living, and the refusal to engage in meaningful public advocacy to extradite accused paedophile, former [Addas] Principal, Malka Leifer.

=== Public ceremonies and events ===
The JCCV also organises a number of communal events, and is the host of a communal event for Yom HaShoah and Yom HaAtzma'ut, the later being co-hosted with Zionism Victoria.

Some events in the past have caused problems for them. The JCCV did significantly strain their relations with the Islamic Council of Victoria (ICV) due to its invitation of anti-Islam academic Daniel Pipes to address the community. Pipes is noted by the Southern Poverty Law Center as an "anti-Muslim extremist" and his presence caused the ICV to cancel their official partnership in the annual Jewish Muslim Comedy Debate, and they temporarily broke off all contact with the JCCV.

=== General activities ===
The JCCV have other functions within the community such as:

- Social justice and community welfare projects such as the Youth Alcohol Project, Child Protection Working Group, Pastoral Care Project and the GLBTI (Gay, Lesbian, Bisexual, Transgender, Intersex) Reference Group
- Various guest speakers and forums on a range of topics
- Acting as an umbrella organisation to pool resources and lessen the duplication of activities
- Acting as a central node for promotion of communal events and news
- Liaising with police on incidents of anti-Semitism and other forms of racism, and assisting with community security, and emergency crisis management

== See also ==
- Executive Council of Australian Jewry, the national umbrella body of which JCCV is a constituent part
- Jewish Community Council
- History of the Jews in Australia
