= Meir Shlomo Kluwgant =

Chabad communal rabbi in Melbourne

Meir Shlomo Kluwgant (Hebrew: מאיר שלמה קלווגנט; born 1968) is an ultra-Orthodox Chabad communal rabbi in Melbourne, Australia. He has held numerous posts including at Jewish Care, chaplain at Victoria Police, and has at various times held the presidency of both the Rabbinical Council of Victoria (RCV) and the Organisation of Rabbis of Australia (ORA).

He is the cousin of Yaakov Glasman, who has also been president of the RCV and the Rabbinic Council of Australia and New Zealand.

== Early rabbinic career ==
Kluwgant began his career as a shochet (ritual slaughterer). He also held a number of senior positions at Jewish Care Victoria over 26 years, culminating in his role as General Manager of Cultural & Spiritual services.

He also held a number of smaller roles in the community such as the chair of the Victorian mohelim committee.

== Communal rabbinic roles ==
Kluwgant is a past president of the RCV. During his time in the role Kluwgant enacted a number of reforms to the structure of the organization including updating the rules to comply with Victorian law, and a framework for professional development for the members. There were also moves to establish the signing of a pre-nuptial agreement for all marrying couples, even though the agreement is unlikely to be of much use under Australian law.

It was while in this role that Kluwgant restructured the Melbourne Beth Din following the forced resignation of Sholem Gutnick, due to a number of scandals.

Following his time at the RCV, Kluwgant took over the role of the head of ORA, During his time he was active in advocacy and meeting with politicians and other significant members of the community, culminating in a meeting with Prime Minister Tony Abbott. He resigned from the ORA due to his involvement in the Royal Commission into Institutional Responses to Child Sexual Abuse, it was rebranded as the New ORA (NORA) in order to distance the organisation from the scandals of its predecessor.

He was also active as a chaplain for the police force for many years, and sat on the Victoria Police Multi-Faith Advisory Committee.

== Role in communal sex abuse scandal ==
Kluwgant over the years has repeated the requirement for abuse victims to report any abuse to the police.

However, his response to the abuse was challenged when it was claimed that Kluwgant threatened a victim of abuse that he should not have gone to authorities and that he had "no right" to get involved.

Following his testimony at the Royal Commission into Institutional Responses to Child Sexual Abuse in 2015, Kluwgant sent a highly inflammatory text message about Zephaniah Waks, a father of a victim, to the editor of the Australian Jewish News (AJN), which was subsequently published. The text read:

Zephaniah Waks is killing us. Zephaniah is attacking Chabad. He is a lunatic on the fringe, guilty of neglecting his own children. Where was he when all this happened?

The AJN journalist who published the text was fired, but following significant pressure Kluwgant was forced to resign from all communal roles. The resignation was more significant because two other rabbis from that community were forced to resign as a result of the Royal Commission at the same time, Yossef Feldman and Avrohom Glick, Kluwgant's uncle.

Kluwgant was later appointed as principal of the Adass Israel school, following that school's own sex abuse scandal involving their former principal, Malka Leifer. Following an outcry in both the Adass and wider Jewish communities, the offer of the position was withdrawn.

== Other controversies ==
In 2010, Kluwgant led a delegation of rabbis to meet with Australian Attorney General, Robert McClelland to discuss counterterrorism. The JCCV, the peak Jewish body in Victoria criticised the move, because they claimed that the rabbis had over reached, and it was not their role to be involved in these discussions.

In 2013, he wrote a letter attempting to establish the Chabad rabbi in Canberra as "the rabbi of Canberra", even though the established community had their own rabbi at the time.

In 2014, he welcomed the former Chief Rabbi of Israel, Shlomo Amar to Australia. The intention was to establish a list (or registry) for the verification of Jewish status, and that all Orthodox marriages in Australia should be controlled centrally by the Sydney Beth Din and the Melbourne Beth Din.

In 2017, Kluwgant sued Phillip Weinberg, a spokesman for victims, for allegedly vilifying him to the Adass secretary, alleging that this caused him to lose the position.

== See also ==
- Royal Commission into Institutional Responses to Child Sexual Abuse
- Yeshiva Centre
- Sexual abuse incidents at Adass Israel School, Melbourne
- Rabbinical Council of Victoria
- Melbourne Beth Din
