= Jewish Care (Australia) =

Australian organisation

Jewish Care is a philanthropic organisation that was originally founded to serve the Jewish population of Victoria, Australia. Today, Jewish Care run several aged care facilities and help peoples in poverty, disability services and rehabilitation and respite. It is located in Melbourne, Australia.

== History ==
The organisation was founded in 1948 as the Melbourne Jewish Philanthropic Society. Another organisation with the same name was established as early as 1892. In 1936, the organisation changed its name to the Australian Jewish Welfare Society.

In 2001, the organisation became Jewish Care after merging with Montefiore Homes, the largest Jewish aged care facility in Victoria.

== Activities ==
Jewish Care has several aged care facilities in addition to Montefiore Homes. These include Gary Smorgon House, and Munzer House. Jewish care also has respite centres and home care services.

Jewish Care also offers as interest free loans for Jewish entrepreneurs and their start ups, and partnerships with other communal organisations.

Jewish Care is listed by the JCCV's emergency response organisation, Jewish Emergency Management Provider (JEMP) as a part of the communal support network. Jewish Care was are slated to engage in over $180 million worth of building works, including $85 million for one building in St Kilda Rd.

== Controversy ==
In 2012, the families of some residents at Munzer House accused Jewish Care of substandard care at the facility. The families claimed that the situation was caused by staff and budget cuts. Examples of substandard care included rationing of sanitary pads, failure to look after the religious needs of the residents, and forcing residents to wait to go to the toilet for up to an hour.

The claims of neglect and elder abuse soon extended to other care facilities run by Jewish Care, including banning family members and serious neglect of the elderly residents. Some of the families contacted the Victorian Equal Opportunity and Human Rights Commission regarding the care at the facilities.

In 2013, Jewish Care began an inquiry that dealt with extensive child sexual abuse that happened at a children's home between 1939 and 1992, when it closed.

In 2015, the General Manager of Cultural & Spiritual Services, Meir Shlomo Kluwgant, was forced to resign following an abusive text message that he sent calling the father of a victim of sexual abuse a "lunatic".

In 2016, Jewish Care opened a confidential phone line to assist the Yeshivah Centre, Melbourne in their redress scheme for the victims of sexual abuse by the centre. The name of at least one of the victims was leaked by a board member of Jewish Care to the board of the Yeshiva Centre. This act allegedly led to the bullying and intimidation of the victim.
