= Marc Middleton =

American journalist

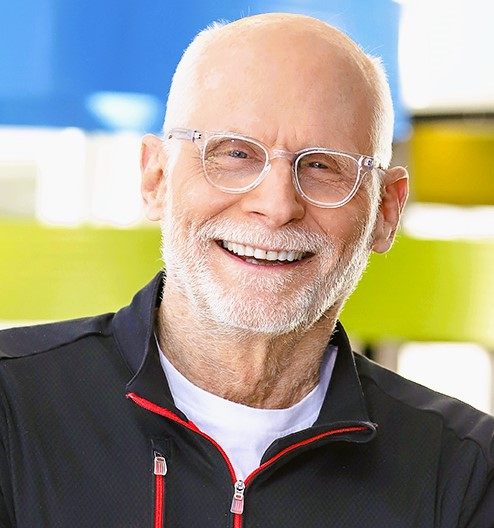
- Marc Middleton in 2022.
- Born: Marc Davis Middleton; October 19, 1951 (age 74)
- Education: Florida State University
- Occupations: Television journalist; media entrepreneur; author; publisher; filmmaker
- Known for: founder and CEO of social networking company "Growing Bolder"

Marc Davis Middleton (born October 19, 1951) is an American television journalist, media entrepreneur, author, publisher, and filmmaker who focuses on the changing culture of aging. He is the Founder and CEO of Growing Bolder, a company that produces and distributes health, well-being, and active lifestyle content creation for the 50+ demographic.

Middleton is a multiple Emmy Award-winning broadcaster, host of the national Growing Bolder TV program, executive producer of the Surviving & Thriving TV program, editor and publisher of Growing Bolder Magazine, and writer, producer, and director of the Emmy-nominated documentary film Conquering Kilimanjaro.

Middleton is the author of Growing Bolder, Defy the Cult of Youth, Live with Passion and Purpose, and Rock Stars of Aging, 50 Ways to Live to 100.

== Education ==
Middleton attended Indian Hill High School in Cincinnati, Ohio and Florida State University in Tallahassee, Florida, where he earned a bachelor's degree in Biology. He was captain of the Varsity swimming team and a member of the varsity track team while at Florida State.

== Career ==
Middleton is a multiple Emmy Award-winning broadcaster, host of the national Growing Bolder TV program, executive producer of the Surviving & Thriving TV program, editor and publisher of Growing Bolder Magazine, and writer, producer, and director of the Emmy-nominated documentary film, Conquering Kilimanjaro. He's been honored with two Southeast Regional Emmy Awards and is a 4-time Emmy Nominee. Middleton was part of a WESH News team that won the prestigious Alfred I. DuPont Award for their coverage of the Columbia shuttle disaster.

Middleton hosts the Growing Bolder TV Show on PBS stations nationwide and is a blogger for Huffington Post. He is a masters swimmer and set a world record in 2010 in the 200-meter freestyle relay with teammates Rowdy Gaines, Scot Weis, and Keith Switzer.

Middleton and The Growing Bolder Media Group have been named winners of the 2008 Senior Vision Media Award, presented annually by the Florida Council on Aging, to the organization that does the most to give a positive image of aging.

== Media career ==
In 1979, Middleton became acquainted with Mike Leonard, a sports anchor at KOOL-TV in Phoenix, Arizona. With Leonard's help, Middleton produced an on-air audition tape and was hired by WJCL-TV in Savannah, Georgia. Six months later, Leonard was hired by the Today Show opening up an on-air position at KOOL-TV. Middleton was hired and returned to Phoenix as a weekend sports anchor.

In 1981, Middleton resigned to become Vice President of Broadcasting and play-by-play announcer for the Phoenix Inferno, a Major Indoor Soccer League team.

In 1985, Middleton returned to Savannah, Georgia, as the Sports Director for WTOC-TV.

In 1988, Middleton was hired by WESH-TV in Orlando, Florida as a weekend sports anchor. Two months later, Middleton was named sports director and weekday anchor. Middleton won two Emmy Awards and received multiple Emmy nominations for sports reporting while working with WESH.

In 2001, Middleton moved from the sports desk to anchor the early morning and noon newscasts at WESH. He was part of the team awarded the Alfred. I. DuPont Award in 2004 for coverage of the Space Shuttle Columbia Disaster.

Middleton covered the 1992 Summer Olympics for NBC News Channel and the 2000 Summer Olympics and 2004 Summer Olympics for Hearst Television.

In 2006, Middleton resigned from WESH-TV to launch Growing Bolder. In 2011, Middleton became a featured contributor to HuffPost.

In 2009, Growing Bolder TV debuted on WMFE-TV, the local PBS affiliate in Orlando, Florida.

In 2010, Growing Bolder was distributed by American Public Television and aired nationally on public broadcasting stations.

In 2012, Middleton wrote the Amazon best-selling e-book Rock Stars of Aging, 50 Ways to Live to 100.

Also in 2012, Middleton executive produced and contributed on-air reporting to Surviving & Thriving, a television program about overcoming major life challenges that launched in 2012 on WKMG-TV in Orlando, winning Emmy nominations in its first four seasons. In 2014, Middleton successfully summited Mt. Kilimanjaro in Tanzania, Africa with a group of cancer survivors and cancer community advocates. Middleton carried a video camera, shooting the documentary film Conquering Kilimanjaro. The film aired nationally on the RLTV cable network, received a 2015 Emmy® Nomination and helped raise funds for LiveStrong Foundation.

In 2014, Growing Bolder debuts on commercial television on the national cable network, RLTV.

In 2015, WKMG-TV in Orlando became the flagship station for Surviving and Thriving.

In 2016, Middleton won the 2016 Changing the Way the World Ages Award from Home Care Assistance.

In 2016, WESH-TV becomes the flagship station for both Surviving and Thriving and Growing Bolder. Middleton received his 5th Emmy nomination in 2016 for the news feature, The Comeback Queen.

In 2018, Growing Bolder returned to public broadcasting stations and was also picked up by Create TV Network, expanding its carriage to 385 stations in 166 markets. Middleton won the 2018 American Public Television PitchFest competition and the $75,000 first place prize for a new pledge program concept called Launch Pad to What’s Next. The 90-minute special debuted in late 2018 and was distributed by American Public Television.

== Books ==
- Growing Bolder: Defy the Cult of Youth, Live with Passion and Purpose (1st ed.)
- Rock Stars of Aging (2012)

== Films ==
- Conquering Kilimanjaro

== Athletics ==
After a 37-year layoff, Middleton began swimming again in 2010. He is now a six-time world-record holder, 7-time national champion, and a Pan American record holder in masters competition. In 2012, after a 39-year layoff, Middleton competed in his first track finishing third in the 60-meter hurdles at USA Masters National Track and Field Championships in Bloomington, Indiana.

== Art ==
A self-taught artist, Middleton creates abstract paintings in his spare time and has lectured at the Atlantic Center for the Arts in New Smyrna Beach, Florida as keynote speaker at a national quilting conference.
