= Kosher Australia =

Australian kosher certification Agency

Hechsher of Kosher Australia
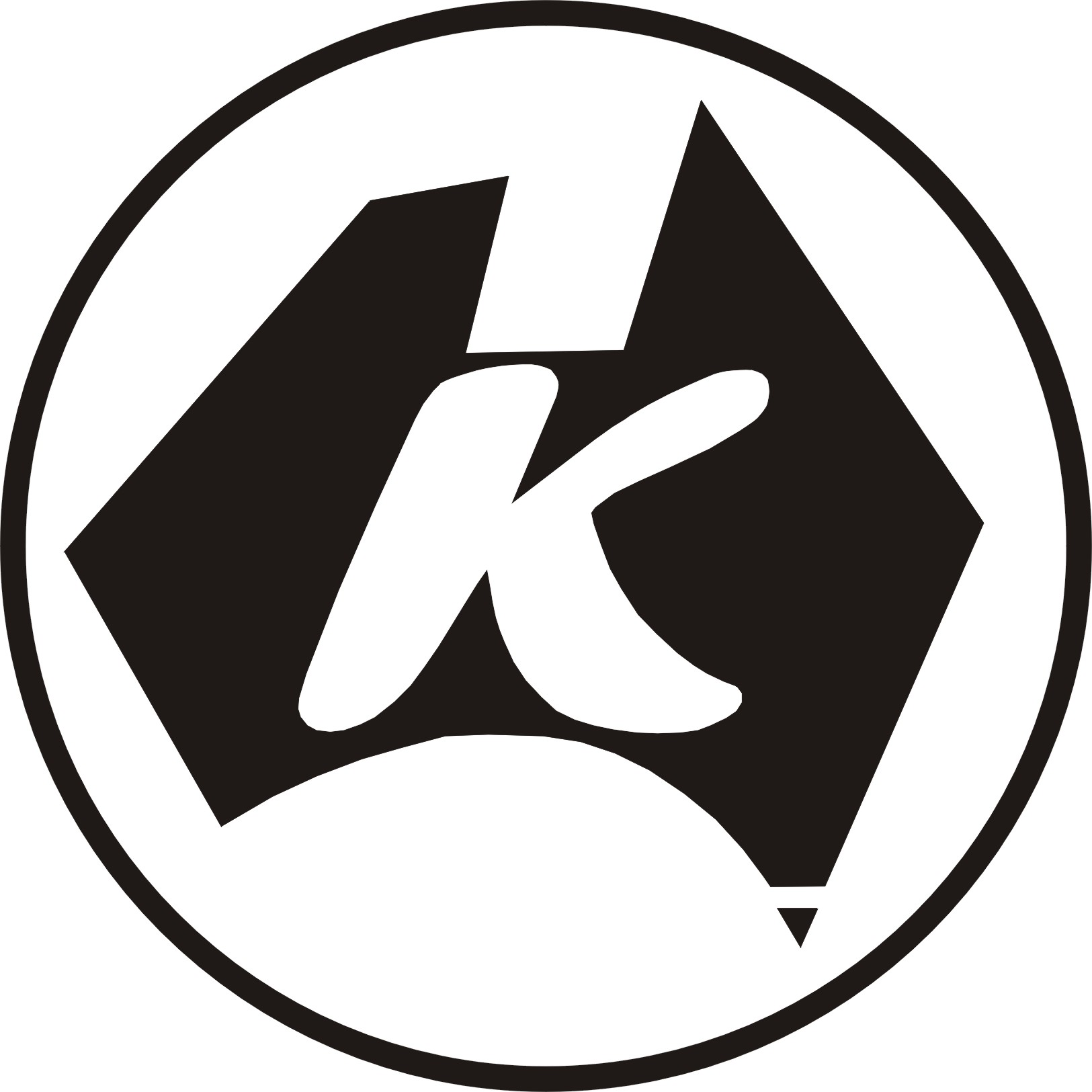
- Certifying agency: Kosher Australia
- Founded: 1968
- Headquarters: 81 Balaclava Rd, Caulfield North VIC 3161, Australia
- Key People: ● Rabbi Mordechai Gutnick (Rabbinic Administrator); ● Rabbi Menachem Sabbach (Rabbinic Co-Ordinator); ● Mr Yankel Wajsbort (General Manager)
- Website: kosher.org.au

Kosher Australia is the largest Australian based kosher certification agency. As of 2018 they had certified over 500 companies both in Australia and abroad. It was initially called Mizrachi Kashrut, followed by Melbourne Kashrut before becoming Kosher Australia in 2004.

== History ==
Kosher Australia began in 1968 when Rabbi Baruch Abaranok, the then rabbi of the Mizrachi organisation in Melbourne, started providing supervision to local community caterers. A team of volunteer community members investigated companies for kosher compliance and by 1976, annual kosher guides were made available to the kosher community. Over the years it has expanded to employ a number of staff and is recognised internationally by other kosher authorities. The rabbi responsible for the organisation's policies is Mordechai Gutnick, who also sits on the Melbourne Beth Din.

== Controversies ==
Kosher food in Australia has come under attack as a part of the alt-right's attack on halal food, led by MP Pauline Hanson. It has been part of investigations in Parliament, although there have been no ramifications for the kosher industry yet. There have also been a number of attacks on kosher slaughter, and the community has stood up to defend itself.
