= Sydney Beth Din =

Jewish religious institution

- סידני בת דין

Religion
- Affiliation: Judaism

Website
- https://www.bethdin.org.au/contact

The Sydney Beth Din (Hebrew: סידני בת דין), occasionally abbreviated to SBD, is a Jewish religious institution headquartered in Sydney, Australia. As part of its functions as a beth din, it processes divorces, conversions to Judaism, answers questions about personal and ritual statuses, and hears disputes between private individuals.

== History ==
The beth din was reconstituted in 1905. Prior to that, several attempts had been made to have a beth din established in the city of Sydney; a beth din had already been established in Melbourne in the mid 1860s. Originally, the beth din operated primarily under the authority of the British Chief Rabbi, including appointments of dayanim, but the beth din had control over its appointments by the 1940s.

From 1940 to 1975, Israel Porush served as the head of the court; during his administration, the court maintained religious orthodoxy (albeit with a few compromises); and oversaw the expansion of the court's congregation. In 1956, a war memorial was opened.

== 21st Century ==
=== Contempt of court ===
In 2017, four rabbis from the Beth Din were found to be in contempt of court for threatening sanctions on Reuven Barukh if he took his case to the secular courts and did not first attend the Beth Din. The four rabbis were Yehoram Ulman, Moshe Gutnick, Michael Chriqi, and Ulman's son-in-law Eli Schlanger. The letter, sent on behalf of all the individuals on the Beth Din stated that "all members of the Jewish faith are obliged to have their disputes heard in accordance with Jewish Law at a Beth Din" and that Jews are "not permitted to seek adjudication at a civil court without the express permission of a Beth Din". The judge in his ruling stated that their behaviour "displays either arrogant disregard of their own procedures and rules of natural justice, substantial ineptitude, or inexperience dealing with commercial disputes".

The rabbis involved appealed the case, and although the fines were reduced to $25,000 from $50,000, they were still expected to pay costs for the case which were expected to be $350,000. The fine was later reduced to $10,000 for Ulman, and the others also had their fines reduced.

In the aftermath of this ruling the Rabbinical Council of Australia and New Zealand (RCANZ) committed to an internal review, although a statement from the Rabbinical Council of NSW rejected the judgment calling the ruling a "serious violation of religious freedom, a principle that Australia holds dear". RCANZ later changed their stance and rejected the calls for the rabbis of the Beth Din to stand down.

The Sydney Beth Din of which Ulman is a senior member, released a statement stating that Jews must go to a Beth Din to settle matters with other Jews and they should not go to secular courts. In their statement they said that this is a fundamental core religious principle, and that removing the power of the Beth Din to force Jews to come before them "sets a precedent that affects... our ability, as Jews, to freely practice our religion".

==== 2019 Jewish Board of Deputies investigation ====
In March 2019 the NSW Jewish Board of Deputies (JBOD) intended to investigate the Beth Din which Ulman is a part owner and senior member. The resolution which was passed unopposed was to look into all aspects of the Beth Din in connection to this case. JBOD said that the Beth Din had a "history of effectively undermining the theological basis of Orthodoxy and halachah," and that there were serious "defects in the ownership structure, governance, mechanisms of accountability and dispute-resolution processes" and that they were a law unto themselves. The Beth Din responded that JBOD had a "this attempt by the BOD to assert authority over the SBD creates an insurmountable conflict of interest for the BOD, a body with a history of effectively undermining the theological basis of Orthodoxy and halachah". They rejected the concept that JBOD "has any right to be involved in, to interfere with or comment on the affairs of an Orthodox rabbinical body".

In 2019, the beth din was investigated by the NSW Jewish Board of Deputies for "defects in the ownership structure, governance, measures of accountability and dispute resolution processes". The beth din responded to the investigation by claiming that JBOD had a history of undermining Halakha.

In 2021, the final report by JBOD was released, which called for the beth din to be reformed.

=== COVID-19 pandemic ===
Due to the coronavirus pandemic in Australia, the beth din had to suspend synagogue services in Sydney. However, they were later restored.

=== Accomplishments in the 2020s ===
The beth din was instrumental in granting a divorce to the last known Jewish person in Afghanistan, Zevulun Simantov. They also granted the first ordination to a woman rabbi in Sydney.

== Rabbis ==
Current structure

- Yehoram Ulman - senior dayan
- Moshe Gutnick - senior dayan
- Michael Chriqui - associate dayan
- Ze'ev Litke - associate dayan

Previous rabbis and administration: Two Rabbis from the Beth Din's administration team were killed by local ISIS gunmen on 14 December 2025.

- Rabbi Eli Schlanger, 41 age, Yehoram Ulman's son-in-law, one of the Rabbis found guilty of contempt of court (see above).
- Yaakov Levitan, age 39, a South African–born rabbi who was secretary of the Beth Din.
