= Australian Jewish Association =

- Abbreviation: AJA
- Formation: 2017
- Type: Jewish advocacy organisation
- Purpose: Advocacy and representation for Jewish Australians; Advocacy of Israel and Zionism; Advocacy against pro-Palestinian activism
- Headquarters: Australia
- President: Robert Gregory
- Subsidiaries: Australian Jewish Association Tzedakah (AJAT)

The Australian Jewish Association (AJA) is an Australian Jewish advocacy organisation representing conservative Jewish values. Founded in 2017, the AJA engages in public advocacy and media commentary on issues relating to Jewish affairs, Israel, and Australian politics. Peak body the Executive Council of Australian Jewry has characterised the AJA as being unrepresentative of mainstream Australian Jews.

== Structure and governance ==
As a private Jewish advocacy group, AJA's leadership is self-appointed with a number of undisclosed paid members.

The founding president of AJA is David Adler. Robert Gregory is chief executive officer and president, and was AJA’s public affairs director for two years.

== History and activities ==
Founded in 2017, the Australian Jewish Association (AJA) has gained prominence through strategic social media engagement and presence in mainstream media outlets such as The Australian, Sky News Australia, Australian Financial Review, Herald Sun, The Daily Telegraph, and The Jerusalem Post, as well as outlets aimed at the Jewish community such as The Australian Jewish News.

AJA makes submissions to the Australian Government on public policy matters affecting Jewish Australians.

=== Views and political positions ===
According to its mission statements, the AJA describes itself as being guided by Torah principles and aligned with conservative values. AJA states that it seeks to be a membership-based representative organisation for Jewish Australians and that its public policy positions are informed by traditional Halachic principles, while welcoming members of varying levels of religious observance who support Israel.

AJA states that it operates within Australia’s liberal democratic framework and provides advocacy and representation to government, media, and other institutions. The organisation says it is not affiliated with any political party but engages with politicians across the political spectrum on issues it considers relevant to Jewish life in Australia and Australia–Israel relations.

=== AJAT ===
The Australian Jewish Association Tzedakah (AJAT) is AJA's registered charity arm. AJAT is listed in the category under "Harm Prevention" with a primary role in combating antisemitism. AJAT subscribes to the International Holocaust Remembrance Alliance (IHRA) definition of antisemitism and conducts activities to implement its adoption in Australian jurisdictions and institutions.

== Media statements ==
AJA is regularly quoted on issues of politics and antisemitism within Australia.

In September 2024, CEO Robert Gregory stated that AJA was shocked at the level of support for Hezbollah on the streets of Sydney and Melbourne during a series of protests after the death of its leader Hassan Nasrallah. In November 2024, AJA president David Adler stated on Sky News Australia that there was a "crisis of antisemitism" in Australia after AJA received death threats.

Following the 2024 Melbourne synagogue attack in December 2024, AJA stated that Jewish Australians felt "outraged", but not surprised, due to their view that Australian Jews had been abandoned by the Albanese government. Commenting on a vandalism incident in Sydney in January 2025, AJA blamed the Australian Labor government for the increase in hate, vandalism and violence against Jewish Australians.

== Criticism ==
Jewish Israeli-Australian Na’ama Carlin has accused the AJA of spreading unverified or misleading claims that portrayed pro-Palestinian protests as antisemitic. In October 2023, AJA released a video on X of a protest following the October 7 attacks, claiming that a "Muslim mob of 100s chant[ed] 'gas the Jews'", leading to international condemnation of the protest. However, a police investigation found no evidence of the phrase being used in the video, instead deeming it a misinterpretation of "where's the Jews". Police said they obtained statements from several individuals who attended the protest and reported hearing the phrase. Crikey alleged that the video itself was deliberately edited, with the audio in the video being pasted over footage of protesters chanting "Palestine is occupied".

In a debate over Jewish representation, the Executive Council of Australian Jewry in May 2024 criticised AJA as being unrepresentative of the mainstream of Australian Jews, and urged media organisations to be aware of who they are before engaging with them. The Australia Israel Jewish Affairs Council (AIJAC) voiced similar opinions stating that AJA is "extremist" and "fringe", and "utterly incompatible with Jewish values". The Jewish Council of Australia called AJA a "far-right extremist organisation", highlighting AJA's association with far-right figures like Pauline Hanson, Lauren Southern, and Moshe Feiglin, as well as AJA's stance that the Safe Schools programme is "child abuse for a Marxist social engineering agenda".

The Lebanese Muslim Association has criticised some of AJA's X posts, such as a May 2024 post referring to pro-Palestine encampments on university campuses as "Nazi encampments".
