= Moshe Hecht =

- Born: 1985; Queens, New York
- Origin: Brooklyn, New York
- Genres: Jewish music Folk rock Reggae rock
- Occupation(s): Singer-songwriter, tech entrepreneur
- Years active: 2008–present
- Labels: Aderet
- Website: moshehecht.com

Moshe Hecht (born 1985 in Queens, New York) is an American Hasidic singer-songwriter and rabbi, best known as the eponymous lead singer of the folk rock group Moshe Hecht Band.

== Biography ==
=== Early life ===
Hecht was born in Queens, New York in 1985 to a Hasidic Jewish family, one among 14 children. He is the grandson of prominent Chabad rabbi Chaim Gutnick. He displayed interest in music at an early age, singing in school choirs and even writing a musical for Hanukkah when he was 18. He also began listening to secular musicians like Bob Marley, Simon & Garfunkel, and Bob Dylan, but was often forced to hide their records from his devout friends and family.

After high school, Hecht spent a year in Ukraine doing community service, then 18 months in Melbourne completing his rabbinic ordination.

=== Musical career ===
Hecht gained a strong community following in 2008 with the release of his song "Lamplighters", a tribute to the Chabad emissaries killed in the 2008 Mumbai attacks. Building a community following from this and other singles, he formed the Moshe Hecht Band in 2010 with a group of local musicians. The band's debut album, Heart is Alive, was released by Aderet Music on October 18, 2011.

== Discography ==
- Heart is Alive (2011)
