= Ark Centre =

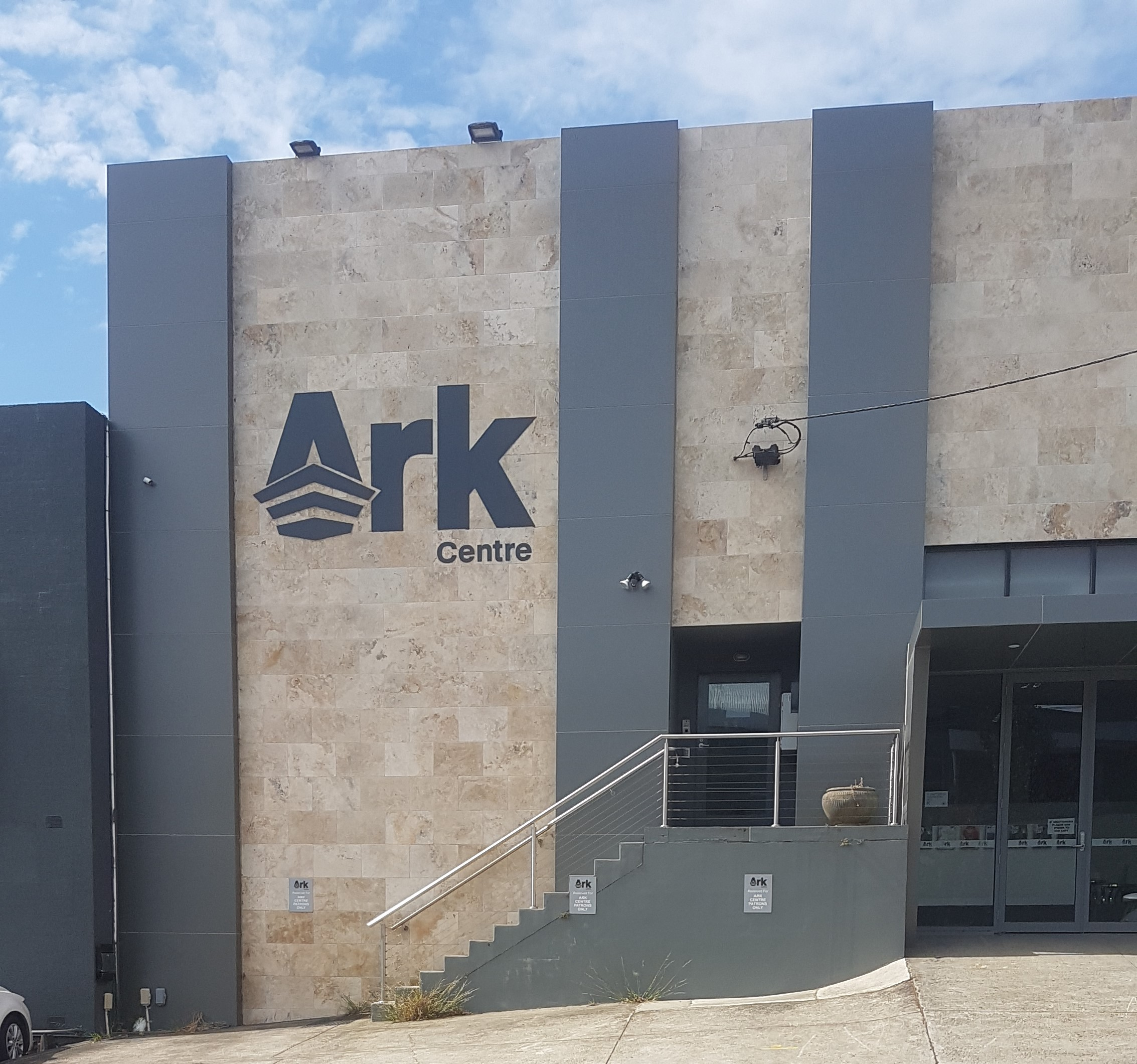
- Exterior of Ark Centre

- Location in Melbourne

Religion
- Affiliation: Modern Orthodox Judaism
- Ecclesiastical or organizational status: Synagogue
- Leadership: Rabbi Gabi Kaltmann
- Status: Active

Location
- Location: Cato Street, Hawthorn East, Melbourne, Victoria
- Country: Australia
- Interactive map of Ark Centre
- Coordinates: 37°50′35″S 145°02′34″E

Architecture
- Type: Synagogue architecture
- Style: Modernist
- Established: 2008 (as a congregation)
- Completed: 2014

The Ark Centre is a Modern Orthodox Jewish congregation, synagogue, and community centre located in Hawthorn East, a suburb of Melbourne, in Victoria, Australia. It was founded by a number of people who were previously members of Kew Hebrew Congregation.

== Overview ==
The Ark Centre opened in 2008 operating from a hall in Bialik College, under the leadership of Yoram Symons and later Rabbi Yaron Gottlieb who had the role as the synagogue's Magid. Under the stewardship of Symons and then Rabbi Shneur Reti-Waks, they operated out of a hired home in Lovell St, East Hawthorn, before moving into their permanent residence in Cato Street in 2014.

Since moving into the Cato Street premises the suite of offerings provided has grown. Beyond the ‘traditional’ services of life-cycle events, events associated with religious festivals and holidays and synagogue services, Ark Centre has invested in providing more to the community. The physical premises were designed to be multi-purpose to facilitate usage in a number of ways: celebration of life cycle events, synagogue services, youth programs, yoga and wellbeing activities, conferences, adult and youth programs and much more.

Within the premises is a commercial kitchen where kosher catering is available. There are also other services provided by the centre.

Under the stewardship of Reti-Waks, the Ark also courted controversy when there were a number of marriages where there were rumours that they did not conform to halachic standards. The matter was resolved between the Rabbinical Council of Victoria and Reti-Waks, and the marriages were all accepted.

Reti-Waks on behalf of the Ark has signed letters in support of marriage equality, and against the Australian government's treatment of refugees.

In 2019 Rabbi Gabi Kaltmann and Rebbetzin Mushka Kantor Kaltmann assumed the role of Rabbi and Rebbetzin of Ark Centre.

=== Conversions ===
The Ark Centre was one of a number of conversion programs in Victoria, existing as an alternative to the existing Melbourne Beth Din program. The program was run under the auspices of Rabbi Yisrael Rosen, but these conversions were not officially accepted by the Chief Rabbinate of Israel and did not appear on their list of recognised conversion courts.

In trying to deal with this situation, Reti-Waks joined the Rabbinical Council of Victoria, and later the Ark agreed to suspend any conversions for 12 months while the Beth Din determined their legitimacy. Ultimately the conversions were rejected by the Beth Din, even though they did not provide any proof of illegitimacy on the part of the Ark.

== Spiritual leadership ==
- Yoram Symons, 2008-2009, 2010-2012
- Rabbi Yaron Gottlieb, 2008-2009
- Rabbi Steven Link, 2009-2010
- Rabbi Shneur Reti-Waks, 2009-2019
- Rabbi Gabi Kaltmann, 2018–present

== See also ==
- List of synagogues in Australia
- History of the Jews in Australia
