= King Solomon High School =

Coordinates: 51.5936°N 0.0875°E

Location
- Forest Road; Barkingside, London, IG6 3HB; England

Information
- Type: Voluntary aided school
- Motto: "If I am not for myself, who will be for me? If I am only for myself, who am I? If not now, when?" Ethics of the Fathers, 1:14
- Religious affiliation: Modern Orthodox Judaism
- Established: 1993
- Founder: Mr Alastair Falk
- Local authority: Redbridge
- Department for Education URN: 102861 Tables
- Ofsted: Reports
- President: Lord Alan Sugar
- Head teacher: Ms Michele Phillips
- Gender: Co-educational
- Age: 11 to 18
- Enrolment: 900
- Website: https://kshsonline.uk/

King Solomon High School is a Modern Orthodox Jewish comprehensive school located in Barkingside, Greater London, England. It was opened in 1993 by its first headmaster, Mr Alastair Falk.

In March 2007, it was announced that Spencer Lewis would be appointed the new headteacher of the school, replacing the previous headmaster, Rabbi James Kennard. According to The Jewish Chronicle, for 2011 non-Jewish students would make up 40% of the school. The school teaches mandatory Jewish Studies lessons to all of its pupils and offers a 2-week trip to Israel for students in Year 9 of the school. There used to be other school trips traditionally taken each year which was Belgium in Year 9. However, there are now no traditional trips to Belgium. There is also a 1-week trip to Poland for Year 12 6th form students. In the middle of 2013 it was announced that Spencer Lewis would be leaving Kantor King Solomon for other opportunities as Headmaster at Yavneh College. Jo Shuter was announced as his replacement. Following Jo Shuter's departure Dr Doherty was appointed to act as the interim(acting) headteacher.

In November 2016, the school was before formally renamed Kantor King Solomon High School after donations from Dr Moshe Kantor, the president of the European Jewish Congress. Following the 2022 Russian invasion of Ukraine, Dr Moshe Kantor has been sanctioned by the UK government and the school has been renamed back to King Solomon High School.

As a comprehensive school, it follows the National Curriculum which is as follows:

Years 9-11 GCSE, Years 12-13 (6th form) A levels (no longer available) and Tech Levels.

== Notable former pupils ==
- Stacey Solomon – The X Factor finalist of 2009
- Jack Payne – Huddersfield Town A.F.C football player
- Adam Langleben – former Labour politician and antisemitism campaigner, Director of Progressive Britain
- Katie Griffiths – Waterloo Road actress
