= Rabbinical College of Canada =

Private college in Montreal, Canada

- Yeshivas Tomchei Temimim Lubavitch
- Type: Chabad-Lubavitch Chasidic yeshiva
- Established: 1941
- Parent institution: Chabad Lubavitch
- Affiliations: Judaism
- President: Rabbi H. Feigelstock
- Principal: Rabbi Kaufman
- Location: Montreal, Quebec, Canada; 45.4928°N 73.6429°W

Rabbinical College of Canada (also known as Yeshivas Tomchei Temimim Lubavitch), is a Chabad rabbinical institution of higher education in Montreal, Quebec, Canada.

The yeshiva provides rabbinical ordination for its students (also known as "Tmimim") in the Chabad Hasidic community.

== History ==
Although the school was established by Rabbi Yosef Yitzchok Schneersohn from New York City in 1941, the yeshiva had an extensive history (not only in its hometown of Montreal, but in Eastern Europe as well). At one time, the school had one of the most respected rabbinical ordination programs, when it was under the work of Rabbi Isaac Schwei, Rabbi Yitzchak HaCohen Hendel and Rabbi Pinchas Hirschsprung, who were notable Torah scholars in Montreal.

The history of the institution began with the arrival of 9 Yeshiva students from Shanghai, China who fled Poland during World War II. Another set of teachers and students arrived from a Canadian POW holding camp in New Brunswick, (Austrian Jewish citizens deported from England during the war).

Many of the students in the 1940s were immigrants who has fled Europe, establishing a small traditional Jewish community in Montreal. When first opened, the school had 24 students; a year later, it had over 200 students.

The school was initially located on Avenue du Parc, in the Plateau Mont Royal district. From 1963, the yeshiva is located at 6405 Westbury Avenue on the corner of Avenue Plamondon in the Cote-des-Neiges district of Montreal.

== Notable alumni ==
- Moshe Gutnick

== See also ==
- Tomchei Temimim
