= Chaim Gutnick =

Australian Orthodox Jewish Chabad rabbi

Shneur Chaim (HaKohen) Gutnick (1921 – 25 October 2003) (Hebrew: שניאור-חיים הכהן גוטניק) was an Australian Orthodox Jewish Chabad rabbi.

== Early life ==
Gutnick was born in Zolotonosha, Ukraine; soon afterwards his family moved to Tel Aviv, and then in 1927 to London, where his father, Mordechai Zev Gutnick, a graduate of the Tomchei Temimim yeshiva, served as a Chabad Rabbi and Dayan. After his father's death, on 29 November 1931, Gutnick came under the influence of Yehezkel Abramsky. He was educated at the Jews' Free School in London, and then at the Telshe yeshiva in Lithuania. When the Second World War broke out, he escaped with a small group of refugees, including the wife and daughter of Eliyahu Eliezer Dessler, which eventually found its way to Australia in 1941. On the instruction of the Rebbe of Lubavitch, Rabbi Joseph Isaac Schneersohn he remained in Australia, and joined the Australian Army. He applied for a position as a chaplain, but was turned down at that time.

== Australia ==
After the war Gutnick's stepfather Osher Abramson accepted a rabbinic position in Sydney, Australia, and moved there together with Gutnick's mother and his brother, Sholom Gutnick. Gutnick married Rose Chester, and they had six children together. Their son Joseph Gutnick is a well-known Jewish philanthropist; their sons Mordechai Gutnick and Moshe Gutnick are prominent Orthodox Jewish rabbis in Australia. His son-in-law is Rabbi Pinchus Feldman, and a grandson, Moshe Hecht, is a singer/songwriter and is the lead singer of the Jewish folk rock group Moshe Hecht Band.

In 1958 Gutnick was offered the rabbinate of the newly constructed Elwood Talmud Torah Hebrew Congregation, in Elwood, Victoria; he served in that position until his death in 2003.

In 1967, Gutnick founded the Rabbinical Council of Victoria, and served as its president until his death. He was also honorary Rosh Yeshiva at the Rabbinical College of Australia and New Zealand, where he delivered a monthly lecture and examined the students.

Gutnick received the honour of unusually long private audiences with The Lubavitcher Rebbe, who gave him much advice in all areas of his work.

One such area was the construction of the Melbourne Eruv. Gutnick along with Yitzchok Dovid Groner were instructed to fiercely oppose the construction.

Gutnick also served as a chaplain in the Australian Defence Force.
