= Israel Brodie =

British orthodox chief rabbi

Rabbi Sir Israel Brodie KBE
- Sir Israel Brodie as Grand Chaplain of the United Grand Lodge of England

Chief Rabbi of Great Britain and the Commonwealth
- In office 1948–1965
- Preceded by: Joseph Herman Hertz
- Succeeded by: Immanuel Jakobovits

Personal details
- Born: 10 May 1895 Newcastle-upon-Tyne, England
- Died: 13 February 1979 (aged 83) Lambeth, London
- Resting place: Willesden United Synagogue Cemetery
- Education: Balliol College, Oxford

Sir Israel Brodie KBE (10 May 1895 – 13 February 1979) was the Chief Rabbi of Great Britain and the Commonwealth 1948–1965.

== Biography ==
He was educated at Balliol College, Oxford. He served as a Rabbi of Melbourne Hebrew Congregation in Australia from 1923 to 1937 and was influential in establishing the Zionist Federation of Australia in 1927, and also sat on the local Beth Din. He was evacuated from Dunkirk, and finished the War as Senior Jewish Chaplain aka Forces Rabbi. He became Chief Rabbi soon after the war at the age of 53 when he faced a difficult time due to the ending of the British Mandate in Palestine. He presided over the post-war expansion of the United Synagogue. A dignified man of great presence, he was regarded as a mellifluous preacher. He had impeccable English connections and was a freemason, rising to the senior appointment of "Grand Chaplain" in the United Grand Lodge of England.

Through the Conference of European Rabbis, which he founded and led, Brodie took a significant part in rebuilding the religious life of European Jewry after the Holocaust. Brodie undertook tours throughout the Commonwealth, and strengthened the community in a quiet but significant manner, although the last years of his tenure were overshadowed by religious dispute. Brodie banned Rabbi Dr Louis Jacobs, who questioned the orthodox notion that the Bible had been written by the hand of God, from becoming principal of Jews' College. On his retirement, he was knighted "for services to British Jewry"; the first Chief Rabbi to be so honoured, although his predecessor was appointed to the more restricted membership of the Order of the Companions of Honour.

Jewish titles
| Preceded by Joseph Herman Hertz | Chief Rabbi of the United Hebrew Congregations of the Commonwealth; 1948–1965 | Succeeded by Immanuel Jakobovits |
