= Religion and divorce =

Religious aspects of divorce

The relationship between religion and divorce is complicated and varied. Different religions have different perceptions of divorce. Some religions accept divorce as a fact of life, while others only believe it is right under certain circumstances like adultery. Also, some religions allow remarriage after divorce, and others believe it is inherently wrong. This article attempts to summarize these viewpoints of major world religions and some important traditions regarding divorce in each faith.

== Christianity ==
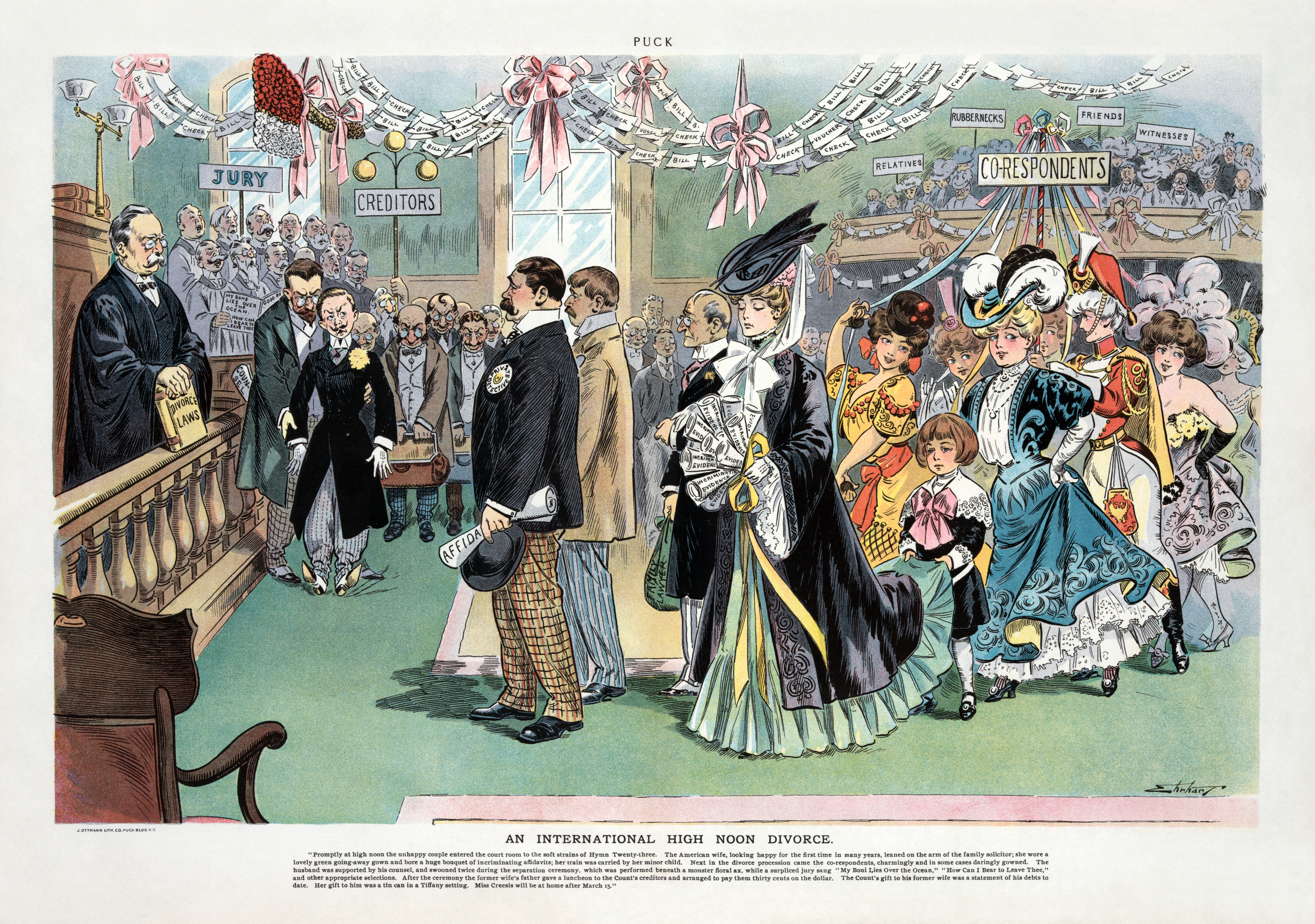
Cartoon parodying the 1906 divorce proceedings of Anna Gould (an American heiress and socialite) and Boni de Castellane (a French nobleman) in Paris, France. Boni de Castellane then sought an annulment from the Vatican so that he could be free to remarry in the Church. The annulment case was not finally settled until 1924, when the highest Vatican tribunal upheld the validity of the marriage and denied the annulment.

The great majority of Christian denominations affirm that marriage is intended as a lifelong covenant, but vary in their response to its dissolubility through divorce. The Catholic Church treats all consummated sacramental marriages as permanent during the life of the spouses, and therefore does not allow remarriage after a divorce if the other spouse still lives and the marriage has not been annulled. However, divorced Catholics are still welcome to participate fully in the life of the church so long as they have not remarried against church law, and the Catholic Church generally requires civil divorce or annulment procedures to have been completed before it will consider annulment cases. Annulment is not the same as divorce - it is a declaration that the marriage was never valid to begin with.

In order for a Catholic marriage to be considered valid - and therefore confirmed as a lifelong covenant and not subject to an annulment - there are some grounds that have to be met. Among these grounds are certainty that the espoused entered into sacramental marriage freely and with knowledgeable consent of the union. Couples who wish to gain a better understanding of the legitimacy of their marriage are often encouraged to seek counsel within their parish or diocese.

Other Christian denominations, including the Eastern Orthodox Church and many Protestant churches, will allow both divorce and remarriage even with a surviving former spouse, at least under certain conditions. For example, the Allegheny Wesleyan Methodist Connection, in its 2014 Discipline, teaches:

We believe that the only legitimate marriage is the joining of one man and one woman (Gen. 2:24; Rom. 7:2; 1 Cor. 7:10; Eph. 5:22, 23). We deplore the evils of divorce and remarriage. We regard adultery as the only scripturally justifiable grounds for divorce; and the party guilty of adultery has by his or her act forfeited membership in the church. In the case of divorce for other cause, neither party shall be permitted to marry again during the lifetime of the other; and violation of this law shall be punished by expulsion from the church (Matt. 5:32; Mark 10:11, 12). In the carrying out of these principles, guilt shall be established in accordance with judicial procedures set forth in The Discipline.

In societies that practised Puritanism, divorce was allowed if one partner in the marriage was not completely satisfied with the other, and remarriage was also allowed. The Church of England also took an indissolublist line until 2002, when it agreed to allow a divorced person to remarry in church during a former spouse's lifetime under "exceptional circumstances."

Bible commentary on divorce comes primarily from the gospels of Matthew, Mark, Luke, and the epistles of Paul. Jesus taught on the subject of divorce in three of the Gospels, and Paul gives a rather extensive treatment of the subject in his First Epistle to the Corinthians chapter 7: "Let not the wife depart from her husband...let not the husband put away his wife" (1 Corinthians 7:10-11), but he also includes the Pauline privilege. He again alludes to his position on divorce in his Epistle to the Romans, albeit an allegory, when he states "For the woman which hath an husband is bound by the law to her husband so long as he liveth. . . . So then if, while her husband liveth, she be married to another man, she shall be called an adulteress" (Romans 7:2-3).

Biblical scholars generally agree that the historical Jesus prohibited divorce and remarriage, though the tradition-history of the command remains debated. In Matthew 5:31–32, Matthew 19:1–10 and Mark 10:1–5, Jesus came into conflict with the Pharisees over divorce concerning their well-known controversy between Hillel and Shammai about Deuteronomy 24:1–4—as evidenced in Nashim Gittin 9:10 of the Mishnah. Do Jesus' answers to the Pharisees also pertain to Christians? Are Christians who adopt these teachings Judaizers? The differences in opinions about these questions usually arise over whether Jesus opposed the Law of Moses or just some of the viewpoints of the Pharisees, and whether Jesus just addressed a Jewish audience or expanded his audience to include Christians, for example "all nations" as in the Great Commission.

Since Deuteronomy 24:1-4 did not give Jewish women the right to directly initiate a divorce (See Agunah), did Jesus' answers "in the house" to his disciples expand the rights of women or did they merely acknowledge that some Jewish women, such as Herodias who divorced Herod Boethus, were wrongfully taking rights because Jewish women were being assimilated by other cultures? (See Matthew 14:3–4, Mark 10:10–12.) In other words, did Jesus confine his remarks to the Pharisaical questions, and did he appeal to his own authority by refuting the oral authority of the Pharisees with the formula "You have heard...But I say to you" in Matthew 5:20–48? Expressions used by Jesus such as "you have heard", "it hath been said", "it is written", "have you never read", "keep the commandments", "why do you break the commandments with your traditions?" and "what did Moses Command you?" seem to indicate that Jesus generally respected the Hebrew Bible and sometimes opposed Pharisaical Opinions. He was critical of the Pharisees.

== Buddhism ==
Buddhism has no religious concept of marriage (see Buddhist view of marriage). In Buddhism, marriage is a secular affair, subject to local customs.

== Islam ==
According to the Quran, marriage is intended to be unbounded in time, but when marital harmony cannot be attained, the Quran allows the spouses to bring the marriage to an end (2:231). Divorce in Islam can take a variety of forms, some initiated by the husband and some initiated by the wife. The main traditional legal categories are talaq (repudiation), khulʿ (mutual divorce), judicial divorce and oaths. The theory and practice of divorce in the Islamic world have varied according to time and place. Historically, the rules of divorce were governed by sharia, as interpreted by traditional Islamic jurisprudence, and they differed depending on the legal school. Historical practice sometimes diverged from legal theory. In modern times, as personal status (family) laws were codified, they generally remained "within the orbit of Islamic law", but control over the norms of divorce shifted from traditional jurists to the state.

== Judaism ==
Judaism has always accepted divorce. Judaism generally maintains that it is better for a couple to divorce than to remain together in a state of bitterness and strife. Divorce is obtainable by the mutual consent of both parties, with no outside authority's consent required.

=== Legal procedures ===
In general, it is accepted that for a Jewish divorce to be effective the husband must hand to the wife, and not vice versa, a bill of divorce called a get, while witnesses observe. Although the get is mainly used as proof of the divorce, sometimes the wife will tear the get to signal the end of the marriage and to ensure it is not reused. However, from ancient times, the get was considered to be very important to show all those who needed to have proof that the woman was in fact free from the previous marriage and free to remarry. In Jewish law, besides other things, the consequences of a woman remarrying and having a child while still legally married to another is profound: the child would be a mamzer, an "estranged person" to be avoided. Also, the woman would be committing adultery should she remarry while still legally married to another. An enactment called Herem de-Rabbenu Gershom (the proscription of Gershom ben Judah, accepted universally throughout European Jewish communities), prohibited a husband from divorcing his wife against her will.

In halakha (Jewish law), divorce is an act of the parties to the marriage, which is different from the approach adopted by many other legal systems. That is, a Jewish divorce does not require a decree from a court. The function of the court, in the absence of agreement between the parties, is to decide whether the husband should be compelled to give the get or for the wife to accept the get. But, notwithstanding any such ruling, the parties remain married until such time as the husband actually delivers the get.

Jewish law, in effect, does not require proof or even an allegation of moral or other fault by either party. If both parties agree to a divorce and follow the prescribed procedure, then the court would not need to establish responsibility for the marriage break-down. In this sense it is a "no-fault" approach to divorce.

A woman who has been refused a get is typically referred to as an "agunah". Where pre-nuptial agreements are enforceable in civil courts, appropriate provisions may be made to compel the giving of the get by the husband in the event of a civil divorce being obtained. However, this approach has not been accepted universally, particularly by the Orthodox.

A wife can initiate a divorce process on several grounds (including lack of satisfaction in her sexual life). However, this right extends only so far as petitioning a court to force her husband to divorce her.

One part of the complex process of divorce in Judaism, is the creation of the get itself. The get is crafted with great care and responsibility in order to ensure that no mistakes create consequences in the future. For example, exactly twelve lines are written in permanent ink telling the names of both parties, place, and time of the divorce. Because of the danger of the birth of mamzerim if the process is not performed properly, and because divorce law is extraordinarily complex, the process is generally supervised by experts.

== Others ==
=== Wicca ===
The Wiccan equivalent of a divorce is described as a handparting. Wiccans traditionally see either a high priest or high priestess to discuss things out before a divorce. However a handfasting (marriage) that falls apart peacefully does not necessarily need a handparting.

=== Unitarian Universalism ===
In Unitarian Universalism, because they affirm the "right of conscience", divorce is allowed and should be a decision by the individual person and is seen as ending a rite of passage. Such divorces have sometimes taken the form of divorce rituals as far back as the 1960s. Divorces are largely seen as a life choice.
