= Malka Leifer affair =

Allegations of child sex abuse in Australia and subsequent Israel extradition incident

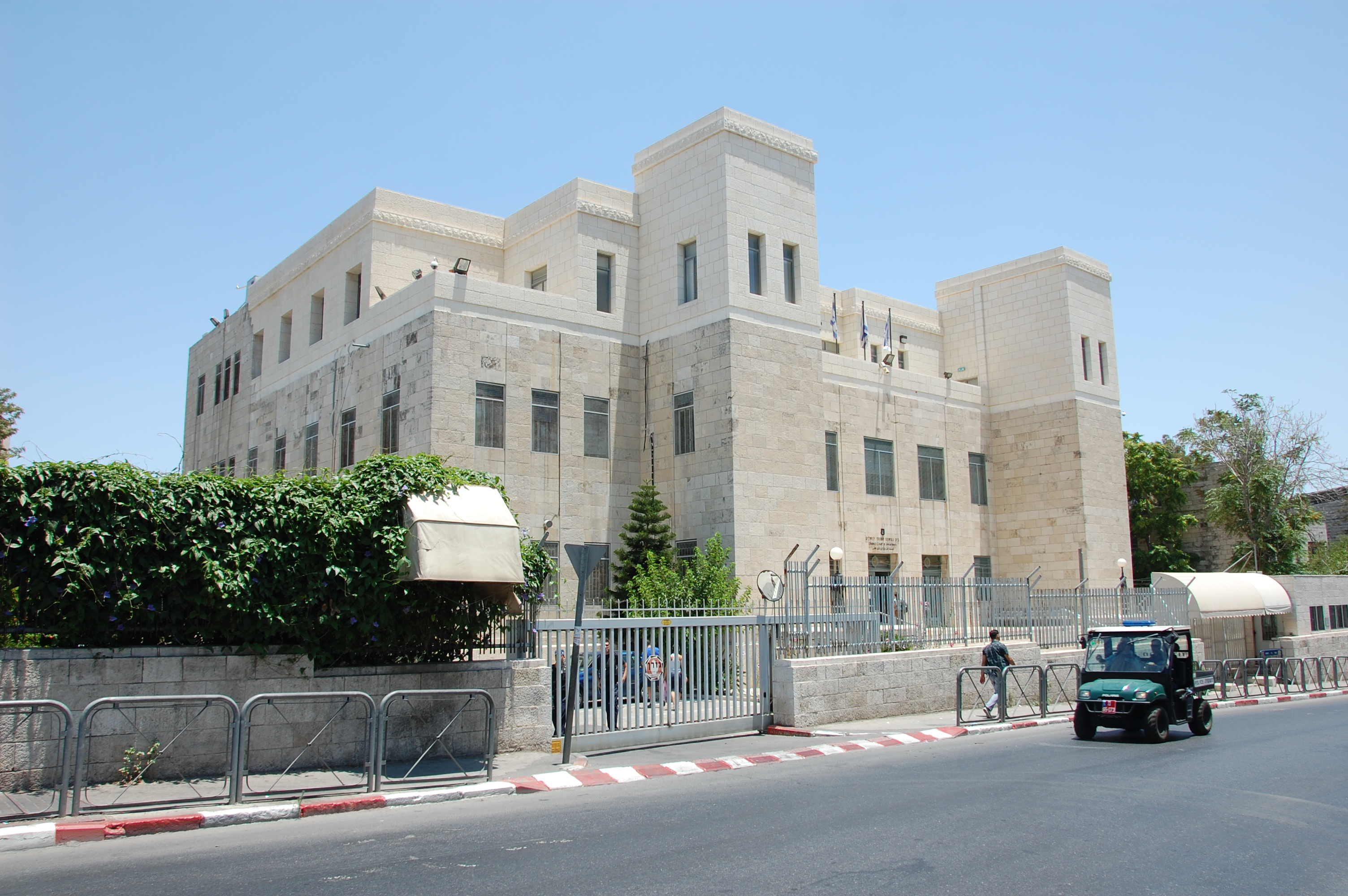
- The Jerusalem District Court, where proceedings related to the Leifer case were held
- Native name: Hebrew: פרשת מלכה לייפר
- Date: Between 2003 and 2007
- Venue: Adass Israel School (sexual abuse case), State of Israel (extradition case)
- Location: Melbourne, Victoria, Australia; Israel; the West Bank
- Type: Child sex abuse; Extradition dispute
- Theme: Sexual abuse of ultra-Orthodox Jewish children in a school setting, interference with extradition case
- Target: Jewish children
- Perpetrators: Malka Leifer (sexual abuse case), Yaakov Litzman (extradition case)
- Outcome: Leifer was extradited from Israel to Australia and tried before an Australian court.; Yaakov Litzman resigned from the Knesset and entered a guilty plea bargain for official interference with Leifer's extradition.
- Convicted: Malka Leifer
- Charges: 70 charges of rape, indecent assault, committing an indecent act with a child, and sexual penetration of a child
- Trial: by judge and jury (February–April 2023)
- Convictions: Guilty of 18 charges of rape and child sexual abuse
- Sentence: 15 years in custody; non-parole period of 11 years and six months (August 2023)
- Civil penalties: A$1.27 million in exemplary damages to the victims against the school and Leifer
- Other matters: Litzman plead guilty for breach of trust and received a minor fine. No conviction was recorded. (August 2022)

The Malka Leifer affair (Hebrew: פרשת מלכה לייפר, lit. 'Malka Leifer episode') is a criminal case regarding child sex abuse at the Adass Israel School, a Jewish religious school in Melbourne, Australia, and a subsequent 15-year-long extradition case involving Israeli authorities. A former principal, Malka Leifer, faced trial on 70 sex offence charges laid by Victoria Police, with accusations from at least eight alleged victims. Leifer fled Australia for Israel under suspicious circumstances shortly before a warrant could be issued, and remained in Israeli-controlled territory from 2008 until January 2021, under varying levels of police and court supervision, pending the resolution of her extradition case. Leifer's trial did not address other alleged sex crimes in Israel and the West Bank because they did not occur in Australia.

The degree of freedom she enjoyed under Israeli jurisdiction prompted worldwide media coverage and criticism of Israel's judicial system; activist Manny Waks described the case as "a farce" and "an embarrassment". Leifer lived an apparently normal life for some time in the Israeli settlement of Immanuel in the West Bank, despite a court ruling that she was mentally unfit for proceedings. She was eventually rearrested after media and police scrutiny of her behaviour, but continued to evade extradition, with more than 70 court hearings and appeals requested by her legal team, and delays due to the COVID-19 pandemic. In January 2021, after almost 13 years as a fugitive, Leifer was extradited to Australia; she appeared before a Melbourne judge via video link in April 2021, her first appearance in Australian court. On 3 April 2023 Leifer was found guilty of 18 charges, including rape and child sexual abuse. Leifer was sentenced in August 2023 to 15 years' prison for sexually abusing two students in her care and is eligible for parole in June 2029.

In 2015, the Supreme Court of Victoria awarded a judgement of over AU$1 million against the school, as well as $150,000 of exemplary damages personally against Leifer. A further investigation, into the actions of some members of the Adass Israel community for helping Leifer leave Australia, continued after the Supreme Court judgement. Israeli police investigated and indicted former Minister of Health Yaakov Litzman, following an investigation into official interference with Leifer's extradition case. Litzman eventually pleaded guilty to breach of trust in the case in early 2022.

== Background ==
The Adass Israel Congregation is a Jewish group in Melbourne that traces its origins to a split in the Elwood Shule in the early 1940s; some of its early members were boys and men who had been sent to Australia by the British on the infamous Dunera in 1941. The community's synagogue is in Ripponlea, and its school and chevra kadisha (Jewish funeral society) are located in nearby St Kilda East and Elsternwick.

The community is "ultra-Orthodox". Children are raised without television, Internet access or radio, but have access to Jewish newspapers and magazines that cover worldly matters. After the age of eight, boys and girls are kept entirely separate outside family homes, and the stories they are told never involve friendships between boys and girls. There is no sex education in schools of the community, but before marriage the bride and groom attend educational classes to discuss sex and other topics about marriage. The rabbi of the community acts as the ultimate authority for members.

Leifer was born in Tel Aviv, the youngest of four children in an ultra-Orthodox family. She married a Canadian rabbi when she was 20 years old and they had six sons and two daughters together; the youngest and oldest child were born approximately 17 years apart. She left Israel for Australia in 2001 when offered a job at Adass Israel. It has been mistakenly reported that she at some point became an Australian citizen.

== Allegations of abuse ==
In 2007, a woman in Israel, Dassi Erlich, (Note: Earlier news reports did not name the individual but in March 2017 she decided to come forward and her name was widely published.) sought counseling when she started to have recurrent nightmares and anxiety about events that had taken place at Adass Israel School when she was in high school. These incidents allegedly happened at the hands of Leifer, the principal of the school. After an arranged marriage in 2006, Erlich had moved to Israel with her husband. In February 2008, Erlich's therapist in Israel contacted a psychologist in Melbourne, who, in turn, contacted a senior teacher she knew at the school. The information passed on is that there were substantial allegations of "inappropriate conduct" by Leifer. The teacher phoned Erlich, and was convinced of the claims that there had been "clearly sexualised behaviour" by Leifer and that "important boundaries had been crossed".

The teacher then confronted Leifer who denied that there was any problem and subsequently reported the matter to two senior rabbis and with other rabbis, a barrister and a psychologist. A meeting was arranged with the president and some members of the school board. Leifer was telephoned at the meeting and denied the allegations, saying: "You have destroyed my reputation. I'm not going to stand for this." On the evening that the allegations came to light, in March 2008, the wife of a school board member rang a travel agent to say a flight to Israel was needed urgently. The school arranged, paid for, and booked tickets for Leifer and four of her eight children on an aircraft that departed at 1:20 a.m. the same night, without having informed the police. The police later investigated the school.

Leifer's husband, Rabbi Yaakov Yosef (Jacob) Leifer, fled to Israel with her, where he now heads the small Chust Hassidic community in Immanuel where he and his wife had been living since 2016, and where she was arrested. In June 2018, Immanuel was cited as a "haven for paedophiles" by The Sydney Morning Herald, which exposed further alleged child sexual abuse there by Leifer, committed "without consequence." The father of Rabbi Leifer and former leader of the Khust Hasidic, Grand Rabbi Baruch Pinchas Leifer, was arrested, in January 2022, and charged with historical sexual abuse of a minor to whom he is related, and a then 18-year-old male; he denies the charges, which are before Jerusalem Magistrate Courts. In late 2023, one of Leifer's sons was reportedly arrested after confessing to sexually assaulting a 10-year-old boy in El'ad.

== Legal proceedings ==
=== Extradition case in Israel ===
As a result of an investigation by Victoria Police, a warrant was issued against Leifer in 2014 for 74 child sex offences concerning at least eight pupils, and an extradition request was placed with Israel. Leifer was arrested by Israeli police in August 2014, and placed under house arrest in Bnei Brak, where she was required to wear an electronic tag.

At her various extradition hearings, Leifer claimed that she suffered extreme anxiety and panic attacks in the lead-up to the hearing; she received a delay. She subsequently deferred the hearings numerous times, claiming mental health issues, with one judge suggesting that the case could potentially be delayed up to a decade. In June 2016 an Israeli court suspended Leifer's extradition hearings and home detention altogether, requiring only biennial psychiatric reviews to determine whether she was capable of attending court in Israel.

In February 2018, Leifer was rearrested by Israeli police after an investigation into whether she had been systematically feigning mental illness to avoid extradition. The police investigation followed revelations by private investigators, who captured over 200 hours of video of Leifer, showing her leading a normal life, even though her defense team claimed that she was incapacitated due to her mental illness. Her legal team claimed that the arrest and the reopening of the case had been spurred by political pressure from Australia, and were not a legal matter. A new psychological assessment showed her fit to stand trial in Australia, but her extradition was temporarily delayed, to allow her legal team to review the new information. She was being kept in detention rather than house arrest.

Rosenbaum Communications public relations firm owner Ronen Tzur led a strategic smear campaign to block Leifer's extradition. Once the smear campaign was uncovered by Yedioth Ahronoth, Leifer cut ties with Tzur; her attorney, Yehuda Freid, described the campaign as "inappropriate".

On 7 March 2018, the judge ruled that Leifer was to be released, while further investigation was to take place. She was released into the custody of Rabbi Yitzchak Dovid Grossman, who had given testimony in her favor, claiming it was a "humiliation" for her to remain in custody. In 2016, Grossman had also twice appeared before a court in South Africa to negotiate the release from prison of former Shuvu Banim Torah Academy school dean Rabbi Eliezer Berland, who would later confess to rape and assault. Grossman soon withdrew his support, and Leifer was ordered held in Israel's only women's prison until extradition proceedings were complete. The Jerusalem District Court then remanded Leifer and ordered a second round of psychiatric testing to see whether she was fit to stand trial for extradition. The court's medical committee ruled in July 2019 that the accused had faked mental illness in order to avoid extradition.

In May 2020, the Israeli court held that Leifer was fit to stand trial for extradition to Australia, and rejected the claim of mental illness that she had been asserting since extradition proceedings were initiated in 2014. Leifer was extradited to Australia on 25 January 2021.

=== Criminal case in Australia ===
Leifer did not request bail in her first Australian court appearance and was thus remanded and remained jailed pending trial. Her legal team announced an intent to cross-examine accusers Dassi Erlich, Elly Saper and Nicole Meyer, and called testimony from a former Adass Israel counselor regarding emails from 2011, describing two of the accusers as motivated by financial gain. Leifer was nevertheless ordered to stand trial on 70 charges, including multiple counts each of rape, indecent assault, committing an indecent act with a child, and sexual penetration of a child.

The trial, before a jury, began on 7 February 2023, and was planned to last five weeks, before Judge Mark Gamble. The judge imposed a gag order on the trial, restricting the media from reporting some of the details of the case.

On 22 March 2023, both the prosecution and the defense finalised their cases in front of the court and the jury was sent to deliberate the case. On 3 April 2023, Leifer was found guilty of the rape and indecent assault of Dassi Erlich and Elly Sapper but not guilty of abusing Nicole Meyer.

=== Civil case in Australia ===
One of Leifer's accusers, Dassi Erlich, revealed her allegations publicly in March 2017 and began campaigning for Leifer's extradition from Israel and for changes in the Adass Israel community. Before revealing her name, she had sued the school in a civil case. In September 2015, after the school had refused to settle out of court, the Supreme Court of Victoria in Melbourne awarded Erlich AU$1.27 million in damages from the Adass Israel School and the alleged perpetrator.

As part of her evidence, Erlich described the extreme sexual naivety of the children in the community, and how that was used against her, even being unaware of the most basic elements of relationships and any sexual activity. This continued through high school and after, when Erlich was given a job at the school, where the abuse continued.

The judge, Jack Rush, said "that the sexual abuse occurred under the guise of Jewish education by the headmistress of the school makes the breach of trust associated with the abuse monstrous. The evidence discloses the sole motivation of the suspect in her dealings with the plaintiff was her own sexual gratification." He described the breach of trust as evil, and ordered the perpetrator to personally pay $150,000 exemplary damages to Erlich.

Justice Rush said that, at the time Leifer had fled Australia for Israel, the president of the school board knew of eight additional allegations of sexual abuse of other girls. The school had had an obligation to report the allegations to the police prior to arranging her departure. He rejected the school's argument that it had been a "legal obligation" to pay her air fares. The school argued that it was not liable because it was the congregation, not the school, that was the employer, but the judge also rejected this.

Two of Erlich's sisters, Ellie Sapper and Nicole Meyer, who had also been abused, received out-of-court settlements from the school, independent of Erlich's case.

Erlich remained in the public eye, campaigning for the return of Leifer and for abuse survivors, including meeting with many community leaders and politicians. Her coming forward to secular authorities made her a traitor in the eyes of some in her community, which she subsequently left.

Erlich and her siblings stated that they wanted to face Leifer personally in court, as opposed to over video conferencing; many victims in Israel and other countries would have to resort to video conferencing in order to testify.

== Aftermath ==
Meir Shlomo Kluwgant was appointed principal of Adass Israel school in June 2017. There was significant anger in the community with the appointment, because of Kluwgant's performance as a witness in the Royal Commission into Institutional Responses to Child Sexual Abuse. In February 2015, he stepped down from the numerous communal posts he held because of his response to the evidence of the father of a sexual abuse victim at another ultra-Orthodox school in Melbourne. He had sent a text message to the editor of The Australian Jewish News, accusing the father of being "a lunatic on the fringe, guilty of neglecting his own children". The father's evidence had been that his family had been targeted and ostracised by religious leaders when he had gone public with his allegations.

The Victorian minister of education said he understood the concern and asked for an explanation from the school. The head of Adass Israel, Rabbi Zvi Beck, asked for further consultation on the appointment. In August 2017, Kluwgant resigned from the school.

In 2018, Kluwgant commenced an action for defamation against a spokesman for the victims at the school who, he claimed, had contacted the school when his pending appointment was announced, to say he was "the scum of the earth" and later to call for him to be dismissed.

== Political ramifications ==
In October 2017, Erlich and two of her sisters went to Israel to campaign for Leifer's extradition, meeting the Minister of Justice, the senior prosecutor in the department of international affairs and members of the Knesset. The following month Australian prime minister Malcolm Turnbull met his Israeli counterpart, Benjamin Netanyahu, and raised the matter of the delayed extradition with him.

Two premiers of Victoria supported the efforts to extradite Leifer. Ted Baillieu supported the family, and helped set up the meeting between Malcolm Turnbull and Erlich, Sapper and Meyer. Baillieu also accompanied the sisters to Israel to meet with officials there. Daniel Andrews also raised the case with Netanyahu, who said he would have a fresh look at the situation.

David Southwick, representing the electorate of Caulfield, where the school is located, delivered a petition of 17,000 signatures in July 2017 to lawmakers in Israel.

Federally, the extradition of Leifer was a bi-partisan issue, with Mark Dreyfus confirming in 2018 that Labor would continue to press for her to face justice in Australia.

Members of Australia's Jewish community also called for the extradition. Israeli victim advocates and assault survivors rallied outside the Jerusalem District Court in March 2019, calling for Leifer to be deported.

=== Alleged interference by Israeli officials ===
In February 2019, it was revealed that Israel's deputy health minister, Yaakov Litzman, was questioned by police on the suspicion that he had been using his position to prevent Leifer's extradition. It was alleged that Litzman pressured doctors to falsify psychiatric evaluations that deemed Leifer unfit to stand trial, thereby preventing her extradition. Litzman claimed that everything he did was legal, and that he was acting "for the good of the public". It was revealed that Leifer had previously held a position at a school run by the ultra-Orthodox group Litzman is associated with. In April 2021, Israeli police recommended prosecution of Litzman for his actions to protect Leifer. In June 2022, Litzman resigned from the Knesset after he signed a plea agreement admitting breach of trust in January that year. He received a minor fine.

== See also ==
- Child sexual abuse in Australia
- Jewish Community Watch
- Australia–Israel relations
- Extradition law in Australia
- Australia and Israel bilateral treaty on extradition and criminal matters
