= Dayenu (organisation) =

LGBTQ+ organisation based in Sydney, Australia

- Established: 2000
- Founder: Dawn Cohen
- President: David Klarnett
- Website: www.dayenu.org.au

Dayenu is an LGBTQ+ organisation based in Sydney, Australia. The word Dayenu means "enough" in Hebrew, and the group uses it to mean that they have had "enough" of homophobia.

== History ==
The group Dayenu began as an idea in 1999 to create a gay and Jewish float for the 2000 Sydney Gay and Lesbian Mardi Gras. After the parade the group began in order to offer permanent resources for LGBTQ+ Jews in Sydney.

In 2013 Dayenu celebrated its bar mitzvah as it turned 13 at the Sydney Gay and Lesbian Mardi Gras. The group celebrated by wearing pink kippot and rainbow tallit, as well as featuring a large glittery Star of David.

== Goals ==
The group's mission is to:

- Provide outreach and support;
- Deliver educational information and public representation; and,
- Organise social activities for Jewish gays and lesbians and their partners, friends and family.

== Services and events ==
=== Religious services ===
Dayenu hosts synagogue services and weekly Shabbat dinners, as well as an annual Passover Seder. Emanuel Synagogue in Sydney supports Dayenu and hosts many of their religious events.

=== Social events ===
Dayenu hosts movie nights, bowling, dinners, and pub nights.

=== Mardi Gras ===
Sydney has an annual Gay and Lesbian Mardi Gras in which Dayenu participates and has a float. The group has participated every year since the 2000 parade, except for 2006 when inactivity and lack of funds precluded the group's involvement. The group also has a large Shabbat dinner to celebrate the Mardi Gras.

=== Youth Services ===
Dayenu is a parent organisation to the group Young Dayenu, which is a group of younger Jewish LGBTQ+ people.
