= Melbourne Beth Din =

Orthodox Jewish court in Melbourne, Australia

The Melbourne Beth Din (MBD) is an Orthodox / Chassidic Jewish court in the city of Melbourne, Australia. Located in Caulfield North, Victoria, it rules mostly on divorces and conversions although it does rule on other matters as well.

== History ==
The MBD has existed in various iterations. The first Beth Din was set up with the assistance of Moses Rintel, who later served as the head of the Beth Din. This was the first Beth Din in the British Empire outside of London.

There were a series of Melbourne rabbis who served on the Beth Din, including:

- Harry Freedman, a widely respected scholar and senior translator at Soncino Press
- Sir Israel Brodie, later Chief Rabbi of the Commonwealth
- Joseph Abrahams
- Elias Blaubaum
- Jacob Danglow
- Isaac Jacob Super, head of the Melbourne United Shechitah Board
- Yonason Abraham, who later served on the London Beth Din

Having been re-established in 1961 after communication with the Sydney Beth Din, the Beth Din had a series of long standing chairmen, beginning with Isaac Rapaport and Sholem Gutnick. Under Gutnick's leadership, the Beth Din was accused of nepotism, lack of transparency and financial irregularities in what was described as a "one-man operation". Gutnick would appoint judges without consulting other rabbis in the community, despite the protests of the communal rabbinate. Following Gutnick's tenure, the Beth Din was closed down and restructured under the joint control of the Rabbinical Council of Victoria (RCV) and the Council of Orthodox Synagogue of Victoria (COSV), and Mordechai Gutnick was appointed senior judge.

In 2017, the MBD conducted a wide-ranging review of its procedures that included rabbis currently sitting on the Beth Din, other communal rabbis, and lay people.

== Conversions ==
One of the roles of the MBD is to oversee Orthodox conversions to Judaism. This process is often mired in controversy, with London at times overruling the decisions of the Australian Beth Din, and the topic causing tension between Joseph Abrahams and his community, forcing the rabbi to briefly resign his post. This difficulty in conversion in the early days of the settlement of Australia led to many Jews marrying non-Jews and assimilating into Australian culture. Today many of the conversions performed are done for marriage or due to Jewish ancestry.

Today, the process of converting internationally is mired in controversy and politics especially in Israel. In this environment, the MBD is one of the few internationally recognised conversion programs. However, the program regularly takes several years, and requires extensive examinations before the Beth Din will consider a convert. However, in spite of this most Orthodox synagogues in Melbourne will direct conversion candidates to the MBD.

In recent years a number of conversion courts have been set up independently of the MBD. These have been run by rabbis Yaron Gottlieb, Meir Rabi, and the Ark Centre.

The conversions performed by the Ark Centre caused some controversy when MBD rejected all their conversions, although they offered a path to conversion for those who were converted through the Ark. It is unclear what the status of the converts who did not take up the path to conversion. This decision was a rejection of Rabbi Yisrael Rosen who oversaw the conversions from Israel, and in opposition to the Halacha, and a longstanding convention in Orthodoxy.

== Divorces ==
The other main focus of the MBD is in the area of divorces. In Jewish law a divorce can be vetoed by either side (but the consequences are more serious for the woman) there are a number of instances of both the man and the woman refusing to give the bill of divorce (gett). The MBD have a number of ways of dealing with this, including a pre-nuptial agreement, although this agreement in Australia is more of a guide and is not binding in any way on the two parties in the event of a divorce.

The MBD deal with about 40 divorces per annum, and have at times needed to rule in cases of agunah, or gett refusal. In a landmark case, the Victorian Magistrates Court ruled that gett refusal constitutes psychological and emotional abuse, however there are limits on this and there is danger that any law to try and force one party to provide a gett could run foul of the Australian constitution.

While the Beth Din have tried to ease the suffering, they are very conservative in their interpretation of Halacha, and their procedures can cause cases to extend a lot longer than necessary.

== Other rulings ==
The MBD has made a number of rulings over the years. An earlier ruling was made by the Beth Din during the tenure of Rabbi Brodie against communally organised ball sports on Shabbat.

More recently the MBD has made strong statements against same sex marriage, and against the establishment of an eruv.

The Beth Din at times have attempted to establish a civil tribunal, but these attempts have thus far failed. Despite this the MBD have called for all Jews to approach them and have strongly discouraged people from going to the secular courts.

They are also attempting to create a register of who is a Jew for the purposes of marriage within the Orthodox community.

== Alternative courts ==
There are a number of religious courts that claim jurisdiction in Victoria besides the MBD. The Progressive movement and Conservative movement each maintain a Beth Din, as does the Haredi Adass Yisrael community.

In addition to these there are a number of ad hoc Orthodox conversion courts.

== Current personnel ==
=== Dayanim ===
- Rabbi Mordechai Gutnick AM
- Rabbi Avrohom Yehudah Kievman
- Rabbi Yisroel Greenwald
- Rabbi Mordechai Berman
- Rabbi Menachem Sabbach

=== Board members ===
- Rabbi Chaim Cowen - Director
- Elka Gaensler - Director and Secretary
- Rabbi Yoseph Nerenberg - Director
- David Lindell - Director

=== Other roles ===
- Rabbi Schneier Lange - Registrar
- Rabbi Philip Heilbrunn OAM - Introductory Assessor of Candidates for Conversion
