= Moshe Hecht Band =

American Hasidic folk rock band

- Origin: Brooklyn, New York City
- Genres: Jewish rock Indie folk Reggae rock
- Years active: 2010–present
- Labels: Aderet
- Members: Moshe Hecht; Schneur Menaker; Evgheni Goncear; Bryan Hershkowitz; Paul Alpert; Josh Henderson
- Website: moshehecht.com

The Moshe Hecht Band is an American Hasidic folk rock band based in Brooklyn, New York. Formed in 2010 by eponymous frontman Moshe Hecht, the band also consists of several local musicians and has toured throughout New York. In 2011, they released their debut album, Heart Is Alive.

== History ==
In 2010, Brooklyn-based singer-songwriter Moshe Hecht gathered together several local musicians to form the Moshe Hecht Band. Since forming, the band has played at venues throughout New York such as the Knitting Factory and the Canal Room, as well as events like the 2012 Celebrate Israel Parade and a Shemspeed showcase at the CMJ Music Marathon.

Their debut album, Heart Is Alive, was recorded in Seattle and New York City with producers Steven Ray Allen, Alon Cohen, and Jake Antelis, and was released through Aderet Music on October 18, 2011.

== Musical style ==
The Moshe Hecht Band's music is primarily derived from rock, folk, and reggae, as well as traditional Hasidic melodies. Hecht himself has expressed his affinity for secular artists such as Bob Dylan, Simon & Garfunkel, and Bob Marley, as well as Jewish musicians such as Shlomo Carlebach and Isaac Bitton. Lyrically, Hecht's songwriting tends to be overtly religious, with Heart Is Alive mixing traditional Hebrew prayers with English lyrics about the life of the soul and man's relationship with God. Despite this, he has stated that he feels his music to be universal: "Any person of faith will find power and inspiration in my music."

== Members ==
- Moshe Hecht — lead vocals
- Schneur Menaker – guitar, keyboards
- Evgheni Goncear – bass guitar
- Bryan Hershkowitz – drums
- Paul Alpert — percussion
- Josh Henderson – violin

== Discography ==
Albums

- Heart Is Alive (October 18, 2011)

Singles

- "Believers" (June 15, 2011; music video)
