= Mordechai Gutnick =

Australian rabbi

Mordechai Gutnick AM
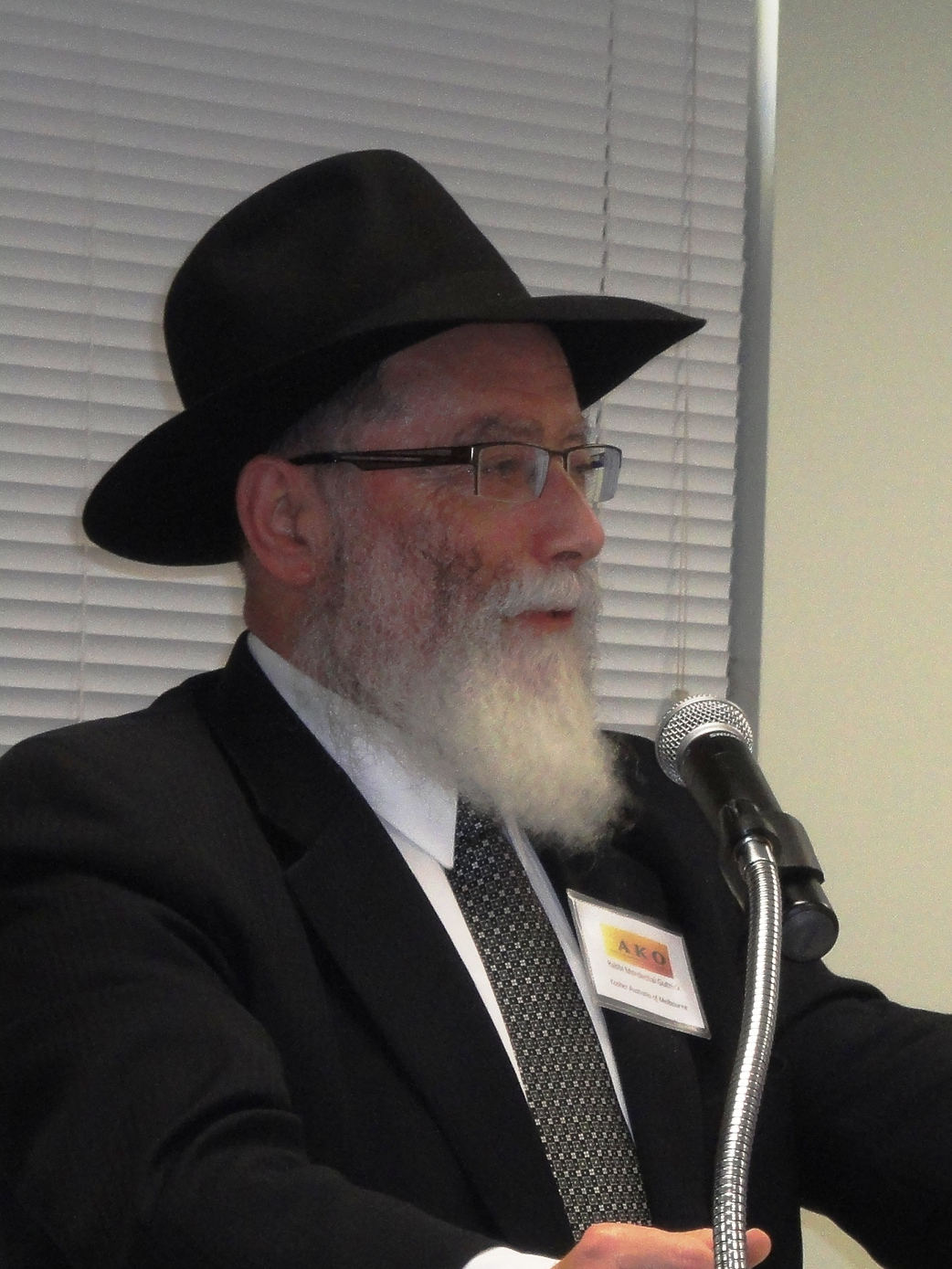
- Occupation: Rabbi
- Parent: Rabbi Chaim Gutnick
- Relatives: Joseph Gutnick (brother); Moshe Gutnick (brother)

Rabbi Mordechai Zev Gutnick (Hebrew: מרדכי זאב הכהן גוטניק) is an Australian Orthodox Jewish rabbi. Gutnick has served as a member of rabbinical courts in Melbourne and Sydney and various Australian rabbinical associations. He is associated with the Chabad-Lubavitch Hasidic movement and is the eldest son of Rabbi Chaim Gutnick.

== Biography ==
Gutnick was born in Sydney, Australia. His father, born in Ukraine, was Rabbi Chaim Gutnick, a Holocaust survivor. Rabbi Moshe Gutnick and businessman Joseph Gutnick are his brothers.

He received his rabbinic ordination in New York 1972. He served as an outreach lecturer shaliach ("emissary") for the National Committee for the Furtherance of Jewish Education, visiting and lecturing in many communities throughout the US and Canada, and was also a lecturer and counselor at the Machon Chana institute in New York. He received rabbinic training from Rabbi Pinchus Hirschprung among other rabbinic figures.

At the behest of his mentor, the Lubavitcher Rebbe, Gutnick returned to Sydney in 1974 to serve as the rabbi of Strathfield and District Hebrew Congregation. At that time he was also appointed as dayan of the Sydney Beth Din (rabbinical court) and worked in the field of kashrut supervision.

In 1982, Gutnick moved to Melbourne to serve as the rabbi of the North Eastern Jewish Centre in Doncaster, where he served for 14 years, and then as rabbi of the Elsternwick Jewish Community, a congregation affiliated with the Mizrachi Organisation in Melbourne. In 2003 he was appointed rabbi of the Elwood Talmud Torah Hebrew Congregation, succeeding his late father, Rabbi Chaim Gutnick.

At the turn of the century, the Melbourne Beth Din was shut down amid allegations of nepotism, lack of transparency and financial irregularities. After the Beth Din was restructured and reopened in 2002, Gutnick was appointed as a senior judge and currently serves as its Av Beth Din.

Gutnick has served as Rabbinic Administrator of the Kosher Australia agency (formerly Melbourne Kashrut) since 1997. He also lectures regularly on halachic and general Jewish topics.

Gutnick, like his father, served as a Military Chaplain in the Australian Army. He received a commission to the rank of Captain in 1984 and subsequently served as Jewish Chaplain for 19 years, until reaching his retirement age from that position in 2003.

In 2008 Gutnick officiated at the first Jewish wedding ever hosted by Australia's Parliament House in Canberra, when the federal member for Melbourne Ports Michael Danby married Amanda Mendes Da Costa. The wedding was attended by Australian Prime Minister Kevin Rudd and his deputy among 150 guests.

In August 2014, Gutnick was elected President of the Rabbinical Council of Victoria. Gutnick has also served as president of the Organisation of Rabbis of Australia and in this role he took a stand against Jews using civil courts to settle their disputes.

In 2021, the Australian Government honored Gutnick with the Member of the Order of Australia (AM) award, in recognition of his "significant service to the Jewish community".
