= Elwood Talmud Torah Hebrew Congregation =

Elwood Talmud Torah Hebrew Congregation Elwood Synagogue / Elwood Shule
- Hebrew: ק"ק בית אברהם
- Location in Melbourne

Religion
- Affiliation: Orthodox Judaism
- Ecclesiastical or organisational status: Synagogue
- Leadership: Rabbi Mordechai Gutnick
- Status: Active

Location
- Location: 39 Dickens Street, Elwood, Melbourne, Victoria
- Country: Australia
- Coordinates: 37°52′23″S 144°59′1″E

Architecture
- Established: 1931; 95 years ago
- Completed: 1957 (Dickens Street)

Website
- ww.elwoodshule.org

The Elwood Talmud Torah Hebrew Congregation (Hebrew: ק"ק בית אברהם), also known as Elwood Synagogue or Elwood Shule, is a historically significant Orthodox synagogue located in the Melbourne suburb of Elwood, Victoria, Australia. The congregation played an important role in accommodating Melbourne's large population of Jewish Holocaust survivors following World War II.

== Overview ==
The congregation was formed around 1931 or 1932 as a prayer service in a private home. In 1938 the congregation moved to 40 Mitford Street where a part-time Talmud Torah was established in addition to regular prayer services. Prior to World War II the congregation grew with the arrival of Jewish European immigrants. In 1939-40 several members broke away and formed their own congregation, later known as the Adass Israel Congregation.

Elwood Shule flourished during and especially following World War II, as a large number of Jewish Holocaust survivors settled in the area. Services took place in halls in Acland Street, St Kilda, and Hennessy Avenue, Elwood during peak periods, before larger premises were acquired at 26 Avoca Avenue in 1942.

The synagogue's current site, at 39 Dickens Street, was purchased in the early 1950s by synagogue President Abe Sicree. A new synagogue building was constructed and dedicated at the site in 1957, in time for the High Holidays of that year. The following year Rabbi Chaim Gutnick was appointed Chief Minister of the synagogue, a position he held for some forty-five years until his retirement in 2003. A new school campus was constructed on synagogue premises by Moriah College of Elwood in the early 1960s. Following Moriah College's demise the campus was occupied by Mt Scopus Memorial College and later Yesodei HaTorah College. In 1973 the synagogue building was renovated and expanded to a seating capacity of 1068. In 2003 Rabbi Mordechai Gutnick succeeded his father Chaim as Chief Minister of the congregation.

In 2008 the Elwood Talmud Torah Hebrew Congregation celebrated its 75th anniversary. Federal member for Melbourne Ports Michael Danby, an Elwood resident, marked the occasion by paying tribute to the congregation in a speech before Australian Parliament on 16 October 2008, saying,

"It is very fortuitous, when viewed in retrospect, that this congregation was formed by central and east European migrants prior to the Second World War. These were the very people who were able to look after the refugees and the displaced persons who came off the ships after the Second World War and who, subsequently, filled the pews at this very special Shule."

A similar tribute was delivered before Victorian Parliament by Martin Foley.

== See also ==
- List of synagogues in Australia
- History of the Jews in Australia
