= Home Care Assistance =

Home Care Assistance Agency is an in-home senior care company with locations throughout northern Virginia, United States. The company provides non-medical, hourly, and live-in care.

The company is notable for providing free long-term care to Medicaid recipients, and it has partnered with various organizations, including the Anthem, OptimaHealth, Kaiser Parmaenta, Molina, Aetna, UnitedHealth, Virginia Medicaid, Virginia Health Department and the American Society on Aging.
