= Executive Council of Australian Jewry =

Jewish organisation in Australia

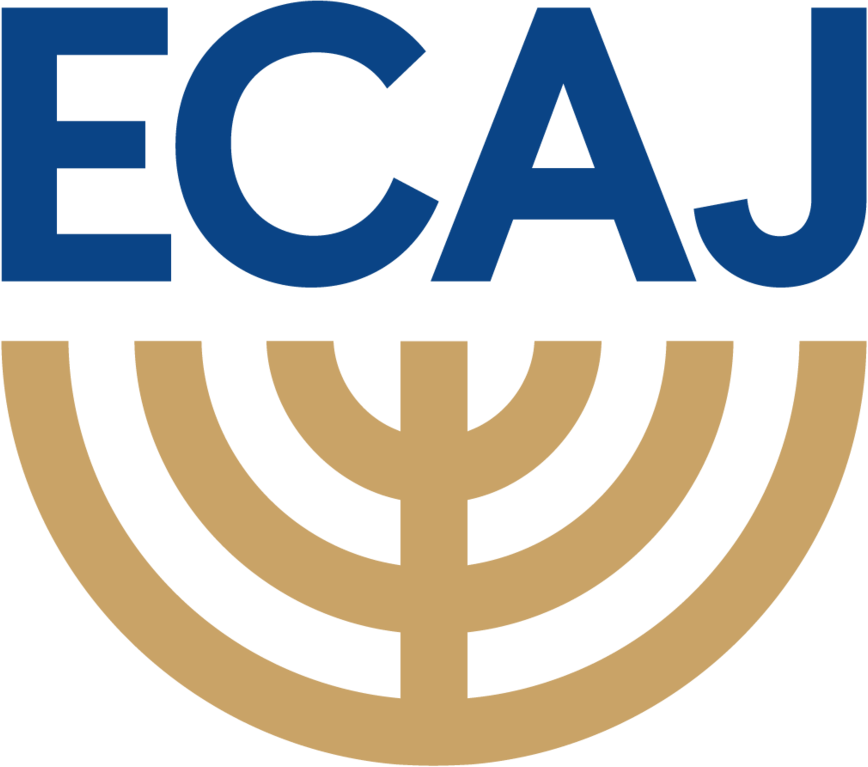
- Founded: 1944; 82 years ago
- Headquarters: Sydney, Australia
- Region served: Australia
- Co-CEOs: Alex Ryvchin; Peter Wertheim
- President: Daniel Aghion
- Website: www.ecaj.org.au

The Executive Council of Australian Jewry (ECAJ) is a peak body representing the Australian Jewish community, and the umbrella organisation for over 200 Jewish organisations across Australia. It is the Australian affiliate of the World Jewish Congress, the worldwide umbrella organisation of Jewish communities. It is also affiliated with the Commonwealth Jewish Council, the Euro-Asian Jewish Congress, the Conference on Jewish Material Claims Against Germany, and the Memorial Foundation for Jewish Culture.

== History ==
Executive Council of Australian Jewry (ECAJ) was created in 1944 as the peak body for the various state-based representative bodies of Jews in Australia.

Syd Einfeld was president of the Executive Council of Australian Jewry between 1953 and 1954, 1957–58, and 1961–62. Other presidents to serve multiple terms are Maurice Ashkenasy (1948–1950, 1954–1956, 1958–1960, 1962–1964, 1966–1968) and Isi Leibler (1978–1980, 1982–1985, 1987–1989, 1992–1995).

== Description and governance ==
ECAJ is the umbrella organisation for over 200 Jewish organisations across Australia, and is the only organisation "that has a formal claim to representing the entire Australian Jewish community". It is composed of councillors who are appointed through constituent state peak bodies as well as national organisations affiliated to it, so it speaks for these organisations.

In their 2004 book Jews and Australian politics, Philip Mendes and Geoffrey Brahm Levey criticised the ECAJ as being not truly representative, writing their elections were too narrow to make a claim to represent all of Australia's Jews.

=== State peak bodies ===
Each state apart from Tasmania has a peak body that is a constituent of ECAJ:

- New South Wales: NSW Jewish Board of Deputies (NSWJBD)
- Victoria: Jewish Community Council of Victoria (JCCV)
- Western Australia: Jewish Community Council of WA (JCCWA)
- Queensland: Queensland Jewish Board of Deputies (QJBD)
- South Australia: Jewish Community Council of South Australia (JCCSA)

The NSWJBD and JCCV each has over 50 affiliated bodies, across the political and cultural spectrum. They are more focused on local issues than ECAJ, and tend to be more centrist.

=== People ===
As of October 2026, Daniel Aghion was president of ECAJ. Presidents of the state and territory organisations were:

- NSWJBD: Greg Joffe
- JCCV: Philip Zajac
- JCCSA: Annetay Henderson-Sapir
- JCCWA: Michael Levitt
- QJBD: Jason Steinberg
- ACT Jewish Community: Athol Morris
- Northern Territory Jewish Community Association: Vida Goodvach

=== Other affiliations ===
ECAJ is the Australian affiliate of the World Jewish Congress, the worldwide umbrella organisation of Jewish communities. It is also affiliated with the Commonwealth Jewish Council, the Euro-Asian Jewish Congress, the Conference on Jewish Material Claims Against Germany, and the Memorial Foundation for Jewish Culture.

== Platform and advocacy ==
The ECAJ Policy Platform has a strong focus on public policy, covering broad range of issues, including human rights, Indigenous issues, multiculturalism, interfaith relations, refugees, education, Holocaust remembrance, racial vilification, antisemitism, religious issues, and Israel and the international community. The federal government recognises ECAJ in an official capacity, and in 2024 awarded AU$25 million "to coordinate the security needs of the Jewish community across Australia".

According to Deborah Stone in a March 2024 article in The Jewish Independent, ECAJ is officially apolitical, with many progressive policies, such as support for a two-state solution and condemning religious rites that are discriminatory against gay people. It has always tended to lean right politically, particularly since Alex Ryvchin joined the previously longstanding CEO Peter Wertheim.

=== Communal submissions ===
One of the roles of ECAJ is to prepare submissions to the government on behalf of the Jewish community. It has made submissions on the statutory definition of charity, human rights, freedom of religion, and labelling Kosher foods.

ECAJ advocated for the return of Malka Leifer from Israel to face child abuse allegations, and issued an apology to abuse advocate Manny Waks, who was abused as a child.

In 2019, ECAJ called on the government to offer more protections to faith-based hospitals, aged care facilities, and housing providers, to allow organisations to continue to preference people of their own faith in service delivery.

=== Antisemitism ===
One of the roles of ECAJ is to monitor antisemitic instances in Australia. An ECAJ report said that there was an unprecedented 60% jump in incidents for 2018 on the back of an increase in 2017. This was seen mostly due to a sharp increase in white supremacist activity. Another ECAJ report said that there was a 30% increase in incidents in 2019.

=== Israel advocacy ===
According to the preliminary findings of the Gen 17 study of the Australian Jewish community published by Monash University's Australian Centre for Jewish Civilisation in 2018, 88% of Australian Jews feel a sense of responsibility to ensure that the State of Israel continues to exist in peace and security. ECAJ considers itself a peak body for Australian Jewry, and also regularly conducts advocacy on behalf of Israel. This is in accordance with the ECAJ's Constitution, whose objects include "To support and strengthen the connection of Australian Jewry with the State of Israel".

One significant area of pro-Israel advocacy is in their opposition to the Boycott, Divestment, and Sanctions (BDS) campaign against Israel. ECAJ has described the BDS movement as "anti-Israel" and "sometimes racist". It did not join the legal proceedings against a Sydney professor brought by the Israeli human rights group Shurat HaDin, who advocates boycotting Israeli academics.

ECAJ submitted a complaint to Special Broadcasting Service (SBS) over its screening of the TV series The Promise in November and December 2011. The complaint alleged that the series included many examples of the negative stereotyping of the Jewish people, in particular through the portrayals of the Jewish characters. The chairman of the New South Wales Community Relations Commission, Stepan Kerkyasharian wrote a letter to SBS alleging that the series stereotyped Israelis and asking it not to publish or distribute the programme.

In 2019 ECAJ lodged a complaint with the Australian Broadcasting Corporation(ABC) against an interview with the Israeli journalist and political candidate, Orly Noy, who claimed anti-Sephardi racism and Apartheid was deeply rooted in Israeli society.

In 2024, The Age reported that ECAJ deputy president Robert Goot had coordinated a campaign lobbying the Australian Broadcasting Corporation (ABC) to sack radio host Antoinette Lattouf, following social media posts by Lattouf relating to allegations of war crimes committed by Israel in the Gaza war. Lattouf subsequently sued the ABC for wrongful termination, with her statement of claim alleging that she had been sacked as a result of a campaign from ECAJ rather than in line with any ABC internal policies. In response, ECAJ's co-CEO Alexander Ryvchin stated that the council did not contact the ABC about Lattouf and the campaign was a "grassroots initiative of individuals exercising their right to make their objections known". Lattouf won the case against ABC.

ECAJ advocacy for Israel has included attacking the ACTU's statement criticising the deaths of Palestinian civilians by Israeli forces through bombings and forced starvation, condemning the International Criminal Court for its issuance of arrest warrants for Benjamin Netanyahu and Yoav Gallant for war crimes committed against Palestinians, and writing to Foreign Minister Penny Wong encouraging the denial of Palestinian statehood.
