= Rabbinical Council of Victoria =

The Rabbinical Council of Victoria is a body representing the state's Orthodox rabbis. It was established in 1967. Its primary goals are to provide professional development to its member rabbis, to enhance community participation among members of the Jewish community and to foster positive relations with leaders of other communities. They also have an oversight role of the Melbourne Beth Din.

They have had notable guests visit, including Chief Rabbi David Lau.

== Notable members ==
- Chaim Gutnick - founder of the council, and president until his death in 2003
- Yaakov Glasman
- Yitzchok Dovid Groner
- Mordechai Gutnick
- Sholem Gutnick
- Joseph Gutnick
