= Moshe Gutnick =

Australian Orthodox rabbi

Moshe D. Gutnick
- Born: Australia
- Education: Rabbinical College of Canada; Central Lubavitch Yeshiva Tomchei Tmimim
- Occupations: Orthodox rabbi, member of the Beth Din (rabbinical court) in Sydney, Australia, President of the Rabbinical Council of Australia and NZ.
- Years active: 1987–present
- Father: Rabbi Chaim Gutnick
- Family: Rabbi Mordechai Gutnick and Rabbi Joseph Gutnick (brothers)

Moshe D. Gutnick is an Australian Orthodox rabbi, and a member of the ultra Orthodox Chabad Hasidic movement. Rabbi Gutnick is a senior member of the Sydney Beth Din (rabbinical court) in Sydney, Australia. Gutnick is currently President of the Rabbinical Council of Australia and New Zealand. Gutnick is the head of the NSW Kashrut Authority. He formerly served as the rabbi of the Bondi Mizrachi Synagogue in Sydney.

== Early life ==
Gutnick was born in Australia. His father, born in Ukraine, was Rabbi Chaim Gutnick, a Holocaust survivor. Rabbi Mordechai Gutnick and Rabbi Joseph Gutnick are older brothers of his.

He was educated at the Yeshiva College and Yeshiva Gedolah in Melbourne, Australia. He continued his Rabbinic studies in New York and Montreal, and received semikhah (ordination as a rabbi) from both the Rabbinical College of Canada and the Central Lubavitch Yeshiva Tomchei Tmimim in New York. Gutnick also received Yoden Yoden (Yadin Yadin) (ordination as a Dayan (rabbinic judge)) from Talmudist Rav Pinchus Hirschprung as well as Rabbi Zelig Sharfstein.

== Sydney Beth Din ==
Gutnick serves as a senior member of the Sydney Beth Din, which he joined in 1993.

One of the roles of the Beth Din is Jewish divorces and solving gett refusal. Gutnick has been aggressive in his condemnation of the practice of gett refusal, and is a strong supporter of Halachic prenuptial agreements.

The Beth Din is also responsible for conversions. The Sydney Beth Din are one of the few in the world that is approved to perform conversions by the Israeli Chief Rabbinate.

Gutnick worked with the Halachic Organ Donor Society (HODS) in creating an Australian HODS card. The Sydney Beth Din deemed brain death, rather than cardio-respiratory failure, as halachic death. This allowed for a much higher success rate of organ transfer in the event of a transplant.

In 2018 Gutnick and three other members of the Rabbinic Council of Australia and New Zealand (RCANZ) were found in contempt of court and fined in NSW’s Supreme Court in Australia after pressuring a member of their community into approaching them to resolve a commercial business dispute in the Beth Din in accordance with Jewish law, instead of in the secular courts. At the time of the conviction, Gutnick was the president of RCANZ.

== NSW Kashrut Authority ==
Gutnick is the head of the NSW Kashrut Authority (KA), the most widely known kosher authority in New South Wales, which operates under the auspices of the Beth Din.

Gutnick criticized the Australian Jewish News in 2012 for printing advertising of non-kosher products, such as non-kosher challah to be used on Shabbat.

In 2014, a restaurant supervised by the KA purchased meat sourced from Melbourne when it was not able to purchase the same cut slaughtered locally. This was in breach of the restaurant's contract with the KA, under which only meat prepared under the supervision of the KA can be used. Gutnick had the offending meat confiscated.

The Kashrut Commission of Inquiry alleged in 2015 that the organisation lacked "transparency in relation to operations and finances", the community was not represented, and the meat suppliers were determined by factors outside of Jewish law, thus raising the prices of the meat to 30% more than in Melbourne.

In 2018, KA threatened to remove its certification from Our Big Kitchen if they allowed a caterer to use their kitchens to prepare food that KA had not certified as kosher. The caterer had moved to the KA's rival authority, Community Kashrut, for some of their certification. Gutnick declared food prepared under the rival authority to be non-kosher.

== Royal Commission into Institutional Responses to Child Sexual Abuse ==
Gutnick was called in early 2015 to testify before the Australian Royal Commission into Institutional Responses to Child Sexual Abuse. There he said, "I believe the cover-ups and bullying and intimidation that has gone on ... represents the antithesis of the teachings of Chabad and Judaism and orthodoxy." He acknowledged that the Orthodox Chabad community in Australia was guilty of covering up sex crimes committed in the community, and pressuring victims and their families not to report the crimes to the police. Gutnick said that people reporting abuse were ostracized mosers ("informers"). He said "a culture of cover-up, often couched in religious terms, pervaded our thinking and our actions." He said that rabbis in these situations had misused their power, and that anyone who insists a child sexual abuse victim should go first to a rabbi rather than the police is not doing so out of religious reasons but trying to "hush it up, to cover it up, to prevent the victim from finding redress. There is no doubt at all: Mesirah ['informing'] has no application whatsoever to instances of child sexual abuse. To use mesirah in this way is an abomination." Gutnick also lamented that there was no formal training for rabbis on how to handle reported abuse.

Manny Waks, an advocate for victims, said, "Today, Rabbi Moshe Gutnick restored my faith in ultra-Orthodox Judaism. For the first time ever the reform that is so critical seems much closer. Thank you Rabbi Gutnick. Hopefully the rest of the Orthodox Rabbinate will now follow suit. What an incredible day for justice."

Later, in 2017, Gutnick was a signatory of a proclamation outlining policies stating that all Chabad-Lubavitch institutions should immediately report all child abuse to the authorities.

== Dispute with Bondi Mizrachi Synagogue ==
Gutnick was the rabbi at the Bondi Mizrachi Synagogue in North Bondi from 1987 to 2009. After seeing their numbers fall, the synagogue tried a number of ways to change the situation. This included an ill-fated attempt to merge with the Great Synagogue.

The synagogue then decided to make Gutnick redundant, since his wages were becoming a financial burden on the synagogue. Gutnick argued that the board had no right to make this decision and that communal rabbis have life tenure. The only way to remove a rabbi, he contended, is via a Beth Din. He successfully obtained an interlocutory injunction in 2009 from the NSW Supreme Court, preventing his dismissal pending the ruling of a Beth Din "in accordance with Jewish law".

The case was taken to the London Beth Din. Gutnick emerged with a ruling in his favour, and a payout including costs of close to $1 million.

== Other activities ==
Gutnick wrote in defense of Rabbi Shmuley Boteach, who wrote Kosher Jesus in 2012, saying that while he agreed with some of what Boteach said and disagreed with other points: "The suggestion that [Boteach] is a heretic is simply ludicrous".

In 2016, Gutnick said Nelson Mandela "was truly one of the righteous of the nations. His greatness lay not in his physical strength or power but in his greatness of spirit."

Gutnick is a former president of the Rabbinical Council of NSW. He is a former head of the Organisation of Rabbis of Australasia (ORA). After ORA was closed down subsequent to several of its members were forced to resign because they were implicated in abuse by the Royal Commission into Child Sex Abuse and reformed as the Rabbinical Council of Australia and New Zealand, Gutnick was elected in 2018 to lead the new body.

Gutnick is opposed to same sex marriage, and has signed letters to parliament and written articles expressing his position. He said that while on the one hand he believes "there are great same-sex parents who will raise children wonderfully," he can’t support same sex marriage because the Biblical Jewish definition of marriage is between a man and a woman. He said: "a fundamental principle of my faith ... is that all human beings are created equal in the image of God and therefore have inalienable rights," and that accordingly he would always fight for LBGTQ rights, despite his position on marriage. He also believes that "There is no place for "homophobia" in authentic Judaism." He also defended rabbinic opposition to one aspect of the Safe Schools program, aimed at reducing bullying including bullying based on gender identity, by celebrating and teaching in the earliest stages of child education that homosexual behaviour is normative, saying "While bullying in any form is abhorrent, including the bullying of someone because of their sexual orientation, the solution is not to 'celebrate' an orientation that is against Torah teaching."

Gutnick has defended Halal certification against its detractors, saying that if that were to be said about kosher it would be considered anti-Semitic, and it was an attack on religious rights.

In April 2020, during the COVID-19 pandemic, synagogue services were suspended in Australia; Gutnick commented, "We're taking a very strong stance, stronger than the government's in terms of gatherings. We're better safe than sorry."

== See also ==
List of synagogues in Australia and New Zealand § New South Wales and Australian Capital Territory
