= Lieblein =

Lieblein is a surname, and may refer to:

- Franz Kaspar (Caspar) Lieblein (1744, Karlstadt am Main - 1810), German botanist
- Jens (Daniel Carolus) Lieblein (1827–1911), Norwegian Egyptologist and magazine editor
  - (Johan Nicolai) Severin Lieblein (1866, Kristiania - 1933), Norwegian writer; son of Jens

== See also ==
- Lieblein House, single-family house located at 525 Quincy Street in Hancock, Michigan
- Liebel (Liebl)
- Liebling (disambiguation)
- Liebler
- Lieblich (disambiguation)
