= Wran =

Wran or WRAN may refer to:

- Neville Wran, former Premier of New South Wales and former President of the Australian Labor Party
- Thomas Wran, English-born architectural sculptor in Sydney, Australia
- WRAN (FM), a radio station (97.3 FM) licensed to Taylorville, Illinois, United States
- WSVZ, a radio station (98.3 FM) licensed to Tower Hill, Illinois, United States that held the WRAN call sign from 1997 to 2014
- WRAN-LP, a defunct low-power radio station (100.1 FM) formerly licensed to Randolph, Vermont, United States
- IEEE 802.22, a standard for Wireless Regional Area Network (WRAN) using white spaces in the TV frequency spectrum
- Wren Day, an Irish and Manx tradition on St Stephen's Day

== See also ==
- Women's Royal Australian Naval Service (WRANS), a non-combat branch of the Royal Australian Navy that recruited women
