= Bertha Porush =

Jewish community leader (1903-2009)

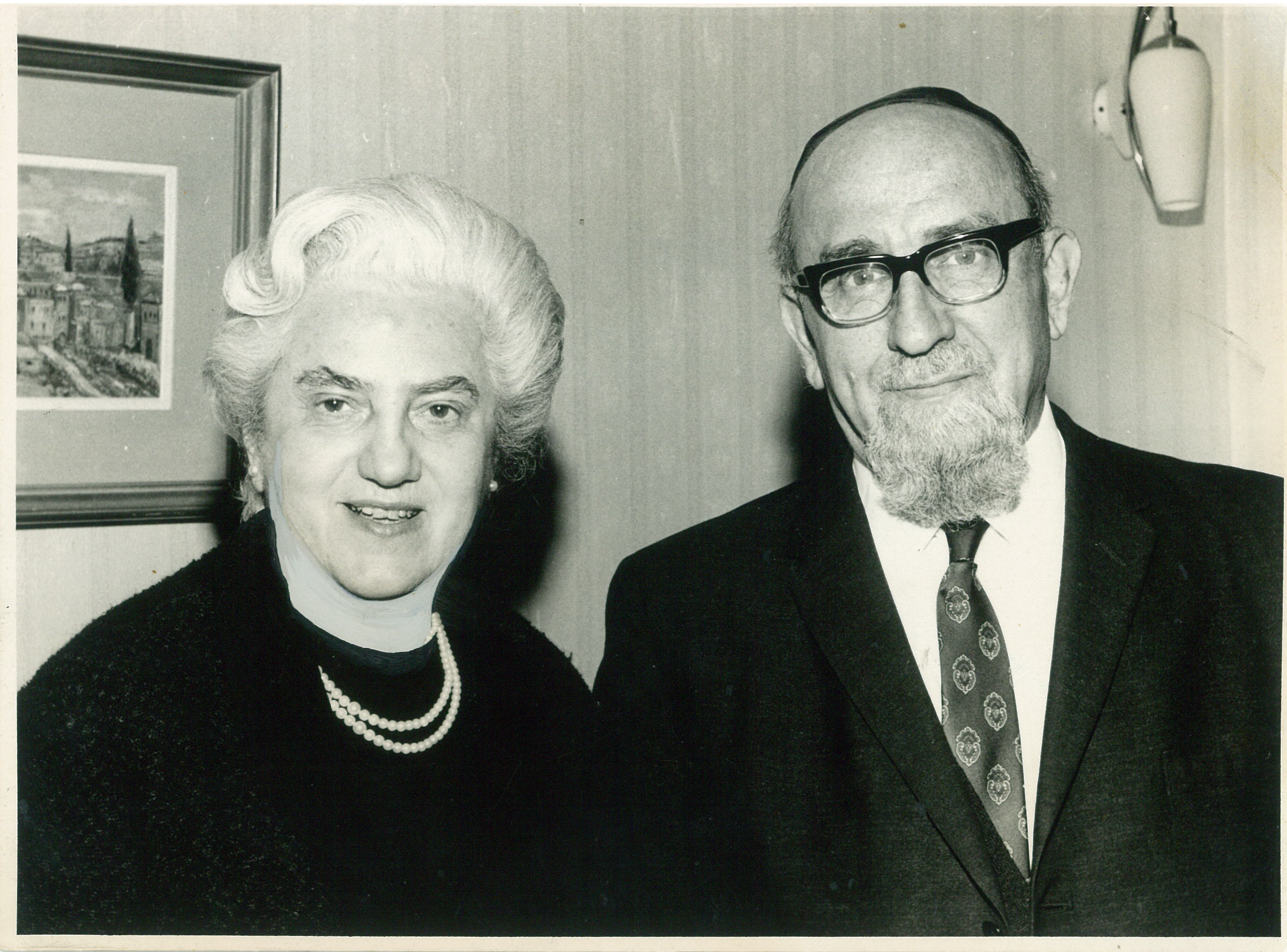
- Bertha Porush and her husband Rabbi Dr Israel Porush, c. 1970. Photo courtesy of The Great Synagogue Sydney.
- Born: 1903; Berlin
- Died: 2009 (aged 105–106); Jerusalem
- Other name: Bertha Link (maiden name)
- Known for: Jewish Women’s Leader

Bertha Porush (1903–2009) was a rebbetzin (rabbi's wife) in the Great Synagogue, Sydney. She was pivotal in the development of women's representation and service.

== Early life ==
Bertha Porush was born in Berlin in 1903. Her parents were Isidor and Mathilde Link.

== Influence ==
She moved to London in the 1930s where she met her husband Dr Rabbi Israel Porush. Israel Porush had been born in Jerusalem and educated in Germany. In 1940 they moved to Sydney because Israel was appointed Rabbi of the Great Synagogue, the oldest surviving synagogue in Sydney, Australia.

Porush served as a rebbetzin, or rabbi's wife, alongside her husband. Porush, as the rabbi's wife, held an important an influential role performing outreach, social tasks and being an intermediary for synagogue members who did not feel comfortable approaching the rabbi directly.

In 1941, Porush formed a women's auxiliary open to any female members, providing a forum for women's involvement in the management of the synagogue. Before this, only wives of the Chief Minister and board members were allowed to participate in decision making. The women's auxiliary drew together all the existing women's groups, women who had worked for the synagogue, and the Sacred Vestments Guild. Apple describes her as having “extraordinary foresight” and notes that her “influence on the women of the community was remarkable. In 1969, Porush was made a life member of the Women's Auxiliary.

Porush was president of the Education Auxiliary Board of the NSW Board of Jewish Education for 20 years. In this role she worked closely with the Women's Auxiliary, performing tasks such as raising funds and presenting prayer books to Barmitzvah boys and Batmitzvah girls. In the late 1950s, Porush proposed that there should be a Junior Auxiliary to train young married women for future leadership. This group was convened in May 1961.

== Death ==
In 1975, Porush and her husband moved to Caulfield, Melbourne. After his death in 1991, Porush moved with her daughter to Jerusalem, where she died aged 105.

== Family ==
Porush had two daughters, Judith (b.1935 d. 1969) and Naomi (b. 1937).
