= Leibler =

Leibler may refer to:

== People ==
- Richard Leibler (born 1914), American mathematician
- Ludwik Leibler (born 1951), French physicist
- Isi Leibler (1934–2021), Belgian-born Australian-Israeli Jewish leader
- Mark Leibler (born c. 1945), Australian lawyer and Jewish activist, brother of Isi
- Stanislas Leibler (born 1959), French-American physicist

== Other ==
- Kullback–Leibler divergence, a measure of information in probability theory
- Leibler Yavneh College, a Jewish day school in Melbourne, Australia

== See also ==
- Liebler, a surname
