= Great Synagogue (Sydney) =

19th-century synagogue in Sydney, Australia

The Great Synagogue
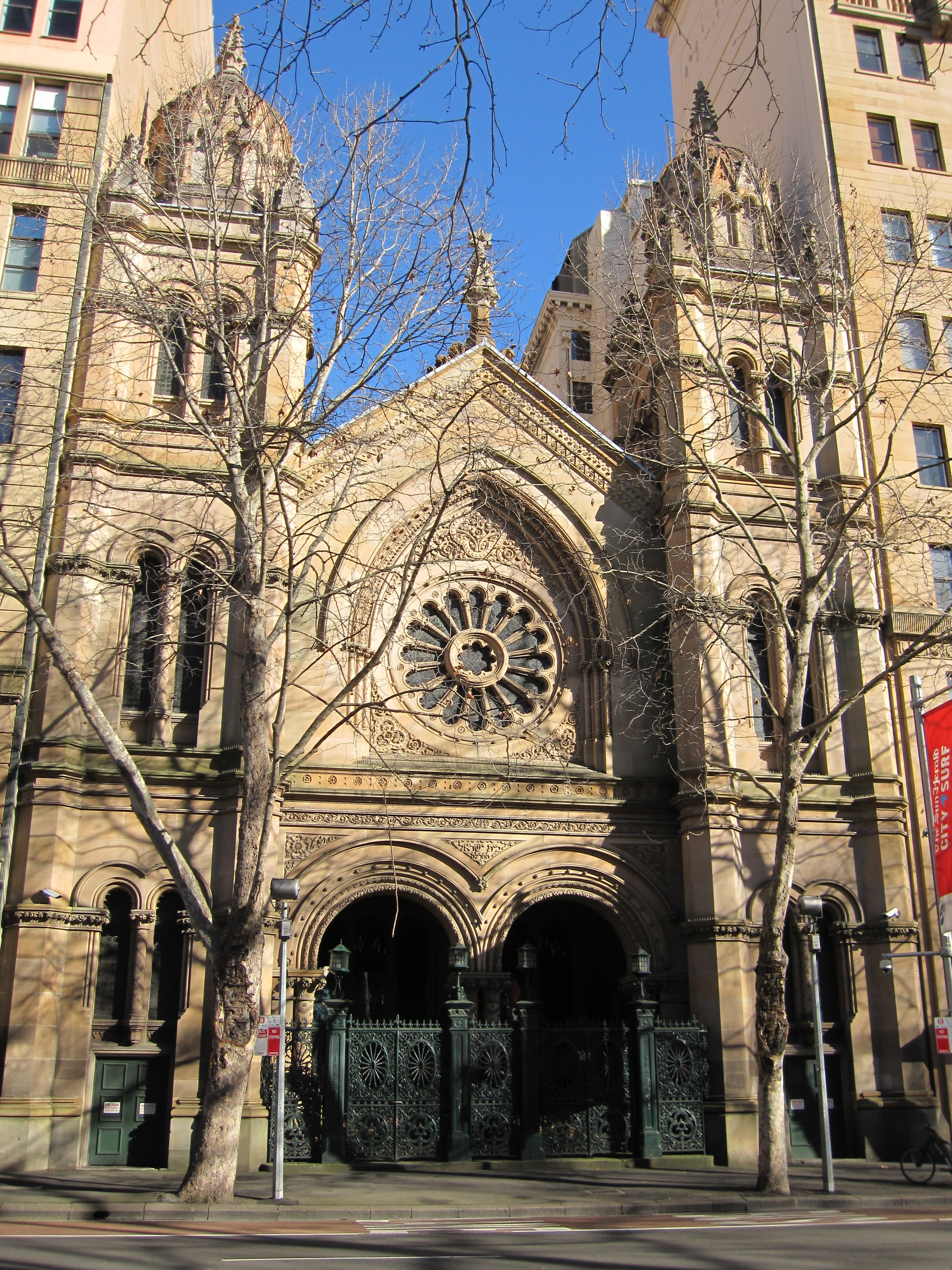
- The Great Synagogue facade and front entrance in Elizabeth Street

- Location in Sydney central business district

Religion
- Affiliation: Orthodox Judaism
- Ecclesiastical or organisational status: Synagogue
- Leadership: Rabbi Dr. Benjamin Elton (Chief Minister and Senior Rabbi); Rabbi Menachem Feldman (Chazzan and Assistant Rabbi)
- Year consecrated: 4 March 1878
- Status: Active

Location
- Location: 187a Elizabeth Street and 164-166 Castlereagh Street, Sydney CBD, New South Wales, Australia
- Coordinates: 33°52′22″S 151°12′34″E

Architecture
- Architects: Thomas Rowe; Walter Liberty Vernon (supervision); Thomas Wran (stone carvings)
- Type: Synagogue architecture
- Style: Victorian eclectic; Romanesque Revival; Gothic Revival; Moorish Revival
- Completed: 1878; 148 years ago
- Construction cost: over £23,000

Specifications
- Direction of façade: East
- Capacity: 1000
- Length: 43 metres (140 ft)
- Width: 20 metres (64 ft)
- Materials: Sandstone; brick; timber; slate
- New South Wales Heritage Register
- Official name: The Great Synagogue
- Type: State heritage (built)
- Criteria: a., b., c., d., e., f., g.
- Designated: 10 September 2004
- Reference no.: 1710
- Type: Synagogue
- Category: Religion
- Builders: Aaron Loveridge (stonework)

Website
- www.greatsynagogue.org.au

The Great Synagogue is an Orthodox Jewish congregation located in a large heritage-listed synagogue at 187a Elizabeth Street in the Sydney central business district in New South Wales, Australia.

The congregation is the oldest in the Sydney Jewish community, and comprises around 550 families. There are services every day of the week with the exception of Sunday. The service is Orthodox and traditional, with a professional choir singing on Shabbat and Festival mornings and at some evening services.

The synagogue provides pastoral care, adult education, a conversion class, activities for children and families and is the location for important Jewish communal services and events. Its Chief Minister is traditionally regarded as a primary representative of Judaism to the wider community.

Situated opposite Hyde Park, the synagogue building extends to Castlereagh Street. It was designed by Thomas Rowe and constructed between 1874 and 1878, with the stonework done by Aaron Loveridge and stone carving by Thomas Wran. The synagogue was added to the New South Wales State Heritage Register on 10 September 2004. The building is also listed on the (now defunct) Register of the National Estate.

== History ==
The Great Synagogue was built to unite two Jewish congregations in Sydney which worshipped at the time in synagogues in York Street and Macquarie Street. The York Street Synagogue had been designed in the Egyptian Revival style by James Hume and built in 1844. The first moves were made in 1864 towards obtaining a suitable site for a newer, larger synagogue.

In 1871 a meeting was held at York Street to discuss buying land available in Elizabeth Street. It was suggested a meeting be held with the Macquarie Street Synagogue to unite in purchasing the land for a synagogue to serve the whole community. John Solomon, a builder, purchased the land at auction for £2,000 in 1871 and held it until the congregation could raise sufficient funds. The proposal was for a synagogue and educational facilities. The money was to be raised by sale of land in Kent Street which had been granted for a Jewish school but never used. Further money was raised by the sale of the York and Macquarie Street properties. An appeal was also launched to fund the new building, accompanied by a photograph of the Central Synagogue in London (opening in 1870 and destroyed by bombing in 1941) which was intended to serve as the model for the Sydney building. Thomas Rowe, a Cornish architect based in Sydney, was selected in 1872 by means of a limited competition, the other competitors being George Allen Mansfield and Benjamin Backhouse; Rowe also acted as the construction manager for the new building. The design of the building also was partly based on the Princes Road Synagogue, Liverpool. The foundation stone was laid on 26 January 1875 by Saul Samuel, Postmaster General, the first Jewish minister of the Crown in the British Empire. A bazaar was held by the women of the congregation in Martin Place in December 1875 to raise extra funds.

The principal contractor for stonework was Aaron Loveridge, founder of the modern firm of Loveridge & Hudson. The contract drawings by Rowe, and signed by Loveridge, are held by Sydney's Mitchell Library. Other notable firms connected with the work were William Coleman (carpentry and joinery), Fletcher Brothers (decorative cast iron), Lewis and Steel (decorative plaster), Cornelius and Co of Philadelphia (gas fixtures), Minton Hollins & Co (tiles), P. N. Russell & Co (cast iron columns), and Lyon & Cottier (stained and etched glass).

The synagogue was consecrated on 4 March 1878, but its decoration was not completed until 1883. At the time of completion the synagogue was one of the first large Victorian buildings erected in Sydney.

The Great Synagogue possesses records of births, marriages and deaths which have taken place since the first entry was made on 1 November 1826. It also houses the AM Rosenblum Jewish Museum and the Falk Library, where weekday services take place.

The effort to preserve the history of old Jewish Sydney started in the late 20th century, ultimately leading to the foundation of the AM Rosenblum Jewish Museum in The Great Synagogue in May 1982. With it, Rodney Rosenblum AM (1934–2015), the former President of the Synagogue over several terms, honoured the memory of his parents and today, the collection of early Synagogue records and ceremonial objects documents an uninterrupted story of old Jewish Sydney's life.

In 1988 the Bicentennial Council of NSW recognised the importance of the building and recommended a significant grant for restoration work on the Elizabeth Street façade.

== Architecture ==
When the Great Synagogue was opened in March 1878, Its architectural style was inaccurately described in The Illustrated Sydney News as combining elements of Byzantine style and Gothic characteristics. Rather, the architect used the then popular Romanesque decorative elements with Gothic arches, adding a few subtle hints of Moorish décor inside the Synagogue.

The building, together with similar grand structures around the world, is often described as a "cathedral synagogue"; it has been called the cathedral synagogue of Australia.

The Great Synagogue consists of two main sections: the original synagogue (house of worship) with a ladies' gallery, at the Elizabeth Street end, and a five-storey addition at the Castlereagh Street end behind the facade of the original Beadle's residence. The Elizabeth Street frontage and towers are of Pyrmont stone, and the remainder of the early structure is brick with cast-iron columns and timber floors, and a slate roof. The Castlereagh Street façade is stone at ground floor level, with rendered brickwork above.

The interior is decorated with moulded plaster, carved timber and stained glass, all embellished with abstract patterns to avoid representation of living forms. Surviving timber stairs at the Elizabeth Street end have strongly carved balustrades. Walls are painted with gold leaf highlights, and the furniture is mostly of polished timber and brass. Some original colour schemes survive, notably on the ceiling of the Elizabeth Street porch, while the midnight blue ceiling with gold leaf stars has been repainted to the original design several times. Timber floors are raked at both ground and gallery levels, and the centre section of the ground floor and Ark steps, like the porch, are tiled in tessellated and mosaic work. The basement contains a hall which has steel portal frames supporting the columns and floor above, and also contains the AM Rosenblum Museum and Rabbi Falk Library. The contemporary addition, constructed of reinforced concrete, contains offices, classrooms & meeting rooms, together with a lift & fire stairs, and has a top floor with an openable roof. The mid 20th century stained glass windows in the Castlereagh Street façade were designed by Louis Kahan (1905–2002) of Melbourne. The building contains examples of venerable sacred scrolls and religious artefacts, including a menorah (nine-branched candelabrum) made by Rabbi L. A. Falk.

The present synagogue has the traditional feature of an elevated ladies' gallery. When first erected, the bimah was central, as is traditional. However, to increase seating capacity the bimah was moved forward to the western wall in 1906. Over the years, extensive additions and alterations have been made to the other facilities appurtenant to this building, including the construction of a succah, excavation and construction of a large reception area below the synagogue itself, construction of the Rabbi Falk Memorial Library, installation of electricity in the chandeliers, and installation of a shabbat elevator. A useful overview of the synagogue's history is provided by the 2008 book edited by Rabbi Raymond Apple.

=== Condition ===
As at 22 August 2001, the condition of the building is generally good, although the upper sections of stonework require maintenance (1997). There is unlikely to be much archaeological potential owing to the excavations for new sections of the building in the 1950s and 1980s.

The Great Synagogue is generally intact both externally and internally in the older section fronting Elizabeth Street.

=== Modifications and dates ===
- 1878 - Installation of cast iron gates made by the Fletcher Brothers foundry in Sydney.
- 1907 - Bimah moved from the centre to the west end of the synagogue and seats placed in the empty central area. Architects Kent & Budden.
- 1911 – choir gallery moved from east to west end, western semi-circular apse made square.
- 1910s – gasoliers converted to electric light. Little intrusion.
- 1940s – eastern wheel window strengthened internally with reinforced concrete. Some intrusion internally.
- 1957 – basement deepened and reconstructed as War Memorial Hall. Architect Orwell Phillips. Some intrusion, although the previous basement area appears to have been of little significance.
- 1981 – western section rebuilt behind original facade as Education Centre. Architects Orwell Phillips and David Nathan. Some intrusion mostly in less significant areas, except for the replacement of original timber stairs with concrete fire stairs.
- 1987 – stonework conserved and interiors decorated with stencilling, some based on early patterns found. Sprinkler system installed. Minimal intrusion.
- 2021 – Glass security screens added at the entrance of the portico on Elizabeth Street.
- 2023 – Restoration by Scobie Mcintosh of the heritage cast iron gates on Elizabeth Street.
- 2023 – Removal of the central pews on the ground floor of the Synagogue in preparation for the Bimah repositioning.
- 2024 – The Synagogue ground floor layout was restored to its original 1878 design.

=== Further information ===
One of the State significant items used at the launch of the State Heritage Inventory.

- June 2006: more than $310,000 approved to assist works to the interior - The project includes: restoration works to the interior of the building, reintroduction of natural ventilation, and conservation work to the suspended and wall-mounted gasoliers.

== Incidents ==
- 1888 chalking incident In 1888, a Sydney resident who appeared to regularly disfigure public buildings using chalk targeted the Great Synagogue. The specific nature of the chalking was not reported.
- 1947 bomb threat – In 1947, the Great Synagogue was targeted with bomb threats.
- 1960 bomb threats – In 1960, the Great Synagogue was targeted with multiple bomb threats.
- 1961 bomb threat – In 1961, the Great Synagogue was targeted with bomb threats.
- 1963 vandalism incident – In 1963, the Great Synagogue was targeted with Nazi-themed stickers during a spate of swastika daubings in Sydney.
- 1977 arson attack – In 1977, the Great Synagogue in Sydney was targeted in an arson attack which damaged the synagogue doors. It was believed to be the first such incident to take place in New South Wales. Several days before the attack, obscene literature was placed inside the synagogue.
- 1978 vandalism incidents – In 1978, the Great Synagogue was vandalized with pro-Palestinian graffiti, and in another incident, with swastikas.
- 2001 criticism of antisemitism response - In 2001, Rabbi Apple of the Great Synagogue criticised Christian and Muslim leaders for their silence over a recent wave of antisemitic incidents.
- 2024 protest incident – In 2024, pro-Palestinian protests occurred around the Great Synagogue that prompted NSW Government to propose hate‑crime laws protecting places of worship.

== People ==
Reverend Alexander Bernard Davis (1828–1913) was the Chief Minister of the York Street Synagogue beginning in 1862 and became the first Chief Minister of The Great Synagogue in 1878, a position he held until his retirement in 1903. He was assisted by the Second Minister of the congregation, Reverend Aaron Alexander Levi (1823–1883), who had previously led the York Street Synagogue in 1860–61, following the resignation of Rev Morrice Robertson Cohen. On 28 February 1878, the Board of Management invited both Rev Alexander B. Davis and Rev Aaron Alexander Levi to continue their services at the newly built Great Synagogue. Rev Aaron Alexander Levi served at The Great Synagogue from its inception in 1878 until his untimely death in 1883.

In 1905 Rabbi Francis Lyon Cohen was appointed Rabbi of The Great Synagogue and charged with establishing a Beth Din in Sydney, which still exists today. From 1909 he was assisted by Rev Marcus Einfeld as Cantor and from 1922 by Rev (later Rabbi) LA Falk as Second Rabbi. Rabbi Falk served until his death in 1957, leaving an important library.

Cohen died in office in 1934 and was succeeded briefly by Rabbi Ephraim Moses Levy from 1935 to 1938, who came from the Durban United Hebrew Congregation. Rabbi Dr. Israel Porush was appointed Rabbi in 1940. Porush was born in Jerusalem, and educated in there and in Germany. He was living in London when he met his wife Bertha Link. Porush became the most senior rabbi in Australia and retired in 1972.

From 1973 to 2005 Rabbi Raymond Apple led the congregation and made several changes to the synagogue, including introducing the priestly blessing on festivals, instituting a male choir and enabling the first individual bat mitzvah on a Shabbat morning.

The cantor from 1964 to 1989 was Rev Isidor Gluck, who guided the service towards a less English and more Eastern European style, while maintaining its cantorial and choral nature.

Rabbi Jeremy Lawrence was rabbi from 2005 to 2014 and was very involved with interfaith work. In 2015 he was succeeded by the present Chief Minister, Rabbi Dr Benjamin Elton. Rabbi Elton is also the Orthodox Rabbinic Consultant to the Executive Council of Australian Jewry and the New South Wales Jewish Board of Deputies.

Presidents of The Great Synagogue have included George Myers, George Judah Cohen, Israel Green OBE, Sidney Sinclair AM OBE Life President, David Newman, Rosalind Fischl OAM, Rodney Rosenblum AM, Stephen Rothman AM, and currently David Lewis.

== Gallery ==
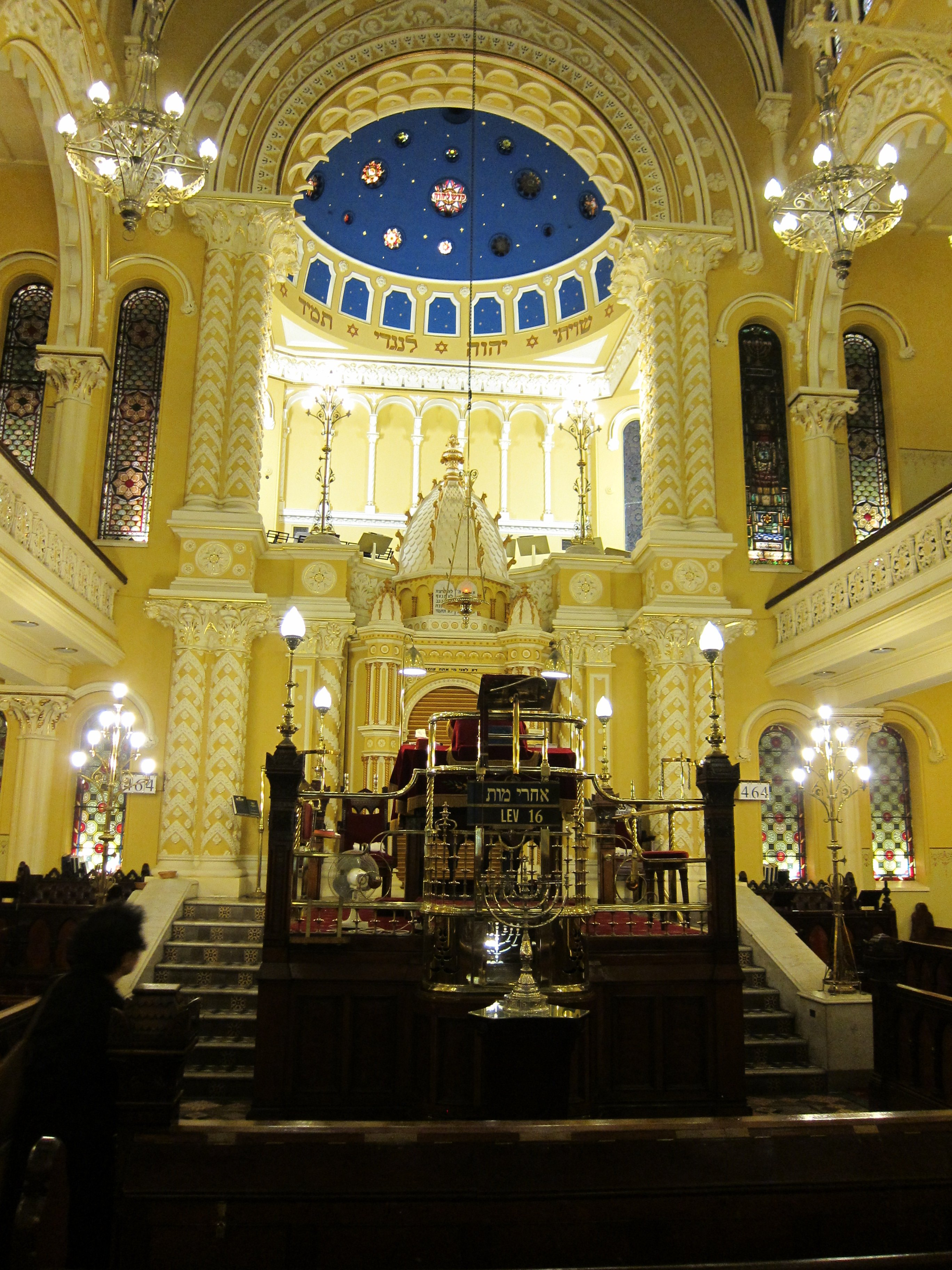
Bimah of The Great Synagogue, 1907–2024

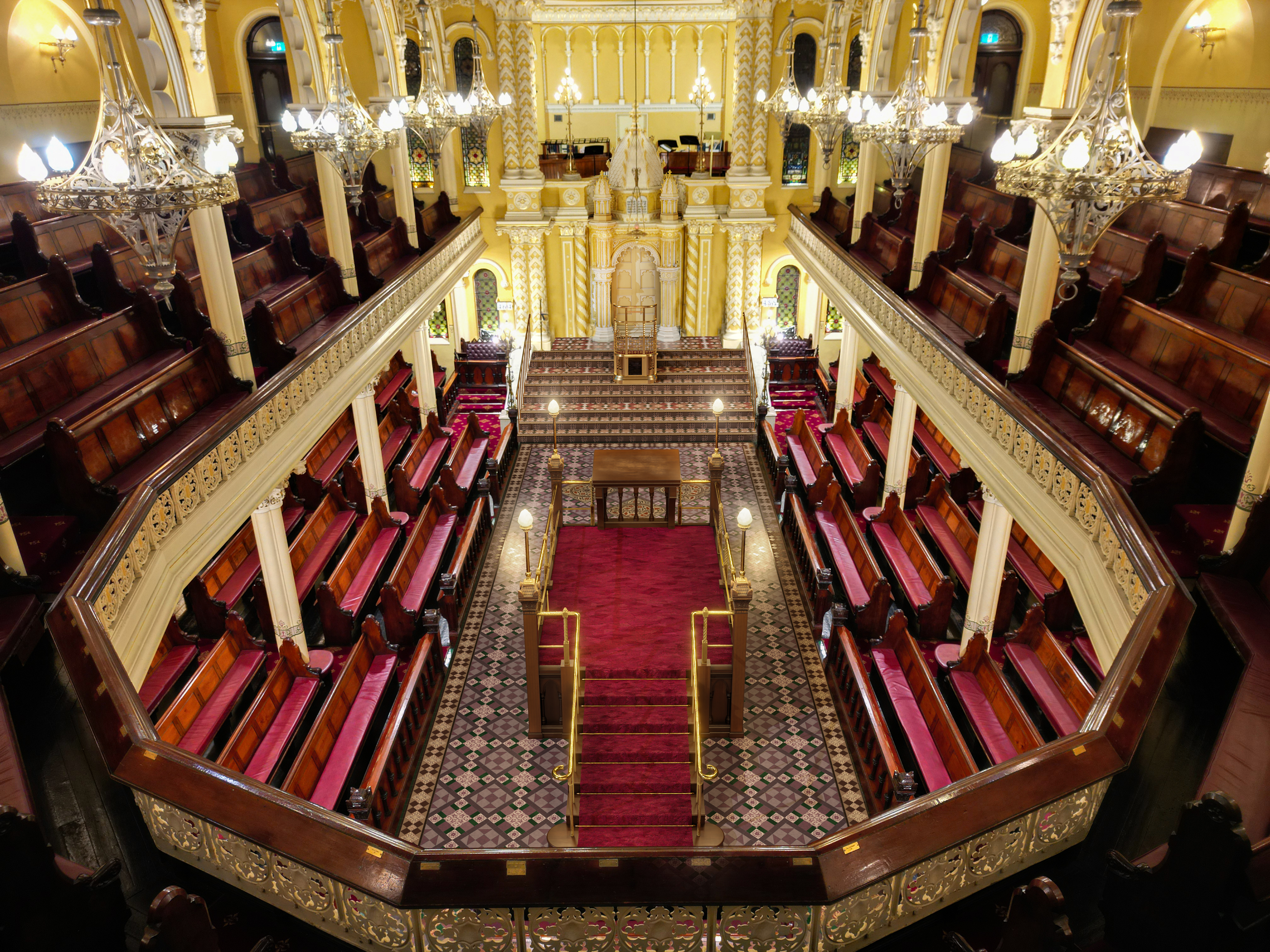
Bimah and Ark 3D viusualisation by Zac Levi - 2024

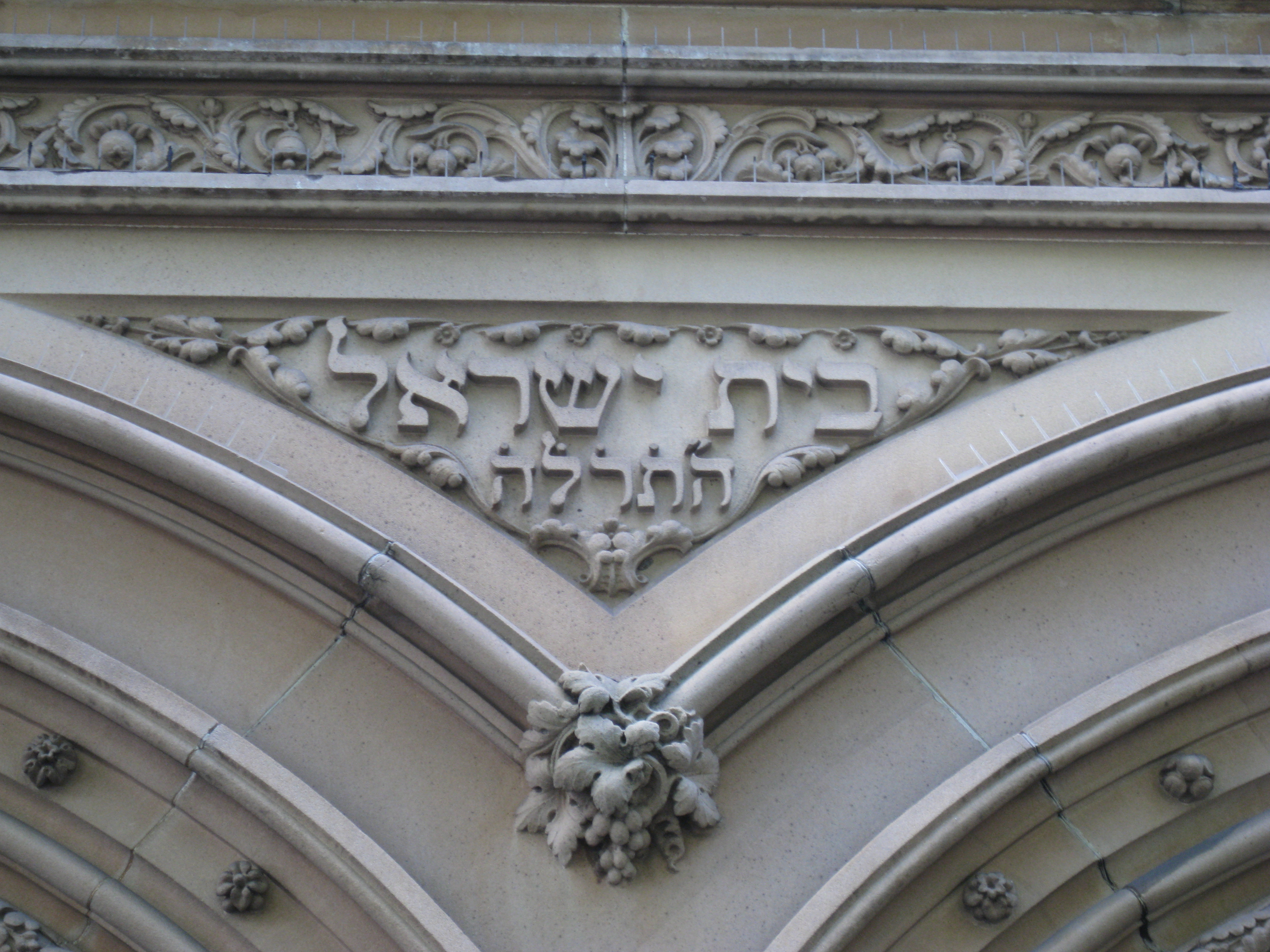
Architectural detail. This inscription reads Beth Israel (House of Israel)

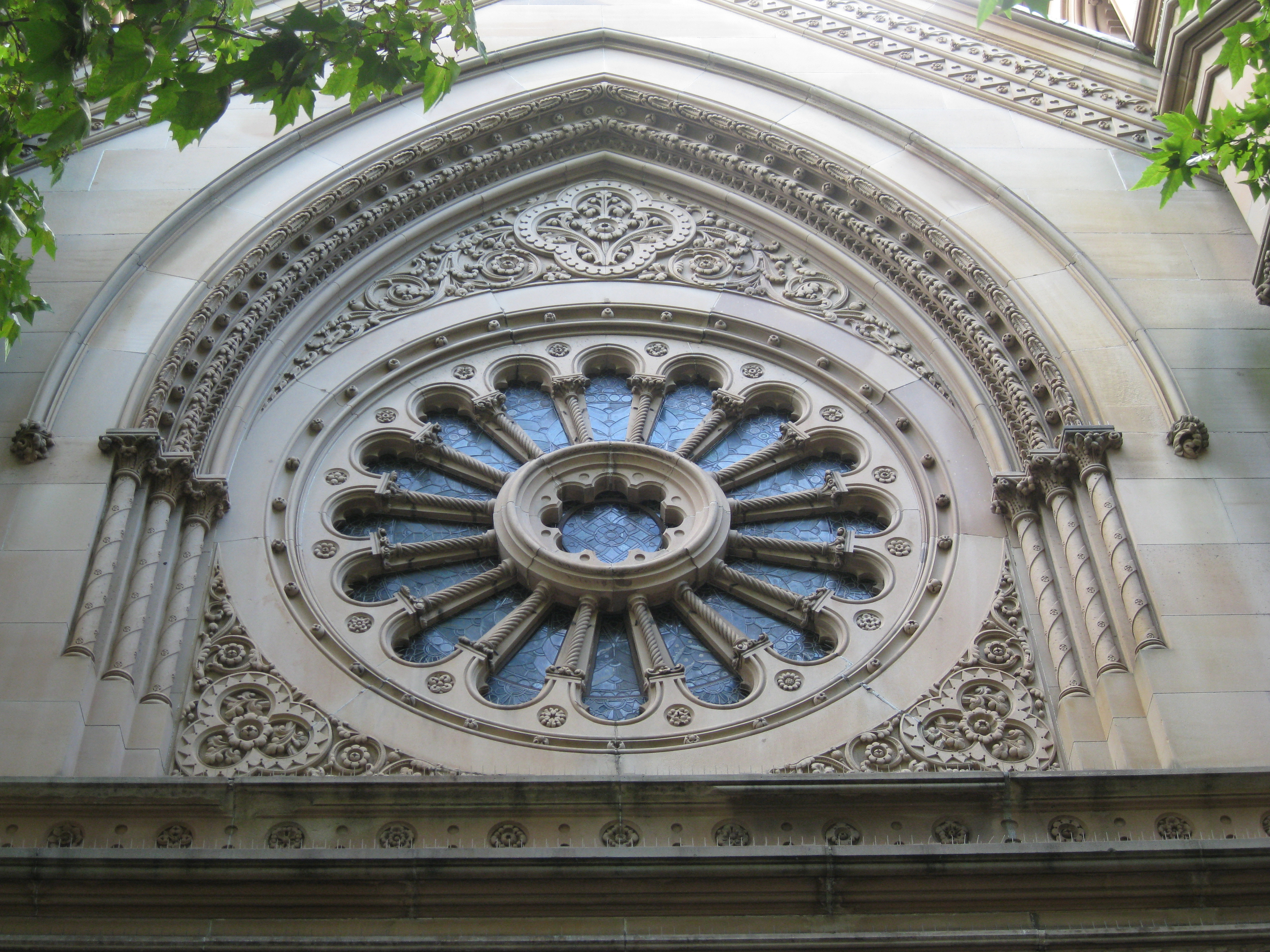
Elizabeth Street wheeled window. Reinforced concrete spokes were added to the inside of this window during World War II for protection against blast damage.

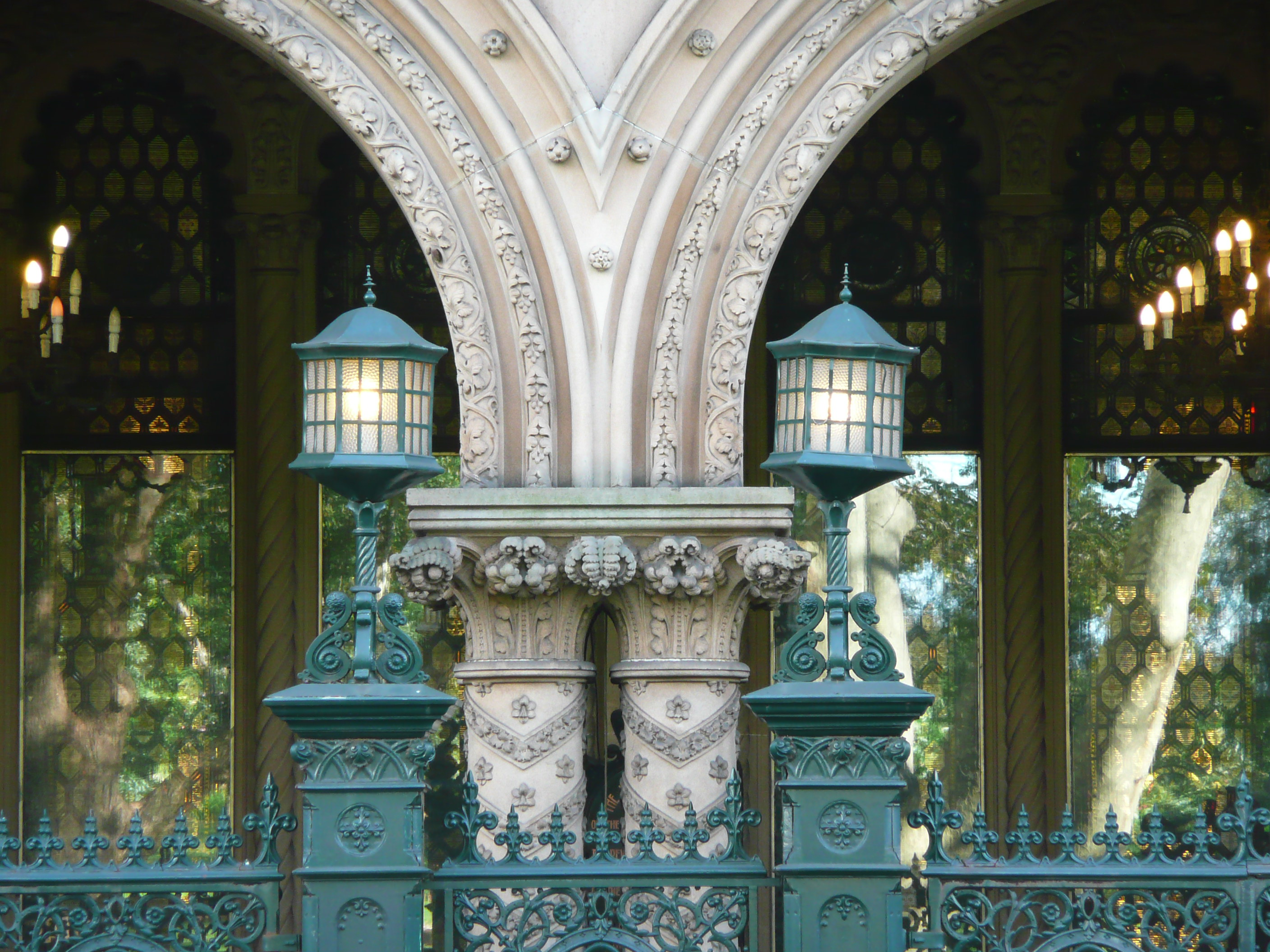
Detail of entrance

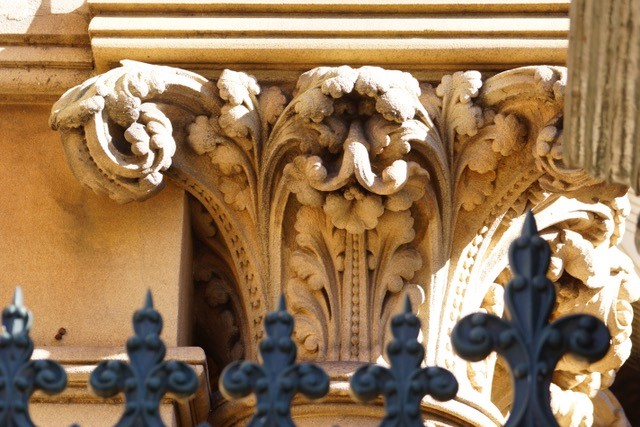
Porch capital, Elizabeth Street by Thomas Wran

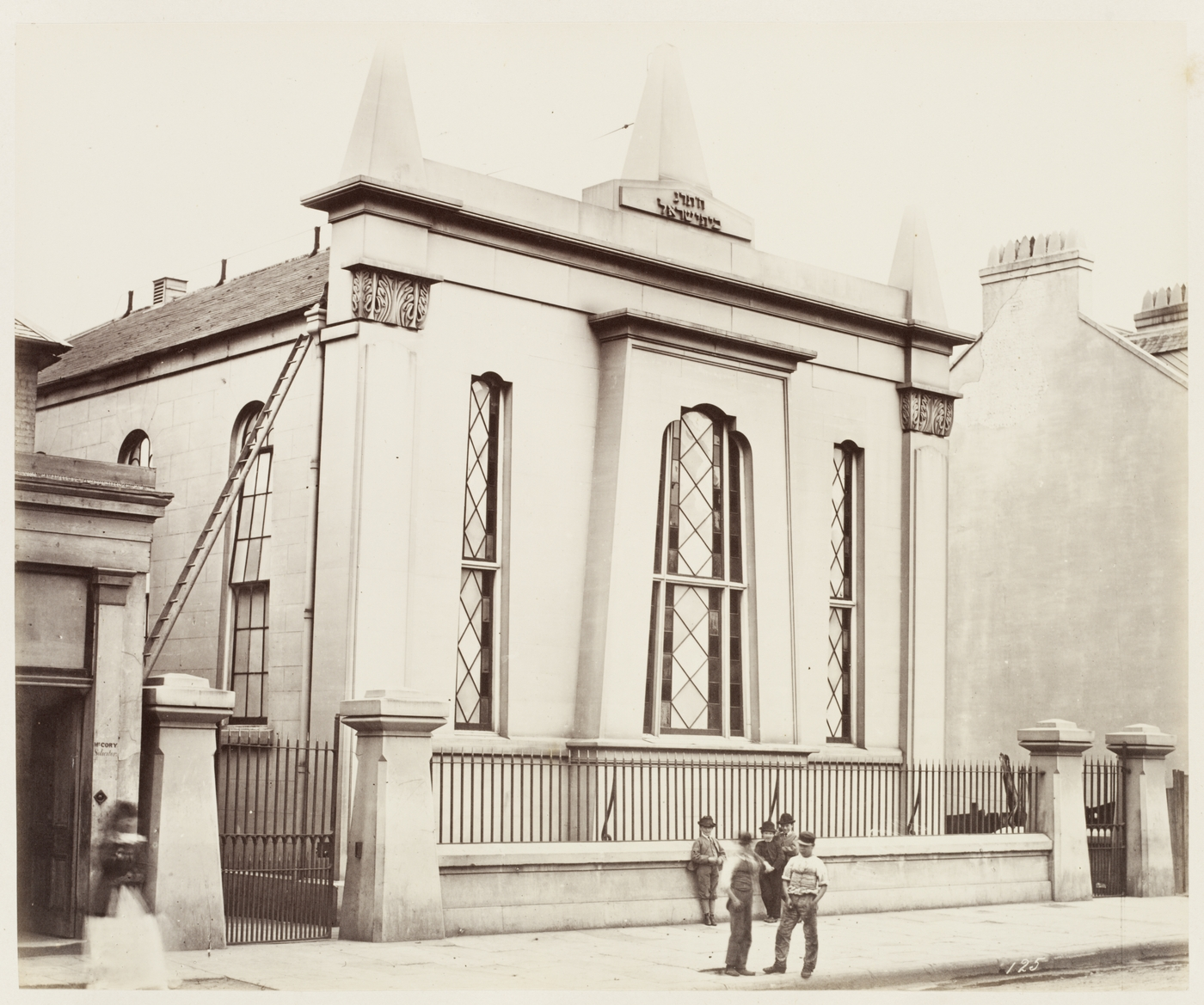
The 1844 York Street Synagogue in Sydney - very similar Egyptian style to Hobart Synagogue and Launceston Synagogue

== See also ==
- History of the Jews in Australia
- List of synagogues in Sydney
  - Central Synagogue (Sydney)
  - Emanuel Synagogue (Sydney)
  - North Shore Synagogue
  - Southern Sydney Synagogue
