= Raymond Apple =

Raymond Apple may refer to:

- R. W. Apple Jr. (1934–2006), associate editor of The New York Times
- Raymond Apple (rabbi) (1935–2024), Australian orthodox rabbi
