= Liebling =

Liebling (German for "darling") may refer to:

== Music ==
- Liebling (album), a 1999 album by Andreas Johnson
- Lieblings, a 2025 extended play by Takane Lui

== People ==
- A. J. Liebling, an American journalist for The New Yorker
- Alison Liebling (born 1963), British criminologist and academic
- Beth Liebling, bassist and drummer for the instrumental group Hovercraft
- Bobby Liebling, an American singer of the heavy metal band Pentagram
- Debbie Liebling, president of production for 20th Century Fox Atomic
- Estelle Liebling, an operatic soprano, voice teacher, and vocal coach
- Helen Liebling, a British Clinical Psychologist and academic
- Jerome Liebling, an American photographer and filmmaker
- Jonathan Liebling, a British Medicinal Cannabis Expert and Campaigner
- Leonard Liebling, an American music critic, concert pianist, composer, librettist, and long time editor-in-chief of the Musical Courier
- Leonard Irving Liebling, a British Consultant Psychiatrist and a Founder of The Royal College of Psychiatry in 1972
- Max Liebling, a German born American concert pianist, composer, conductor, and music teacher
- Mordechai Liebling, a rabbi and former director of the Jewish Reconstructionist Federation
- Roman Polanski (né Liebling) French-Polish filmmaker and fugitive
- Tina Liebling, a politician and attorney from the U.S. state of Minnesota

== Places ==
- Liebling, Timiș, a commune in Romania
