= Liebler =

Liebler is a surname. Notable people with the surname include:

- M.L. Liebler (born 1953), American author and editor
- Scott Liebler (1959–1989), American racing driver

== See also ==
- Leibler (disambiguation)
