= Isi Leibler =

Jewish activist (1934–2021)

Isi Leibler AO CBE
- איזי ליבלר
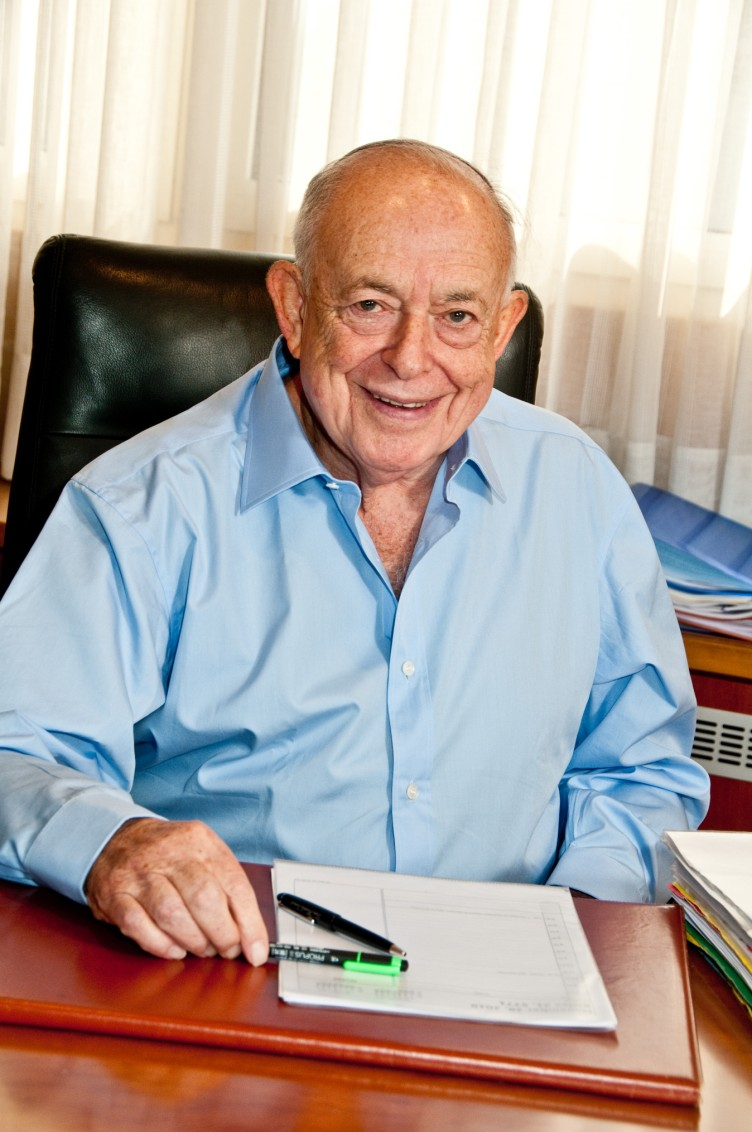
- Isi Leibler, 2011
- Born: 9 October 1934; Antwerp, Belgium
- Died: 13 April 2021 (aged 86); Israel

Isi Leibler AO CBE (Hebrew: איזי ליבלר; 9 October 1934 – 13 April 2021) was a Belgian-born Australian-Israeli international Jewish activist.

== Biography ==
Born in Antwerp, Belgium, Leibler was brought to Australia by his parents as an infant just before the outbreak of World War II. Leibler served as president of the Executive Council of Australian Jewry and Chairman of the Governing Board of the World Jewish Congress. He was a leader in the global campaign on behalf of Soviet Jewry and played a role in the lead-up to Israeli diplomatic relations between India and China.

Leibler and his wife moved to Israel in 1999, settling in Jerusalem. He wrote weekly columns in the Jerusalem Post, the Hebrew daily Israel Hayom, and on his blog Candidly Speaking from Jerusalem.

Leibler married Naomi Porush (daughter of Rabbi Dr Israel Porush) in 1958, and the couple had three sons and a daughter. All of his children and most of their families also live in Israel.

== Australian Jewry ==
Described in the new edition of Encyclopaedia Judaica as “unquestionably the dominant Jewish lay leader in Australia during the previous quarter century”, Leibler occupied the leadership of the Australian Jewish community (Executive Council of Australian Jewry) from 1978 and served four terms in this office, retiring in 1995.

== Soviet Jewry ==
Leibler's involvement in the fight for Soviet Jewry was first solicited by Shaul Avigur, the head of Nativ (the then-covert agency dealing with Soviet Jews) who played an enormous role behind the scenes in the formulation of policy during the early years of the state. In 1962, Mr. Leibler engineered a public campaign which resulted in Australia becoming the first country in the world to raise the plight of Soviet Jewry at the United Nations. In 1965, he published Soviet Jewry and Human Rights.

Before the collapse of the Communist bloc, Leibler made numerous visits to the Soviet Union and developed close associations with the leading Jewish dissidents and refuseniks, which he still maintained in Israel. The visits came to an end in 1980 with his arrest and expulsion from the Soviet Union.

When Mikhail Gorbachev liberalised the system, Leibler became the first international Jewish leader to be invited to the Soviet Union to evaluate the changes. He subsequently launched the first Jewish cultural centre in the Soviet Union – the Solomon Mykhoels Centre in Moscow, together with the first Hebrew Song Festivals in Moscow and Leningrad.

Leibler's activities and campaign on behalf of Soviet Jewry are documented in the book: Let my People Go: The untold story of Australia and Soviet Jews 1969 – 1989, authored by Sam Lipski and Suzanne Rutland in 2015.

== Asia Pacific ==
Following the liberation of Soviet Jewry, Leibler focused his attention on the Asia-Pacific region. He met with Indian Prime Minister Narasimha Rao and Chinese Foreign Minister Qian Qichen ahead of the establishment of diplomatic relations between Israel and both countries. Leibler also convened a colloquium for leading Jewish and Chinese scholars in Beijing prior to diplomatic relations being instituted between Israel and China.

== World Jewish Congress ==
Leibler occupied senior roles in the World Jewish Congress (WJC), an umbrella organisation representing global Jewry, including Chairman of the Governing Board and Senior Vice President.

== Controversy ==
In 2004, Leibler confronted the leadership of the WJC over the issue of governance, financial transparency, and financial irregularities. The conflict between Leibler and WJC Chairman Israel Singer revolved around the former's demand for an investigation into the transfer of $1.2 million from the organization's New York headquarters to a bank account in Geneva, and the subsequent transfer of the money by Singer into a trust account held by his friend. Leibler's calls for a comprehensive independent audit" brought him into conflict with Singer and Edgar Bronfman, the WJC's longtime "president, chief benefactor, and guiding force."

In January 2005, Leibler resigned as WJC vice president, telling Haaretz that he "came to the conclusion that I cannot remain in an organization that requires me to give a stamp of approval to activities I deem inappropriate. Elan Steinberg also left the WJC amidst the controversy, while two other top officials were fired. Leibler wrote that his position had been "vindicated" but expressed "deep sadness" at the organization's disarray.

In 2004, the New York State Attorney General's Office began an investigation into the WJC. The AG's Office issued a report in 2006 that found "serious financial mismanagement" at WJC, including improper payments and loans to Singer. Under an agreement between the Attorney General's Office and WJC, Singer was barred from the organization's leadership roles and returned several loans and payments, and the WJC undertook reforms. The WJC subsequently filed a $6 million defamation suit against Leibler in the Israeli courts but withdrew the action less than six months later, and were ordered by the court to pay Leibler's legal expenses. A PricewaterhouseCoopers audit in 2006 submitted by the WJC to the AG's Office found that the financial scandal was "significantly broader than has been publicly known," with some $3 million unaccounted for from 1994 to 2004. Leibler, described by the Jewish Daily Forward as the "most persistent critic" of the WJC, said that these findings were not surprising.

Leibler was accused of de-legitimizing liberal Jewish supporters of Israel. Leibler responded that "I stand by my view that those whose primary goal is to delegitimize and demonize the Jewish state should be marginalized from the mainstream Jewish community. That is not fascism. It is common sense.

Leibler called for a full external investigation and disclosure of massive misappropriations of funds at the Conference on Jewish Material Claims Against Germany (Claims Conference), citing allegations of incompetence, impropriety and cover-ups, the absence of an independent review board, bureaucratization and a domination by a small clique, along with a failure to "prioritize the needs of survivors, who are now elderly and many of whom are living in dire poverty. In response Claims Conference Julius Berman has accused Leibler of engaging "in irresponsible invective and baseless charges against an organization that for nearly 60 years has been the leading international advocate for the rights of Holocaust victims."

In 2021, a biography on Leibler revealed that he had been operating in Australia as an Israeli intelligence asset from 1959. The biography detailed how he “acted unofficially under instructions from Avigur and Levanon, becoming a de facto operative for Israel on foreign affairs”

== Publications and writings ==
Leibler was a columnist for The Jerusalem Post. He was also a regular columnist for Israel Hayom, the Israeli daily newspaper.

Leibler wrote on the dangers of religious extremism, in particular radical religious nationalism.

Leibler was the author of The Israel-Diaspora Identity Crisis: A Looming Disaster.

He chaired the Israel Diaspora Committee of the Jerusalem Center for Public Affairs, an Israeli think tank.

Leibler also published a study on the threat post-Zionism poses to the soul of Israel, titled Is the Dream Ending?

== Business ==
In Australia, Leibler's company, Jetset Tours, was the largest travel organization in the region with branches throughout the world. He was also a director of one of Australia's three national television companies. In Israel, he had invested and acted as a consultant to a number of high tech companies.

== Awards ==
Leibler was appointed a CBE (Commander of the Order of the British Empire) in 1977, an AO (Officer of the Order of Australia) in 1989 and an honorary Doctor of Letters from Deakin University in 1990. In 2015, Leibler was awarded an honorary doctorate from Bar-Ilan University in recognition of “his tireless efforts to address the challenges facing the Jewish nation at every historic crossroad”.
