= Raymond Apple (rabbi) =

Australian-Israeli rabbi (1935–2024)

Rabbi Raymond Apple בצלאל אפל AO RFD
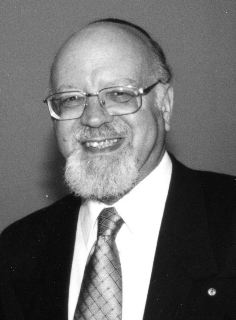

Personal life
- Born: 27 December 1935 Melbourne, Victoria, Australia
- Died: 19 January 2024 (aged 88) Jerusalem, Israel
- Website: www.oztorah.com

Religious life
- Religion: Judaism
- Denomination: Orthodox
- Profession: Rabbi

Jewish leader
- Predecessor: Rabbi Dr Israel Porush
- Successor: Rabbi Jeremy Lawrence
- Position: Senior Rabbi
- Synagogue: Great Synagogue (Sydney)
- Residence: Israel
- Semikhah: London School of Jewish Studies

Raymond Apple AO RFD (Hebrew: בצלאל אפל; 27 December 1935 – 19 January 2024) was an Australian and Israeli rabbi who worked in England and Australia and retired to Israel. He was the Senior Rabbi of The Great Synagogue of Sydney between 1972 and 2005. In this role, he was one of Australia's highest profile rabbis and the leading spokesman for Judaism in Australia.

== Early life ==
Born in Melbourne, Apple was educated at the selective Melbourne High School. He was influenced by Rabbi Jacob Danglow and his teacher Dr Samuel Billigheimer (1889–1983). He continued his education at the University of Melbourne, where he graduated Bachelor of Arts and Bachelor of Laws, then at the University of New England in Australia, gaining a Master of Literature degree, and finally at Jews' College (now called the London School of Jewish Studies), where he received a teaching diploma and semikhah (rabbinic diploma).

Apple received a Doctor of Laws (LL.D.) honoris causa from the University of New South Wales and Doctor of the University (D.Univ.) from the Australian Catholic University. He was also an Honorary Fellow of the University of Sydney and recipient of the Distinguished Alumni award of the University of New England.

== Religious leadership ==
Between 1960 and 1972, Apple served London congregations at Bayswater and Hampstead before returning to Australia to take up the role of senior rabbi at The Great Synagogue in Sydney.

In Sydney he also served as a dayan (rabbinic judge) and registrar for the Sydney Beth Din.

Interfaith dialogue was a lifetime interest of Apple and one which he pursued in Australia. He was a patron and a former joint president and chairman of the Australian Council of Christians and Jews and also a life member and former chairman of the New South Wales Council. He founded the Christian-Jewish Luncheon Club in Sydney, and was a leader of dialogue with Islam.

== Other roles ==
Apple was an Australian Army Reserve chaplain for fifteen years, and in 1988–2006 senior rabbi to the Australian Defence Force. He also served, for two terms, as chairman of the Religious Advisory Committee to the Services, the first Jewish representative to hold this office. He was awarded the Reserve Force Decoration (RFD) and the Australian Defence Medal. He was also a chaplain to the NSW Police.

Apple was prominent in Freemasonry, being a Past Deputy Grand Master, Past Junior Grand Warden, and Past Grand Chaplain of the United Grand Lodge of New South Wales and the Australian Capital Territory.

== Retirement ==
Apple retired from his Sydney position in 2005, made aliyah in 2006 with his wife Marian Apple (née Unterman), and lived in Israel until his death.

While based in Jerusalem, Apple served as president of the Israel Regional section of the Rabbinical Council of America between 2016 and 2018.

Apple died in Jerusalem on 19 January 2024, at the age of 88. He was survived by Marian, his wife of 63 years, children Shmuel, Riva, Adina and Benseon, 20 grandchildren and 27 great-grandchildren.

== Honours ==
Apple was appointed an Officer of the Order of Australia (AO) in the 2004 Birthday Honours, for "service to the community through promoting inter-faith dialogue and harmony, to raising awareness of social justice, ethical and spiritual issues, and to the Jewish community." He has also received the Queen Elizabeth II Silver Jubilee Medal and the Centenary of Federation Medal.

Apple received the honorary degrees of Doctor of Laws from the University of New South Wales and Doctor of the University from the Australian Catholic University (2016). He was also an Honorary Fellow of the University of Sydney and received a Distinguished Alumni award from the University of New England.

== Selected publications ==
Apple wrote a number of books, including:

- Biblical people. Sydney and Bloomington: Mandelbaum House and AuthorHouse. 2021. pp. 168 p. ISBN 9781665592529.
- New Testament People: A Rabbi's Notes. Bloomington: AuthorHouse. 2016. pp. 236 p. ISBN 978-1-52462-994-6.
- Enemies and Obsessions: More Memories and Musings. Bloomington: AuthorHouse. 2014. pp. 138 p. ISBN 978-1-49699-223-9.
- Eighty Days and Eighty Nights: Wise Words for Everyday. Bloomington: iUniverse. 2012. pp. 64 p. ISBN 978-1-47594-654-3.
- Education by Degrees: Masonic Notes. Bloomington: AuthorHouse. 2012. pp. 86 p. ISBN 978-1-4772-2334-5.
- Let's Ask the Rabbi. London: AuthorHouse. 2011. pp. 316 p. ISBN 978-1-4567-7269-7.
- Freemasonry: Studies, Speeches and Sensibilities. Sydney: The Museum of Freemasonry. 2010. pp. 181 p. ISBN 978-0-9807584-0-5.
- Episodes and Eccentrics: More tales of The Great Synagogue. Sydney: The Great Synagogue. 2010. pp. 79 p. ISBN 978-0-9592404-3-6.
- To Be Continued: Memoirs and Musings. Sydney: Mandelbaum Publishing. 2010. pp. 222 p. ISBN 978-0-9804722-1-9.
- The Great Synagogue: A History of Sydney's Big Shule. Sydney: UNSW Press. 2008. pp. 342 p. ISBN 978-0-86840-927-6. Archived from the original on 9 February 2008.
- The Jewish Way: Jews and Judaism in Australia. Sydney: The Great Synagogue. 2002. pp. 72 p. ISBN 0-9592404-2-X.
- The Jews. Making Australian society. West Melbourne, Vic.: Thomas Nelson Australia. 1981. pp. 112 p. ISBN 0-17-005566-3.
- The Hampstead Synagogue 1892-1967. London: Mitchell Vallentine. 1967. pp. 120 p.

Apple also published numerous articles on Jews, Jewish history, the Jews in Australia, and various Jewish and interfaith themes. He was the author of "OzTorah", a weekly e-mail service and website presenting insights into the Torah reading, an Ask the Rabbi forum, and articles on Freemasonry, interfaith issues, British Jewish history, and the Australian Jewish community and its history. The OzTorah archives are available on his website at http://www.oztorah.com
