= Liebel =

Liebel is a surname. Notable people with the surname include:

- Frank Liebel (1919–1996), American football player
- Michael Liebel Jr., American politician
- Reinhard Liebel
- Willy Liebel (1897–1945), Nazi politician and SA general

== See also ==
- Emma Liébel
