= Lieblich =

Lieblich may refer to:

- Irene Lieblich (1923–2008), a Polish-born artist
- 22534 Lieblich, an asteroid
