= Severin Lieblein =

Norwegian writer

Johan Nicolai Severin Lieblein (16 May 1866 – 23 June 1933) was a Norwegian writer.

He was born in Kristiania as a son of Jens Lieblein (1827–1911) and his first wife Johanne Alette Danielsen (1838–1866). His father married anew in 1869.

He became known for the short story collections Fra fremmed land (1901), Kismet (1909) and I baldakinens skygge (1917) and the children's book Bedre mands børn (1902).
