= Orthodox Jewish philosophy =

Jewish philosophical tradition

Orthodox Jewish philosophy comprises the philosophical and theological teachings of Orthodox Judaism. Though Orthodox Judaism sees itself as the heir of traditional rabbinic Judaism, the present-day movement is thought to have first formed in the late 18th century, mainly in reaction to the Jewish emancipation and the growth of the Haskalah and Reform movements. Orthodox Jewish philosophy concerns itself with interpreting traditional Jewish sources, reconciling the Jewish faith with the changes in the modern world and the movement's relationships with the State of Israel and other Jewish denominations.

== Philosophies ==
Specific philosophies developed by Orthodox Jewish thinkers include:

- Torah Judaism, an ideological concept used to legitimize Jewish movements within the framework of Orthodox Jewish values.
- Hasidism, focusing on the importance of prayer, joy and the attachment to Tzadikim and Rebbes.
- Musar (ethics), stressing the importance of the study of ethical texts.
- Religious Zionism, an ideology that insists on the integration between Zionism and observance of Jewish law.
- Torah im Derech Eretz, a school of thought advocating the combination of Jewish and secular education.
- Torah Umadda, similar to Torah im Derech Eretz, advocating a combination of Jewish and secular education.
- Da'as Torah, the position that the opinion rabbinic authorities are to be sought in various circumstances.
- Dirah Betachtonim, a midrashic concept popularized by Chabad thinkers, the making of a "dwelling place for God in the lower realms" is thought to be the purpose of creation.

== Orthodox Jewish philosophers (from late 18th century) ==
While the majority of Orthodox rabbinic figures wrote primarily on Talmud and Jewish law (Halacha), some are known for their philosophical and theological writings.

=== Modern Thought Judaism ===
- Samson Raphael Hirsch (1808–1888), German rabbi, authored Horeb (1837), and Nineteen Letters (1836), considered a founder of Modern Orthodoxy and the Torah im Derech Eretz school of thought.
- Abraham Isaac Kook (1865–1935), former Chief Rabbi of Israel and an important thinker in Religious Zionism.
- Franz Rosenzweig (1886–1929), a theologian and philosopher, noted for his work The Star of Redemption (1921).
- Joseph Soloveitchik (1903–1993), a seminal figure in Modern Orthodox Judaism who helped popularize the Torah Umadda philosophy, authored The Lonely Man of Faith (1965) and Halakhic Man (1983).
- Yeshayahu Leibowitz (1903–1994), a religious philosopher in Israel.
- Eliezer Berkovits (1908–1992), authored a number of works on Jewish theology including God, Man, and History (1959) and Man and God: Studies in Biblical Theology (1969).
- Israel Eldad (1910 or 1922–1996), a Zionist teacher and writer associated with the Lehi movement.
- David Hartman (1931–2013), philosopher of contemporary Judaism, author of a number of works including A Living Covenant: The Innovative Spirit in Traditional Judaism (1998) and A Heart of Many Rooms: Celebrating the Many Voices Within Judaism (1999).
- Aharon Lichtenstein (b. 1933-2015), a noted Orthodox rabbi and rosh yeshiva who has lectured and published on Jewish philosophy and Talmud.
- Daniel Rynhold, Associate Professor of Jewish Philosophy at Yeshiva University and the author of Two Models of Jewish Philosophy: Justifying One's Practices (2005).

=== Haredi Judaism ===
- Elijah of Vilna (1720–1797), the Vilna Gaon, known primarily for his commentary on Talmud and Shulchan Aruch, the Vilna Gaon also authored a number of Kabbalistic works and is noted for his position on Tzimtzum.
- Chaim Volozhin (1749–1821), student of the Vilna Gaon, author of Nefesh Ha-Chaim dealing with Kabbalistic and general Jewish theological ideas.
- Israel Salanter (1810–1883), founder of the Musar movement, stressed the study of ethical literature as central to Jewish life.
- Eliyahu Dessler (1892 or 1830–1953), noted for his work Michtav me-Eliyahu.

=== Hasidic Judaism ===
- Yisroel Baal Shem Tov
- Dovber of Mezritch, the Maggid of Mezritch
- The Rebbes of Chabad (most notably, Shneur Zalman of Liadi, Menachem Mendel Schneerson)
- Nachman of Breslov
- Elimelech of Lizhensk
- Menachem Mendel of Kotzk
- Yehudah Aryeh Leib Alter, the Sfas Emes, second Rebbe of Ger
- Joel Teitelbaum, Rebbe of Satmar, anti-Zionist thinker

=== Sephardic Judaism ===
- Yosef Hayyim, the Ben Ish Chai
- Elijah Benamozegh
- José Faur

== See also ==
- Orthodox Judaism
- Jewish philosophy
