= Thomas Wran =

Australian architectural sculptor

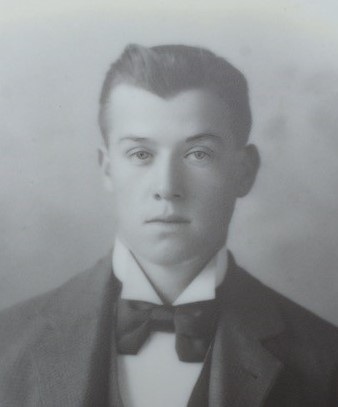
- Wran in February 1865, photographed by G. R. Gibbs
- Born: Thomas Vallance Wran; 9 March 1832; Chichester, West Sussex, United Kingdom
- Died: 7 September 1891 (aged 59); Hawkes Bay, Red Sea
- Burial place: Aden, Yemen
- Known for: Architectural sculpture
- Notable work: Bull, Price & Co and Edwards warehouses, 1874; Newton Bros Warehouse, 1875; Haymarket Branch, Commercial Bank of Sydney, 1876; The Great Synagogue, 1878; Founders Building Newington College, 1880; The General Post Office Sydney, 1883
- Style: High Victorian (Ruskinian Romanesque)
- Awards: Sculpture Prize, South London Industrial Exhibition, Feb. 1865 Sculpture Prize, Society of Arts

Thomas Vallance Wran (6 March 1832 – 9 September 1891) was an English born Ruskinian-Romanesque sculptor, who arrived in Australia in 1870 aged thirty-eight, and spent his remaining years working with three of Sydney's leading architects on major institutional monuments. His architectural sculpture is remarkable for its three-dimensional force, creativity, and the invention of an indigenous ornament.

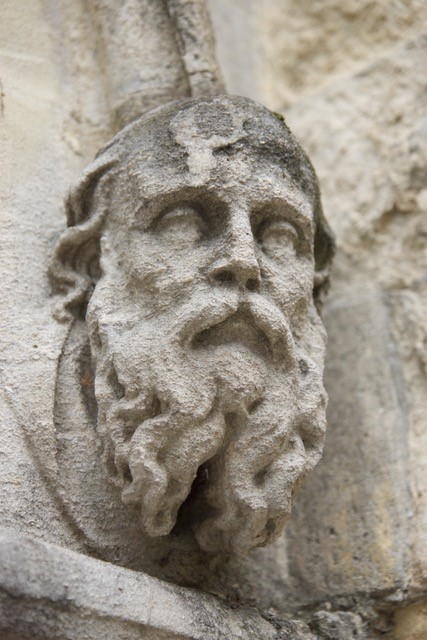
Head, St Peter the Great church, Chichester, 1852

== Early life and education ==
Thomas Vallance Wran was born on 6 March 1832 in Chichester, West Sussex, United Kingdom. He was the second son of five children born to George Wran (1809–1886), a tailor, and Elizabeth Jane Slaney (1809–?) from Somerstown. His parents were married and the children baptised in St Peter-the-Great Subdeanery Church in Chichester Cathedral's north transept.

Wran served his indenture as a stonemason with the Cathedral Works Organisation (CWO) which today operates as a private company. (Note: Chichester Stoneworks is the surviving company from the Cathedral Works Organisation (CWO) which began in the 17th century.)

On the completion of his training as a stonemason, Wran moved to London and attended the newly established Royal Architecture Museum in Canon Row, founded by members of the architectural profession led by G.G. Scott in 1851. The Museum's mission was to improve the technique and the aesthetic sensibility of a new generation of art workers through lectures, training in drawing and carving exercises copying examples from its extensive collection of 3,500 casts.

== Career ==
=== England ===
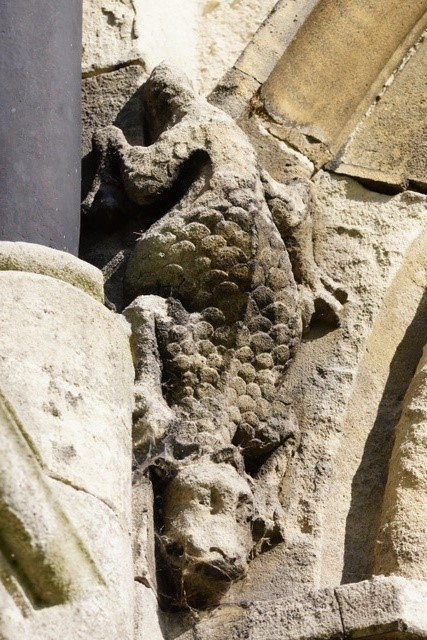
Dragon, St Mary Dalton Holme church, South Dalton, UK, 1861

Wran arrived at South Dalton in 1858 to work on the new St Mary's Dalton-Holme Church by Gothic Revival architect, John Loughborough Pearson (1817–97). He was accompanied by Eleanor Susan Walton and the two children from her marriage to Henry Price (b. 1822–?). Dalton Holme church (1858–61) for Beaumont Hotham, 3rd Baron Hotham that cost £24,000, much of it spent on elaborate sculptural decoration for the porch, outside grotesques, lizards and dragons, and interior ornament. (Note: Building News remarked on its proportions and the richness of its details: "lizards might well bask on its stones and birds build in its crannies; indeed grotesque animals appear liberally in its carved decoration.")

Wran returned to London to Pimlico, a recent Thomas Cubitt development next to Belgravia. Struggling to find regular employment as a sculptor, Wran worked as a painter and plumber and for some years, was a tobacconist at Lambeth Walk. In 1865 he entered sculptures in the South London industrial Exhibition and Society of Arts Competition and won prizes.

=== Australia ===
Frustrated and still unable to find work, Wran emigrated to Queensland. On 7 July 1870 Thomas and Eleanor were married in Holy Trinity Bessborough Church, Westminster by J.L. Pearson, shortly before they sailed for Rockhampton on the Royal Dane.

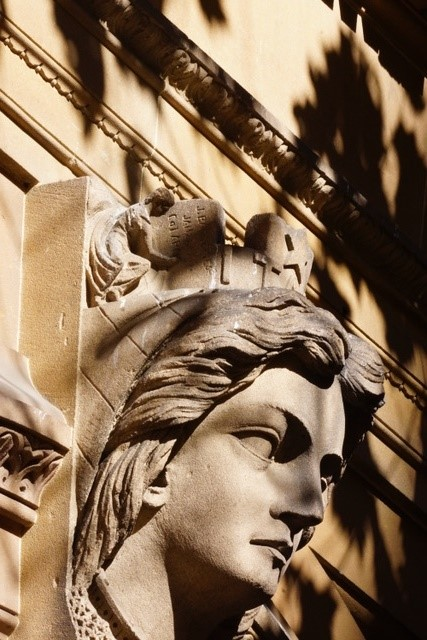
Italy keystone head, The General Post Office, Martin Place, Sydney, Australia, 1883.

Within a year of taking up a 120-acre selection at St. Lawrence, (Note: No. 26 between Freshwater (or St Lawrence Creek, subsequently renamed Wran Creek on the Bruce Highway) and Saltwater creek. Under the terms of the 1868 Selection Act Wran built a dwelling and outbuildings and fenced in the land. The 'Wran house' is located in the 1875 Survey, IMG_201802211 125046_4CS, 1875.) Wran constructed a dwelling on the south bank of Freshwater Creek. Eleanor's daughter drowned six weeks after their arrival on 26 January 1871. A year later, Wran abandoned the property and sailed to Sydney and restarted his career. His first commissioned work was the former Good Samaritan Convent on Pitt Street below Belmore Park on Garden Road for D.W. Ryan. Harry Walton Price (1852–1914), his stepson, soon followed him, residing at Queen's Place next to the Balmain post office in Balmain. Wran and Eleanor followed them. Wran purchased three lots in Caroline Street on the Waterview Estate and over the years built three residences: No. 2, 'Myrtle Villa' for himself, No. 6 for his stepson Harry Walton Wran, and a third at No. 4. In the years between 1872 and 1887, Wran completed no less than ten substantial architectural sculpture commissions for three of Sydney's most eminent architects: Thomas Rowe (1829–1899), George Allen Mansfield (1834–1908) and James Barnet (1827–1904).

== Death ==
In 1891, following the death of his father at Wandsworth, Wran returned to London with Eleanor and their ten-year-old granddaughter, Louisa Isabella Wran, to finalise family matters. Wran had been unwell for some time. Workers in stone are exposed daily to stone dust and frequently suffer from silicosis. On the return voyage to Sydney aboard the P & O liner Victoria, (Note: The Victoria registered to P & O, was a 6,091 gross tonnage 'Jubilee Class' liner built by Caird Co, Greenoch, UK, in 1887-1909. At 141.93 and 15.84 m (465.6 and 52.0 ft) beam. She was large and fast with a maximum speed of 16 knots and 386 passenger capacity, 230 in first class) Wran suffered an apoplectic attack and died suddenly off Hawkes Bay in the Red Sea on 7 September 1891. Reports of Wran's death were published in several papers in Sydney and Sussex Agricultural Express on Saturday 14 November 1891. When the Victoria broke its journey briefly for a day to take on water and coal, Wran was buried in the English cemetery in Aden. Eleanor lived at 10 Ann Street, Balmain, until her death in 1901. The politician Neville Wran was his great grandson.

== Sculpture in England ==
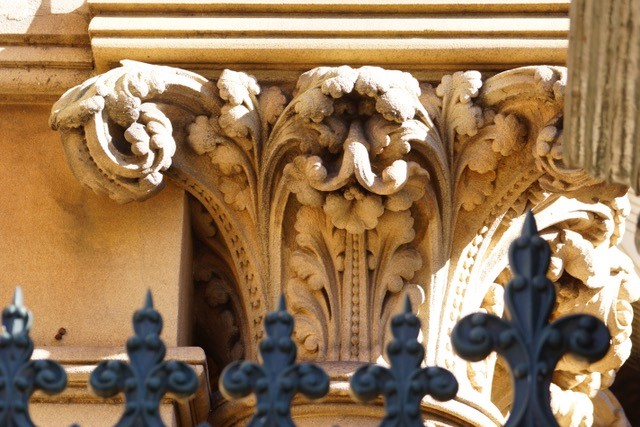
Porch capital, The Great Synagogue, Elizabeth St, Sydney, Australia, 1878.

Stonemasons work in teams not as individual artists and do not sign their work. A team may indicate it work with a special mark in a practice dating back to ancient Egypt. 19th century architectural sculpture, unlike studio sculpture, was unsigned. The attribution of in situ architectural sculpture presents a problem, much more so than for paintings and drawings. Art historians rely on stylistic traits, personal mannerisms, press reports, personal correspondence to identify an artist. None survive for Wran. Press reports and a recurring detail alone identify sculpture by Wran. His signature is a detail: the stone skin splits and is peeled back in an elongated 'V' which is infilled with round buttons or inverted darts. The Italian art critic and historian, Giovanni Morelli (1816–1891) in 1880 offered a new method for authenticating Renaissance paintings and drawings which isolated artist mannerisms in rendering minor details such as hands, ears, noses. His method is equally applicable to sculpture. Besides the signature V detail, Wran is recognised by his choice of charming bird subjects and forceful three-dimensionality.

=== Sculptural style ===
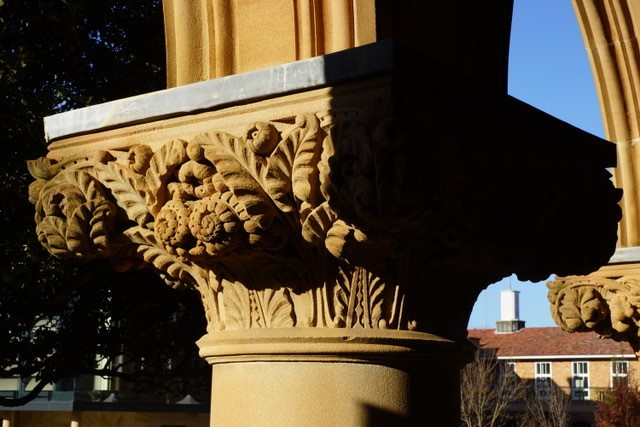
Fern capital, north colonnade, Founders Wing, Newington College, Stanmore, 1880.

John Ruskin (1819–1900) favoured a flat painterly style of sculpture and recommended low bas-relief (raised or modelled relievo) in lieu of high alto-relievo with its high rendering of plastic form. Against Ruskin, wherever the opportunity presented itself, Wran produced fully round sculpture that leapt off the wall surface instead of cling to it. In all other respects, Wran's sculpture is comprehensively Ruskinian, and unlike classical sculpture, refuses ever to repeat the same motif, with the sole exception the classical keystone heads on the Martin Place front of the General Post Office (1883). Wran never repeated the same detail. Sydney sandstone wrought a change of style that was both an inspiration and crucial turning point in Wran's development. English Portland stone and Bath stone have a finer grain than Sydney sandstone, with its warm golden radiance under certain lights from its silica content. On exposure, green "yellow block" sandstone acquires an attractive yellow to ocher colour from the presence of iron as siderite, in contrast to the coldness of English stones. The physical differences caused a change of technique, greater depth and roundness to exploit the stone's expressive coarse grain and enhance the effects of the intense Sydney light. Wran enjoyed greater freedom in Sydney. This released his genius and helped him develop in new directions from his Romanesque roots, while allowing him simultaneously to fulfill the generalised wishes of the architects.

=== Romanesque idiom ===
Chichester is on the south coast of England, only a short distance from the English Channel, and has long been exposed to French and continental European influences, especially following the arrival of Romanesque from Norman Caen in the 12th century. In his early years Wran worshipped in Chichester cathedral. The Norman Romanesque splendour of the cathedral formed his taste and exposed him to a free attitude towards sculpture that may explain his openness to new approaches, novel subjects, new ideas, experimentation, and devotion to exacting technique in opposition to rigid classical standards. It may well have eased his way forward and pushed his talent and help to explain Wran's endless invention.

== Sculpture in Sydney ==
=== Invention of an indigenous order ===
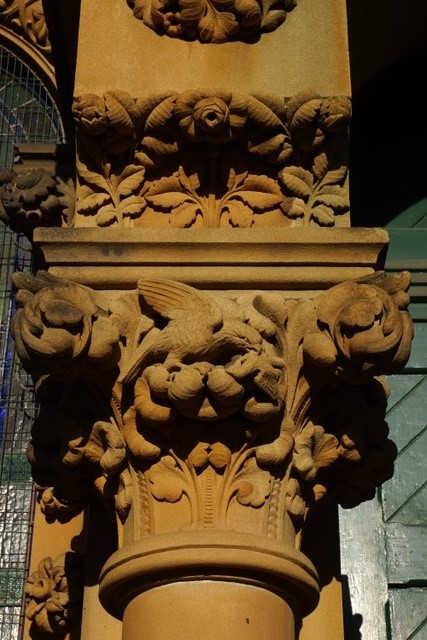
Kite capital: Bulls Warehouse, Sydney, 1874

Wran was the first sculptor to design and execute a completely indigenous inspired architectural order in stone taking native Australian animals and birds as its subject in mid-1873. Five months prior to this, the Irish Catholic Diocesan architect for Sydney, D.W. Ryan, had presented a specimen capital by done by Wran that substituted Eucalypt gum leaves for acanthus leaves at the end of a lecture given to the newly reconvened Institute of Architects in February 1873. This is the earliest documented public occasion in which an Australian decorative style was presented to a professional audience. The design was greeted by instant applause in approval. Later the same year, Thomas Rowe commissioned Wran to sculpt two warehouses in Pitt Street, each of them with a wide selection of native flora and fauna, which caused a sensation in the press. The General Post Office was the climax of Wran's Sydney career. During these same years, Wran sculpted the Haymarket Branch of the Commercial Bank of Sydney, The Great Synagogue and Newington College at Stanmore. The bank in Italian Renaissance demanded special stylistic adjustments on Wran's part; the Synagogue with its basic Romanesque combined eastern Byzantine with exotic glances towards the Alhambra. James Barnet's General Post Office is Italian Renaissance and Wran's sculpture there is less inventive, and arguably of less intrinsic artistic significance than his work on the 08/Pitt Street warehouses a decade before this. For Mansfield's Haymarket Branch of the Commercial Banking Company of Sydney, Wran broke the accustomed classical conservative mould at this time for banks. It is remarkable for its inventiveness and tactile seductiveness, refinement, and subtle manipulation in scale of its facades. Without question the masterpiece of Wran's later career is the north wing colonnade of Newington College Founders Hall, Stanmore, which returned to the indigenous theme of the earlier warehouses in Pitt Street, this time, to concentrate on flora motifs of intertwined complexity in foliage with a sensuous voluptuousness unrivaled for its voluptuous complexity.

=== Englishness ===
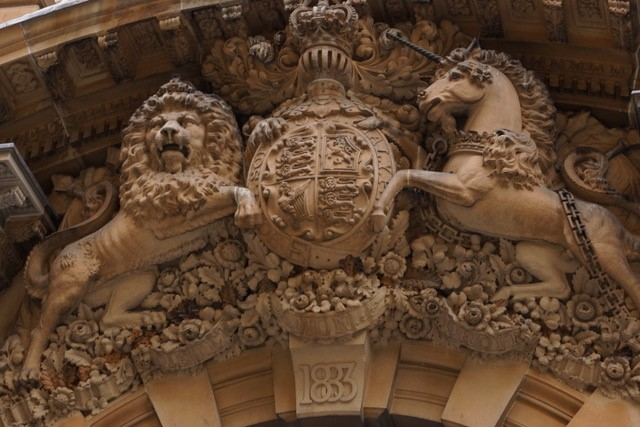
Coat of arms, The General Post Office, Sydney

Wran was an Englishman through and through, a transplant whose ties and loyalty to England were never in doubt. He carved elaborate coats of arms on government buildings that served as symbols of English power and control. Under Ryan and Rowe his early sculpture was in a contrary spirit, based on the scientific rendition of Australian flora and fauna specimens exhibited in the College Street Australian Museum. In a very real sense, the sculpture expressed an independent taste that departs from the stale traditional architectural decoration norms and expressly engages with indigenous Australian fauna and flora themes in a rising Sydney not yet at the height of its economic prosperity. Government buildings, whether in Sydney or the country, were meant to express the majesty of imperial authority, and advertise colonial success in an excess of confidence and swaggering ambition. One was bound to see everywhere coats of arms on public buildings attesting imperial authority and the reach of the Crown. Wran sculpted coats of arms on the Chief Secretary's Building, Macquarie Street, on which Wran chiseled his name; two on the General Post Office, one over the main entrance in Martin Place below the Giovanni Fontana (1821–1893) statue of Queen Victoria, the other in Pitt Street. Coats of arms adhered to a strict template that permitted little or no deviation. Wran countered the stultifying effect and lifted the sculpture of the coats of arms to a new artistic level that gave them a vitality that enhanced their palpable physicality.

== Known sculptural works ==
=== England ===
1852: St Peter the Great Church, cnr West & Tower Streets, Chichester (1847–1852). Architect: Richard Cromwell Carpenter; Builder: Mr Nicole of London. The heads in West Street are likely by T.V. Wran during his stonemason apprenticeship to CWO (1848–1852).

1861: St Mary, Dalton-Holme church, South Dalton, East Riding, Yorkshire (1858–1861). Architect: John Loughborough Pearson; Builder: George Myers; Wran sculpture: south porch interior and exterior, lizards and dragons, tower gargoyle figures.

1865: 'Stone carving, Dead linnet suspended from a Maple Branch', First Prize in First Division, Class 1: Artistic category, in the South London Working Class INDUSTRIAL EXHIBITION at Lambeth Baths Westminster Road, p. 22, No. 215 (February 1865).

1865: 'Ornament in stone, after a Gothic bracket', First Prize, South London Working Class INDUSTRIAL EXHIBITION, at Lambeth Baths.

Prize for unidentified sculpture at the Society of Arts competition (1865 later in the year).

=== Sydney ===
1872: The Good Samaritan Convent, 484 Pitt Street. Architect: D.W. Ryan. The extent of Wran's sculpture is not recorded but four gate posts in sandstone were reclaimed when the convent was demolished in 1901 to make way for the new Central Railway Station and removed to St Scholastica's College, on the corner of Avenue and Arcadia Roads in Glebe.

1874: H. Bull and S. Hordern Warehouse, 102–104 Pitt Street. Built 1873–74, destroyed in the Great Fire of October 1890. The stone was sold and the 4-storey street facade was moved to Annandale and reconstructed as the front of a new Primitive Methodist church, now the Annandale Creative Arts Centre, 81A Johnston Street, (dedicated on 16 September 1891). Sculpture: Thomas and Harry Wran, assisted by Robert McCredie jnr (son of the Balmain builder). Commission was for a total 17 items on 2 porches and one-storey pediment, comprising a selection of native Australian birds and animals specimens found and studied by Wran in the collection of the Australian Museum.

1875: Newton Bros (Vickery No. 2) Warehouse, 72–78 Pitt Street. Architect: Thomas Rowe (1872–75). Demolished (1927). Sculptors Thomas and Harry Wran assisted by the builder's son, Robert McCredie jnr. As for the Bull Warehouse nearby, the facade consisted of a large selection of native birds and animals based on specimens found and researched in the collection of the Australian Museum.

1876: Coat of Arms, Chief Secretary's Building, 121 Macquarie Street. Architect: James Barnet. Sculptor: Thomas Wran. Signed on the back of the balcony by T.V. Wran and dated 1876.

1876: Haymarket Branch of the Commercial Bank of Sydney, 784 George Street, Haymarket. Architect: George Allan Mansfield, 1978. Sculpture: Thomas and Harry Wran. Wran (assisted by Harry) was responsible for the stone sculpture on the George and Hay Street facades.

1878: The Great Synagogue, 187A Elizabeth Street. Architect: Thomas Rowe. Sculpture: Thomas and Harry Wran. Wran was responsible for the porch inside and outside, colonnade capitals and general decorative carving. The work on the Castlereagh Street facade is by Wran and is more relaxed and by far the most interesting carving on the synagogue.

1880: Founders Wing, Newington College, Stanmore. Architect: Thomas Rowe (1878–80). The sculpture of the main tower entrance and north wing colonnade capitals is recorded as "Thomas Wran and Son" (Harry Walton Price).

1882: The General Post Office, 1 Martin Place. Architect, James Barnet (1872–1887). Sculpture: Thomas Wran and Harry (1883). Wran was responsible for the coat of arms over the main entrance, 24 keystone heads on the Martin Place front; coat of arms and keystone heads of the Four Seasons on Pitt Street.

1887: The coat of arms on the portico of the Balmain Court House, 368 Darling Street, Balmain. Architect: James Barnet. Sculpture: Thomas & Harry Wran (c. 1887).
