= Lieblein House =

Historic house in Michigan, United States

- U.S. National Register of Historic Places
- Michigan State Historic Site
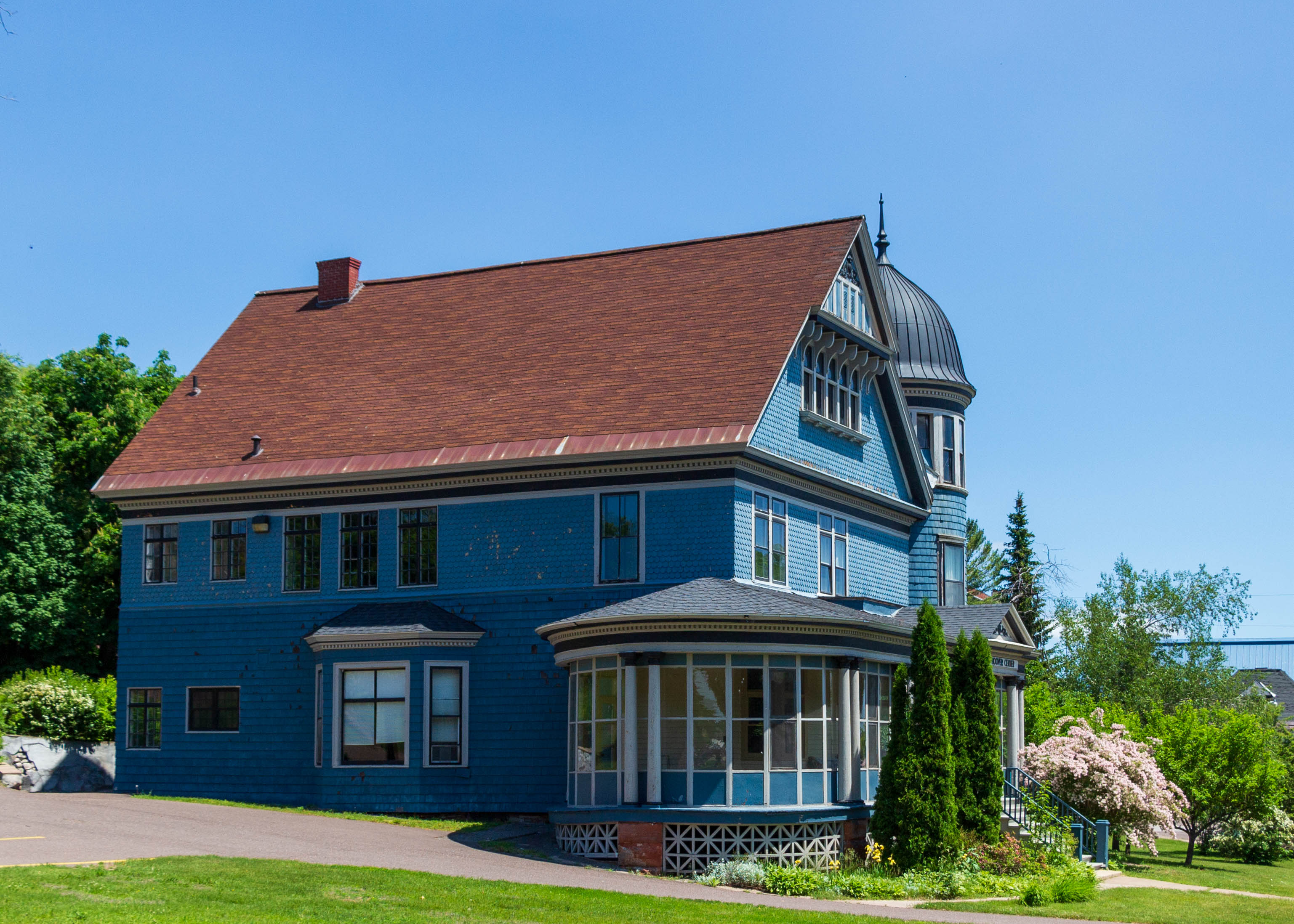

- Location within Michigan Location within the United States
- Interactive map
- Location: 525 Quincy St., Hancock, Michigan
- Coordinates: 47°7′37″N 88°35′19″W
- Built: 1895
- Architectural style: Queen Anne
- NRHP reference No.: 80001860

Significant dates
- Added to NRHP: April 03, 1980
- Designated MSHS: June 15, 1979

The Lieblein House is a single-family house located at 525 Quincy Street in Hancock, Michigan. It is also known as the Hoover Center. The structure was designated a Michigan State Historic Site in 1979 and listed on the National Register of Historic Places in 1980.

== History ==
The Lieblein House was built in 1895 by William Washburn, who owned a local Hancock clothing store. In about 1905, Washburn sold the house to Edward Lieblein, a wholesale grocer who owned stores in Hancock and Calumet. The house remained in the Lieblein family until 1979, when Edward Lieblein Jr. sold it to Suomi College, renamed Finlandia University in 2000. The college renamed it the "Vaino & Judith Hoover Center" after the patrons Vaino and Judith Hoover who funded the purchase. At the time of Finlandia's closing in 2023, the building housed the offices of the President, Institutional Advancement, Alumni Relations, and Communications. In October 2024, the house was sold to a private individual.

== Description ==
The Lieblein House is a rectangular, two-and-a-half-story Queen Anne style house, sitting on a sandstone foundation and covered with rectangular and fishscale shingles. It has an enclosed wrap-around porch with Doric columns and narrow one-over-one windows. The narrow windows are also used in a three-story polygonal turret topped with a galvanized metal roof and spire. The porch and turret gives the facade both horizontal and vertical lines. A bay window and multiple multi-paned and double-hung windows light the interior. The roof is gabled on three sides, with leaded glass Palladian windows in the side gables.
