= Israel Porush =

Australian-Israeli rabbi (1907–1991)

Israel Porush OBE
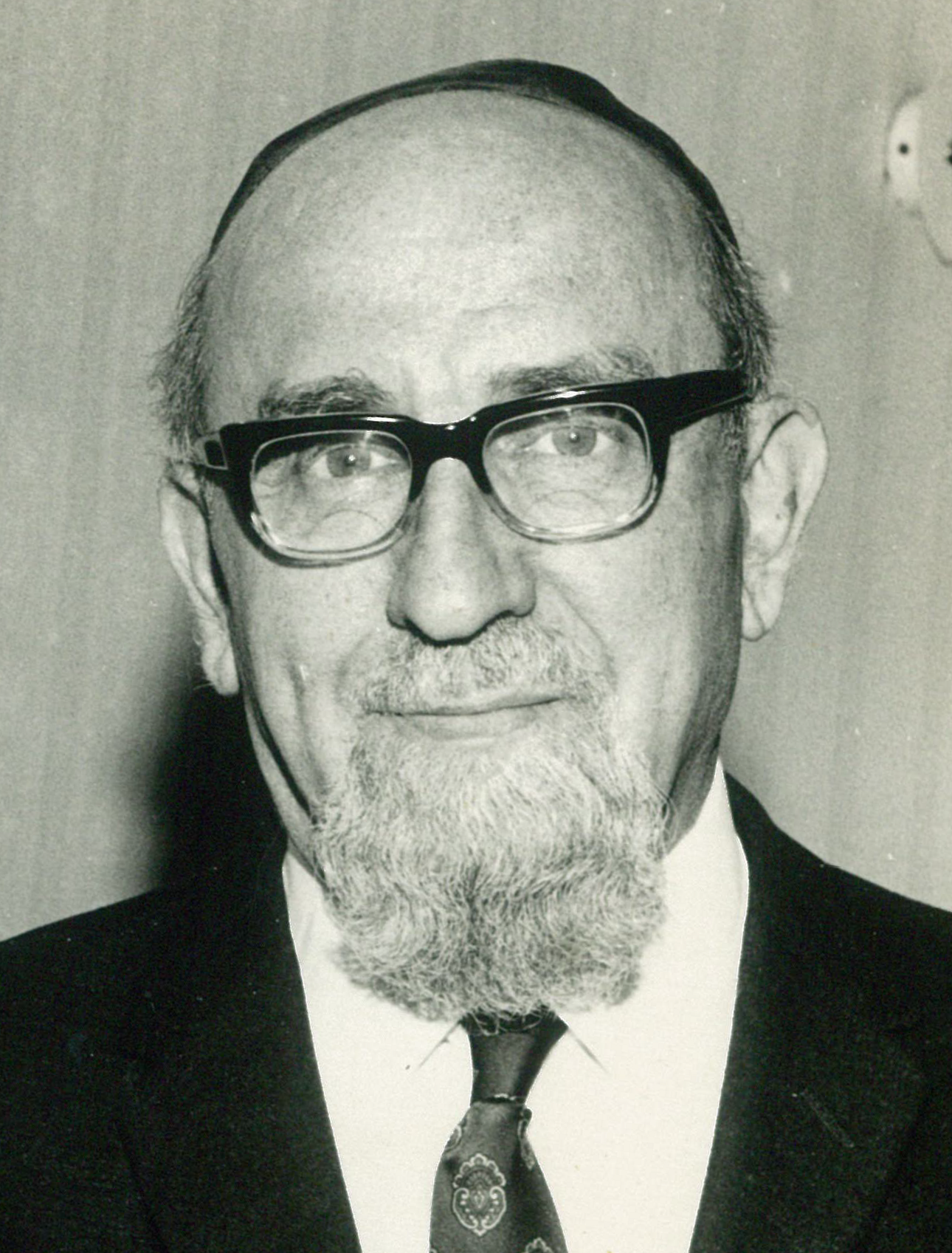

Personal life
- Born: 16 July 1907 Jerusalem
- Died: 22 May 1991 (aged 83) Melbourne, Australia

Religious life
- Religion: Judaism
- Denomination: Orthodox
- Profession: Rabbi

Jewish leader
- Predecessor: Rabbi E. M. Levy
- Successor: Rabbi Raymond Apple
- Synagogue: Great Synagogue (Sydney)
- Position: Senior Rabbi

Israel Porush OBE (1907–1991) was an Australian rabbi and communal leader.

== Biography ==
Born in Jerusalem on 16 July 1907, Porush's education balanced religious and secular studies through courses at the University of Berlin and the Hildesheimer Rabbinical Seminary. In 1933, he obtained a doctorate in mathematics from the University of Marburg while also being ordained as a rabbi. After moving to England, he accepted a rabbinic post at the Finchley Synagogue. In 1938, he immigrated to Australia to become the senior rabbi at the Great Synagogue in Sydney, a position he held for over three decades. During his tenure as rabbi, Porush played a key role in uniting the Australian Jewish community, bridging the gap between the established Jewish community and the influx of newcomers arriving after World War II. He was involved in interfaith work through the NSW Council of Christians and Jews. He was also instrumental in the founding of Jewish day schools in Australia. Porush actively documented Jewish history in Australia and served as president of the Australian Jewish Historical Society (1948–1974). He died 22 May 1991.

Porush's daughter Naomi married the activist and communal leader Isi Leibler.

== Books ==
- Today’s Challenge to Judaism: An Australian Rabbi Discusses the Problems Facing His People (Curranwong, 1972)
- The House of Israel: A Study of Sydney Jewry from its Foundation (The Hawthorn Press, 1977)
- The Journal of an Australian Rabbi (Australian Jewish Historical Society, 1992)
