= Jens Lieblein =

Norwegian Egyptologist and magazine editor (1827–1911)

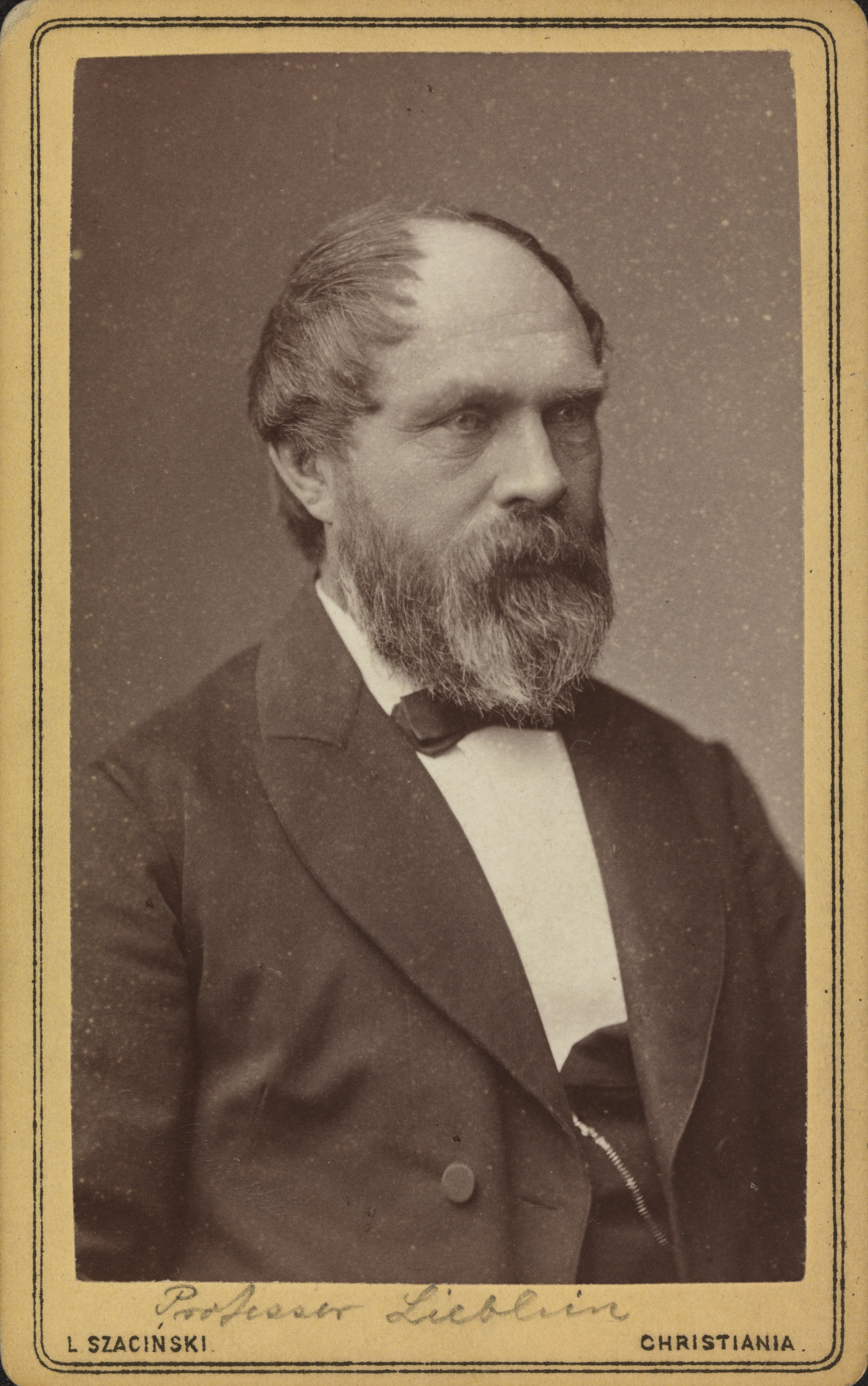
- Jens Lieblein in 1881
- Born: 23 December 1827; Christiania, Norway
- Died: 13 August 1911 (aged 83); Eidsvoll
- Education: Royal Frederick University
- Occupation: Egyptologist
- Children: Severin Lieblein
- Awards: Commander of the Order of St. Olav (1905); Officer of the Italian Order of the Crown; Knight of the Portuguese Order of Christ; Knight of the Austrian Order of the Iron Crown, Knight of the Turkish Order of the Medjidie

Jens Daniel Carolus Lieblein (23 December 1827 – 13 August 1911) was a Norwegian Egyptologist and magazine editor. He was a professor at the University of Oslo from 1876, the first professor of Egyptology in Norway.

Lieblein was born in Christiania as a son of shoemaker Johan Martin Lieblein and Anne Karine Hofgaard. Lieblein's father died in 1838, and Lieblein started working at a sawmill from the age of 11 years. In his leisure time, he studied history and languages, including German, French, Latin and Greek. After 14 years at the sawmill, he attended a school in Christiania. From 1855, he studied philology and history at the University, graduating in 1861. He began a study of ancient Indian culture and learned Sanskrit. He then focused on ancient Egyptian culture, studying in Berlin, Paris, Turin, London and Leiden.

He was present at the opening of the Suez Canal in 1869, representing Norway along with playwright Henrik Ibsen. Leiblein was appointed professor of Egyptology at the Royal Frederick University in 1876, the first professor of Egyptology in Norway. He edited the magazine Norden from 1866 to 1868, and Nyt norsk Tidskrift (with Ernst Sars) from 1877 to 1878.

He died at Eidsvoll.

== Works ==
His earliest publication was Aegyptische Chronologie (1863), which did much to systematize that branch, especially in the sequel, Recherches sur la chronologie egyptienne d'après les listes généalogiques (1873). Among Leiblein's major works are the dictionaries Dictionnaire de noms hiéroglyphiques, en ordre généalogique et alphabétique in French in 1871, and the subsequent Hieroglyphisches Namen-Wörterbuch, genealogisch und alphabetisch geordnet in German in 1891. He also published three volumes on ancient Egyptian religion, Gammelægyptisk Religion, populært fremstillet, issued between 1883 and 1885 in Norwegian. Other works are Handel und Schiffahrt auf dem rothen Meere in alten Zeiten (1886), and Le livre égyptien: Que mon nom fleurisse (1895).

== Family ==
He was married to Johanne Alette Danielsen from 1864 to 1866, to Jonette Nielsen from 1869 to 1893, and to Dagny Louise Brodersen from 1899. He was the father of writer Severin Lieblein.

== Awards ==
Lieblein was decorated as a Knight of the Order of St. Olav in 1889, and a Commander in 1905. He was decorated an Officer of the Italian Order of the Crown, and a Knight of the Portuguese Order of Christ, the Austrian Order of the Iron Crown, and the Turkish Order of the Medjidie.
