= Albanese government =

Australian government (2022–present)

Albanese government

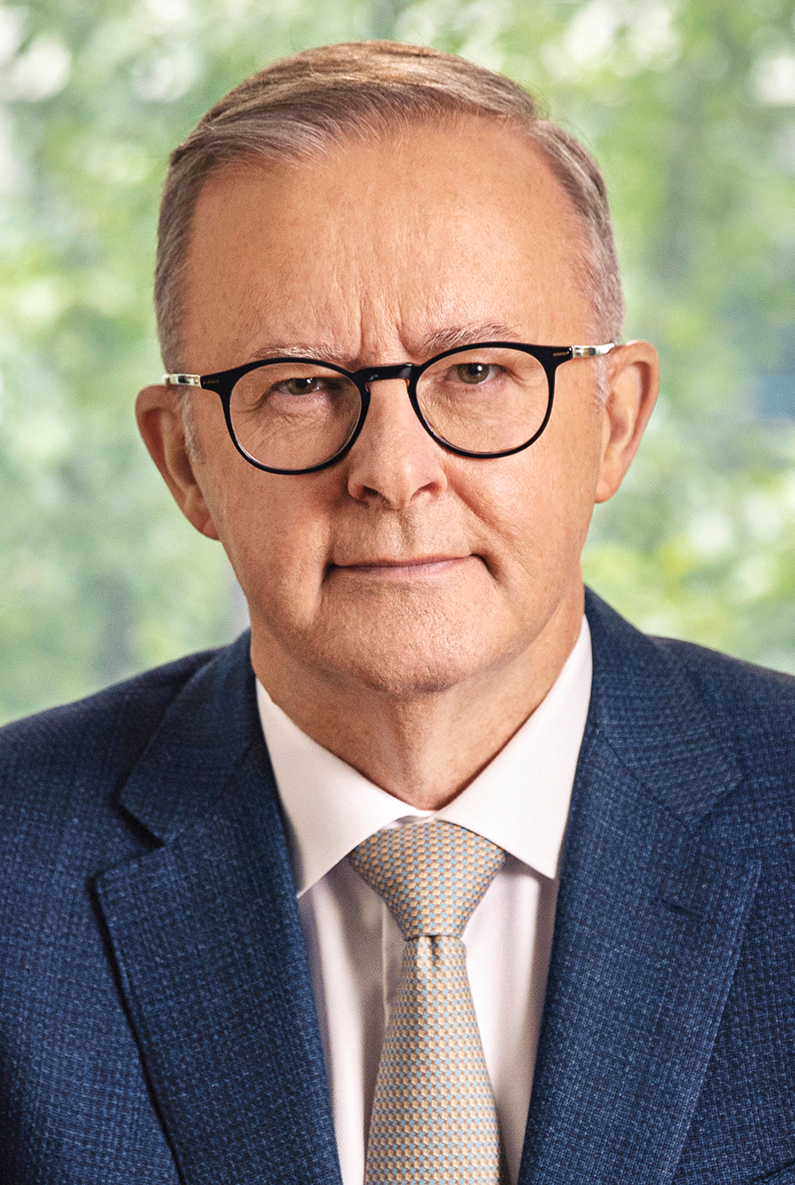

In office
- 23 May 2022 – present
- Monarch: Elizabeth II; Charles III
- Governor-General: David Hurley (May 2022 – July 2024); Sam Mostyn (July 2024 – present)
- Prime Minister: Anthony Albanese
- Deputy: Richard Marles
- Party: Australian Labor Party
- Status: Majority
- Origin: Labor wins 2022 federal election
- Predecessor: Morrison government

The Albanese government is the sitting federal government of Australia, led by Prime Minister Anthony Albanese of the Labor Party. The Albanese government was sworn in on 23 May 2022 by the governor-general of Australia, David Hurley. The party governed with a two-to-three seat majority in the House of Representatives in its first term, (Note: The government won 77 seats at the 2022 election, and increased its majority to 78 out of 151 seats following the Aston by-election in April 2023.) and expanded its majority to 19 seats in its second term. It won a plurality of seats in the Senate at the 2025 election, though has never held a majority of seats in the upper house.

Albanese succeeded the Morrison government after the Liberal–National Coalition was defeated at the 2022 election, and saw the first Labor government to be elected at the federal level since the Rudd government was defeated at the 2013 election. The Albanese government went on win a landslide victory in the 2025 federal election, making Albanese the first Prime Minister to serve a full term and win another since John Howard's victory at the 2004 election.

== Background ==
=== 2022 federal election ===
The 2022 election was called by Morrison on 10 April 2022, when he visited the governor-general, advising the latter to prorogue Parliament and dissolve the House of Representatives. The governor-general accepted Morrison's recommendations, as is the custom in Australia's Westminster system of government. The Parliament was then prorogued and the House of Representatives dissolved the next morning. The Labor election campaign focused on aged care in Australia, the introduction of a National Anti-Corruption Commission, childcare subsidies, climate change, a similar defence budget to the Coalition but with a Defence Posture Review into resources and strategy, education, electric vehicles, farming, health, housing, infrastructure, a review of the National Disability Insurance Scheme (NDIS), as well as measures to help older Australians.

The election was held on 21 May 2022. As of 10:00PM AEST on election night, the Labor Party (led by Anthony Albanese) was projected to form a government by ABC News, although it was not clear whether they would have a majority or a minority. Notable outcomes included the popularity of community independents in several inner-city seats, costing Treasurer and Deputy Liberal Leader Josh Frydenberg his seat; a particularly sizable swing from the Coalition to Labor in Western Australia; and notably strong support for the Australian Greens in some inner-city Brisbane seats. After the bulk of the votes had been counted and a Labor victory appeared inevitable, Morrison conceded the election, and then announced his intention to resign as the Liberal Party leader. The Coalition's loss was attributed to Morrison's unpopularity with voters and the popularity of centrist "teal independents" in certain inner-city electorates. Albanese, who also made history as the first Italian-Australian to secure the position of Prime Minister, was sworn in as the new Prime Minister of Australia on 23 May 2022.

==== 2023 by-election ====
On 9 February 2023, former Liberal Party cabinet minister Alan Tudge resigned from Parliament, triggering a by-election in his seat of Aston. In an unexpected result, Labor's Mary Doyle won the by-election, marking the first time a governing party won a by-election against the opposition since 1920. As a result of this, Albanese's government increased their majority in the House of Representatives to 78 of 151 seats.

== Appointments ==
=== Interim Ministry (May 2022) ===
Although it was not certain on election night that Labor would win a majority, no other party could realistically form a government. Accordingly, two days after the election, Albanese, deputy leader Richard Marles, shadow treasurer Jim Chalmers, and senators Penny Wong and Katy Gallagher were sworn in as an interim five-person ministry. The five ministers divided all portfolios between them until the full ministry was determined. According to Australia's ABC News, the governor-general David Hurley would not have sworn in Albanese without assurances that Labor could provide stable government, as well as legal advice that this was the proper course of action. Albanese confirmed that he secured confidence and supply from the crossbench in the event that he was not able to form majority government.

=== Full Ministry (June 2022 onwards) ===
Albanese announced the composition of his full first ministry on 31 May 2022. Given that frontbenchers Kristina Keneally and Terri Butler were not re-elected, Murray Watt and Clare O’Neil were chosen by the Labor caucus to replace them in the cabinet. With 19 female frontbenchers and 10 female cabinet ministers, it became the most gender-equal ministry in Australian history. The full ministry was sworn in by Governor-General David Hurley on 1 June 2022.

Albanese announced a reshuffle of his Ministry on 28 July 2024 due to the impending retirements of Linda Burney and Brendan O'Connor. Senator Malarndirri McCarthy succeeded Burney as the Minister for Indigenous affairs while Andrew Giles assumed the Skills and Training portfolio. Clare O'Neil also assumed the housing portfolio.

Following the 2025 Australian federal election held on 3 May 2025, a cabinet reshuffle occurred in mid-May. While Albanese, Richard Marles, Jim Chalmers, Katy Gallagher, Penny Wong and Don Farrell's portfolios remained unchanged in the Second Albanese ministry, Michelle Rowland was appointed as Attorney-General, Tim Ayres was appointed as Minister for Industry and Innovation, Anika Wells as Minister for Communications and Sport, Amanda Rishworth as Minister for Employment and Workplace Relations and Anne Aly as Minister for Small Business. In addition, Daniel Mulino was appointed as Assistant Treasurer, Jess Walsh as Minister for Early Childhood Education, Andrew Charlton as Cabinet Secretary, Jenny McAllister as Minister for NDIS, Tanya Plibersek as Minister for Social Services, Murray Watt as Minister for the Environment and Water and Sam Rae as Minister for Aged Care and Seniors.

=== Public service ===
Phil Gaetjens, the Secretary of the Department of Prime Minister and Cabinet under Scott Morrison, took leave the day before the Albanese government was sworn in. This had been expected given Albanese had indicated he would not want Gaetjens to continue in the role. On 6 June 2022, former University of Melbourne vice-chancellor Glyn Davis replaced Gaetjens. In June 2024, the government announced that Matt Kean, a former Liberal Treasurer of New South Wales, would be appointed to lead the Climate Change Authority.

=== Judiciary ===
On 17 October 2022, the government appointed Jayne Jagot as a Justice of the High Court of Australia, replacing the retiring Justice Patrick Keane. On Jagot's appointment, the High Court of Australia had a majority of female Justices for the first time in its history. On 6 November 2023, the government appointed Robert Beech-Jones as a High Court Justice. Beech-Jones replaced Stephen Gageler, who was made the Chief Justice of Australia upon the retirement of Susan Kiefel. These appointments ended the brief female majority on the court.

=== Ambassadorships ===
On 30 September 2022, the government announced that it had nominated former Defence Minister Stephen Smith as the next High Commissioner of Australia to the United Kingdom. Smith commenced his position in January 2023. On 20 December 2022, the government announced that it had nominated former prime minister Kevin Rudd as the next Ambassador of Australia to the United States. Rudd commenced his position in March 2023.

=== Governor-General ===
On 3 April 2024, the prime minister announced that King Charles III had approved Albanese's appointment of Sam Mostyn to succeed General David Hurley as Governor-General of Australia. Mostyn commenced her position on 1 July 2024.

=== Government officials ===
In July 2024, owing to the rise in antisemitic activity in Australia following the October 7 attacks in Israel, Albanese appointed Jillian Segal as Australian special envoy on combatting antisemitism. Segal has a long history of advocacy for Jewish communities and combating antisemitism, and her appointment was supported by the federal opposition. In October 2024, Albanese appointed Malik as Australian special envoy on combatting Islamophobia. Malik is a prominent Muslim leader and advocate for interfaith dialogue.

== First term of government (2022–2025) ==
=== Economy ===
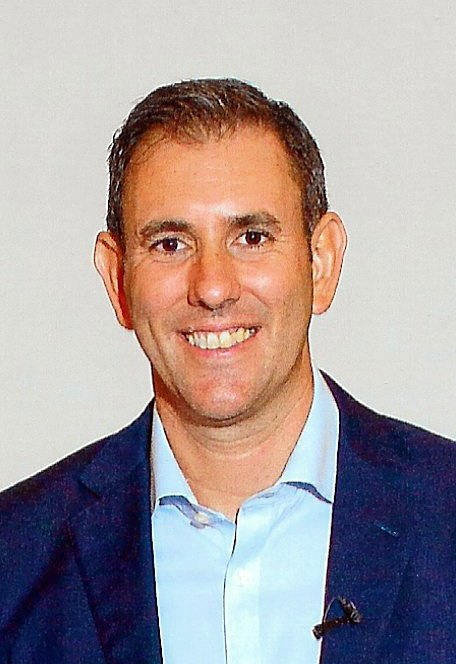
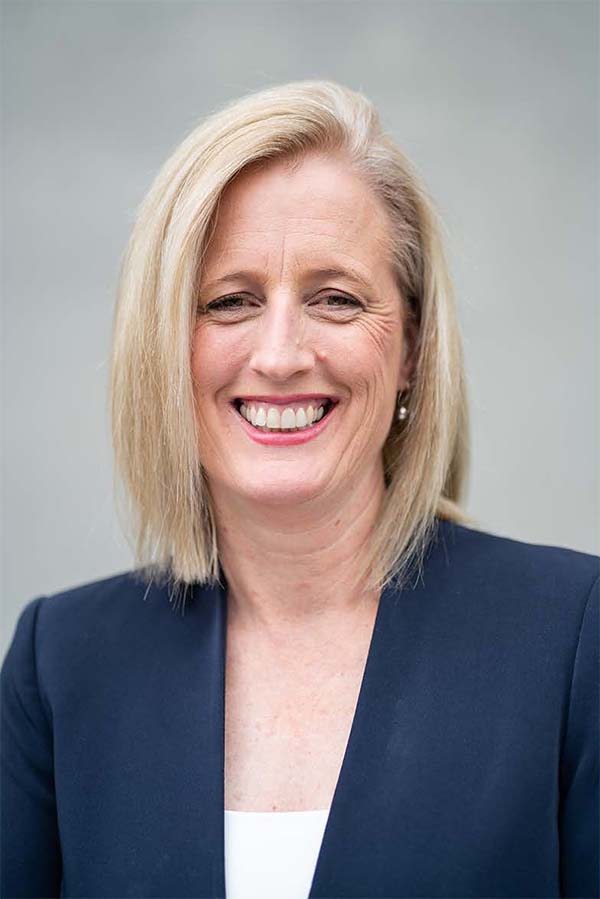
Jim Chalmers (current Treasurer) and Katy Gallagher (current Finance Minister).

Jim Chalmers was sworn in as Treasurer of Australia and Katy Gallagher was sworn in as Finance Minister as part of the interim Albanese ministry. The Albanese government commenced amidst the 2021–23 global surge in inflation. The Australian inflation rate peaked at 7.5% at the end of 2022, a 32-year high, before easing to 2.8% by October 2024. Between 4 May 2022 and 8 November 2023, the Reserve Bank of Australia steadily raised interest rates from 0.10% to 4.35%, a 12-year high. The Bank then maintained the rate of 4.35% until cutting it to 4.10% on 19 February 2025, the first rate cut since March 2020.

==== Tax cuts and reform ====
On 28 February 2023, the government announced that it would seek to reduce tax concessions on superannuation accounts with more than $3 million. In November 2023 it introduced legislation to do this, but was unable to secure support for it from the Senate.

In January 2024, the Albanese government announced a restructuring of the "Stage Three" tax cuts that had been passed by the previous government but had not yet come into effect. The Albanese government's restructuring gave greater tax benefits to those earning under $150,000 whilst reducing the original tax cut for higher earners. The Coalition criticised Albanese for breaking a promise not to change the cuts and initially suggested they would not support it, but did eventually support the legislation's passage in February 2024. The modified tax cuts came into effect on 1 July 2024.

On 27 March 2025, as part of its fourth budget, the Albanese government legislated a further tax cut that Chalmers called "modest but meaningful". This tax cut will reduce the 16% rate for the lowest tax bracket ($18,201 and $45,000) for all taxpayers, down to 15% on 1 July 2026 and then to 14% on 1 July 2027.

==== Budgets ====
Early in the government's term, Treasurer Chalmers confirmed that the new government would hand down a revised budget in October 2022. In the lead up to the October budget, Chalmers and Gallagher launched an audit to highlight any waste left behind by the previous government. Secretary of the Department of Treasury Steven Kennedy noted that the budget needed to be brought under control and that the tax system needed to be made fit for use. On 25 October 2022, Chalmers handed down a revised budget — the first under the Albanese government. The budget forecast that inflation would peak at 7.75% at the end of the year. The budget also took steps to fund the government's election promises largely by using funding earmarked by the former government which had not yet been spent.

In May 2023, Chalmers handed down the government's second budget. The budget delivered a surplus of $22.1 billion (equivalent to 0.9% of Australia's GDP), which was well above the government's forecasted surplus of $4.3 billion; this was Australia's first budget surplus in 15 years, and the largest ever Australian budget surplus. In May 2024, Chalmers handed down the government's third budget. This budget delivered a surplus of $9.3 billion, making it the first consecutive surplus in an Australian federal budget since 2007–08. In May 2025, Chalmers handed down the government's fourth budget.

==== "Future Made in Australia" manufacturing policy ====
In April 2024, Prime Minister Albanese announced a major industrial policy called "Future Made in Australia", which seeks to promote Australian manufacturing in sustainable energy. As part of the policy, the government's third budget contained $22.7 billion over a decade in support of domestic green hydrogen, solar-panel manufacturing, and mining of critical minerals. This includes a $1 billion "Solar Sunshot" program to support solar panel manufacturing in Australia, and a $566 million "Resourcing Australia's Prosperity" initiative for geomapping for mining resources. In July 2024, the Albanese government introduced legislation to give further effect to the policy, which passed the Parliament in November 2024. As part of the Parliamentary negotiations, $500 million for the electrification of social housing was added to the scheme.

=== Industrial relations and employment ===
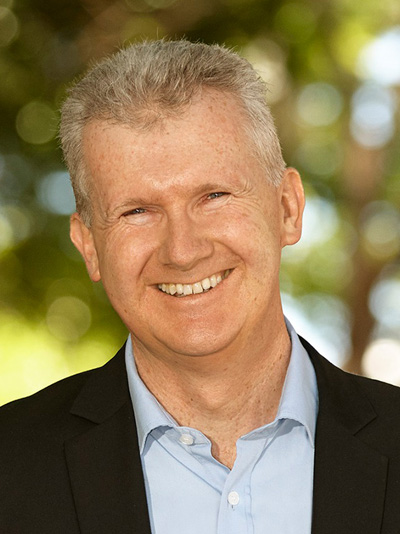
Tony Burke, Minister for Employment from 2022 to 2024 and current Leader of the House

Tony Burke served as Minister for Employment from 2022 to 2024, succeeded by Senator Murray Watt after a July 2024 reshuffle of Cabinet. On 3 June 2022, Minister Burke confirmed that the government had made a formal submission to the Fair Work Commission in support of an increase to the minimum wage. Subsequently, on 15 June 2022, the Fair Work Commission announced that the minimum wage would be raised by 5.2%. In September 2022, in fulfilment of a campaign promise, Albanese held a "Jobs and Skills Summit" with unions and business leaders. It resulted in the government agreeing to 36 initiatives involving education, housing, workplace relations, and immigration.

On 28 November 2022, the government passed new workplace harassment laws through the Parliament. These laws implement the recommendation of the Respect@Work Report to create a positive duty requiring employers to implement measures to prevent sexual harassment, sex discrimination, and victimisation. On 2 December 2022, the government passed its Secure Jobs, Better Pay law through the Parliament. The new law allows unions to negotiate multi-employer pay deals in an effort to secure wage increases across particular sectors such as child care and aged care. The law also aims to close the gender pay gap by prohibiting pay secrecy employment clauses and secures the right of workers to seek flexible working arrangements.

Throughout 2023, the Albanese government attempted to pass additional industrial relations reforms through Parliament, dubbed the Closing Loopholes bill, which aimed to ensure temporary workers employed through labour hire were paid the same wage as regular workers, criminalise wage theft, and make companies responsible for industrial manslaughter, among other changes. Despite opposition from the Liberal Party and business lobbies, the first part of the bill was passed by the Senate on 7 December 2023. The second tranche of legislation, which introduced minimum standards for gig workers, was passed on 8 February 2024.

On 13 December 2023, Australian federal and state workplace ministers agreed to ban the use, supply, and manufacturing of engineered stone from 1 July 2024. This initiative followed a Safe Work Australia report that found the rates of silicosis and silica-related diseases had risen substantially particularly among engineered stone workers. In mid-January 2024, Burke declined to intervene in an industrial dispute between the Australian Maritime Officers Union and DP World but criticised the latter for allegedly acting in "bad faith". In its May 2024 budget, the government announced that superannuation would be added to Commonwealth-funded paid parental leave from 1 July 2025. In late August 2024, the federal government's right to disconnect laws came into effect. This allows employees to ignore calls or messages from their employers outside of work hours, except where such refusal is unreasonable.

=== Immigration ===
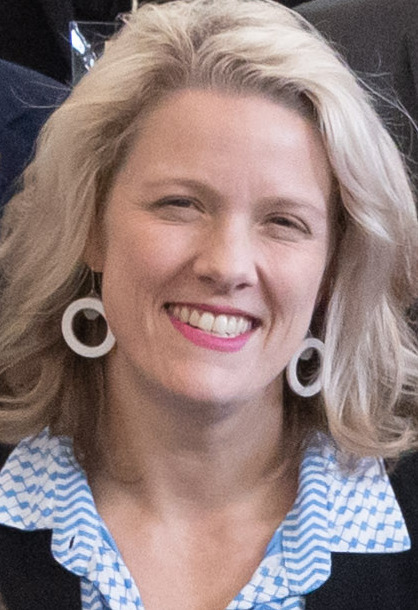
Clare O'Neil, Minister for Home Affairs from 2022 to 2024

Clare O'Neil was appointed Minister for Home Affairs. Prior to her appointment, on 27 May 2022, interim Minister Jim Chalmers announced that he had exercised his power to allow the Murugappan family to return home to Biloela on bridging visas. In September 2022, the Albanese government increased the permanent migration intake from 160,000 to a record 195,000 a year. Net overseas migration reached 536,000 in the 2022–23 financial year, the highest in Australian history, which the Albanese government attributed to being a "catch-up" on the migration decrease during the COVID-19 border closures in Australia. Net overseas migration then decreased to 446,000 in the 2023–24 financial year, and is estimated to be 340,000 over the 2024–25 financial year. Net permanent and long-term arrivals in the 12 months to May 2025 were 447,620.

In October 2022, the Albanese government repatriated four Australian-citizen ISIS brides and their 13 children from Syria to western Sydney, which some local mayors and representative Dai Le criticised. As of June 2024, the government has not repatriated any further ISIS brides or their children. In the leadup to the 2022 election, Labor promised that it would abolish temporary protection visas. It did so by early 2023, allowing 19,000 asylum seekers who had been living in Australia for a decade to gain permanent residency.

In November 2023, the High Court held that indefinite immigration detention is unlawful. In response to this ruling and demands from those indefinitely detained, the Albanese government began releasing people clearly impacted by the case. Within a week, 80 people were released, with Giles saying that all are on visa conditions including reporting. The Albanese government is seeking to clarify if the government must release people from immigration detention if they have refused to cooperate with attempts to deport them. The government is seeking to enact legislation that will jail immigration detainees and unlawful non-citizens for a minimum of one year if they do not cooperate with attempts to deport them. In December 2023, the Albanese government released its ten-year migration strategy which includes increasing minimum English language requirements for international students and tightening visa processes for migrant workers.

According to some critics, the housing crisis in Australia was exacerbated by the immigration policies of the Albanese government.

==== International student migration ====
In January 2024, the government signalled changes that would make it easier for international students to settle permanently in Australia. However, on 1 July 2024, the government enacted policy changes intended to limit the available of visas for international student graduates. These changes included excluding students aged over 35 years from the Temporary Graduate visa scheme, reducing the time students are permitted to remain and work in Australia after completing their tertiary studies, increasing financial capacity requirements, and increasing English language requirements.

On 1 July 2024, the government announced plans to increase the fee for international student visas from $710 to $1600. Representatives from the university sector expressed concern that the increased fee would deter international students from studying in Australia. On 27 August 2024, the Australian Government announced plans to limit the number of international student tertiary enrolments to 270,000, with 145,000 enrolments allocated to university enrolments. On 6 September 2024, the government announced the maximum number of student enrolments allocated to each Australian university. In response to the Albanese Government's announcement, the Allen government in Victoria voiced concerns that the change could cost the Victorian economy $5.9 billion by 2027. During a senate inquiry into the proposed legislation, representatives from the Australian university sector voiced similar concerns about the economic impact of the policy, and the consequent effects on long term tertiary education outcomes for both international and domestic students.

=== Health ===
Mark Butler was appointed Health Minister. During the 2022 election campaign, Labor committed $135 million to fund 50 bulk-billed urgent care clinics, a policy designed to ease pressure on hospital emergency wards. By the start of 2024, 58 clinics had opened across every state and territory of Australia. Over the first six months of operation, more than 130,000 patients were treated for non-life-threatening medical emergencies.

==== Pharmaceutical Benefits Scheme ====
In October 2022, the government's cheaper medications bill passed the parliament. The new law reduced the cost of PBS medications by 29% and reduced the co-payment.

==== Aged care ====
The first bill to pass the new Parliament was one responding to the 17 recommendations of the Aged Care Royal Commission. The legislation amended the aged care funding model and introduces new reporting and transparency requirements. The government also introduced a bill in the first sitting of the new parliament seeking to implement its election commitment to ensure that there is a nurse in nursing homes at all times. This bill was passed by the Parliament on 27 October 2022. The government entered submissions to the Fair Work Commission supporting the case for a wage increase in the aged care industry and committed to funding any such increase. The Commission ordered a 15% increase and the government is expected to enter submissions related to the timing and implementation of this.

==== NDIS ====
In mid-August 2022, the federal government announced that providers in the National Disability Insurance Scheme would be scrutinised for fraud. The government also confirmed the establishment of a multiagency task force to look into this issue. On 7 July 2024, the NDIS Minister Bill Shorten confirmed that sex work would no longer be funded through the NDIS under planned reforms. On 5 September 2024, Shorten confirmed that he would retire from politics and his ministerial portfolio in February 2025 in order to take up the position as vice-chancellor of the University of Canberra.

==== Immunisation ====
On 10 November 2024, health minister Mark Butler announced that pregnant women and newborn babies would have access to free respiratory syncytial virus vaccines before winter 2025 under the National Immunisation Program. In addition, babies would be eligible for national access to monoclonal antibody.

==== Medicare ====
On 22 February 2025, Albanese announced that the government would invest $8.5 billion in Medicare services including $18 million in subsidised general practitioner's visits, 400 nursing scholarships and general practitioner training programs for 2,000 doctors.

==== COVID-19 pandemic ====
On 30 June 2022, Butler ordered an inquiry into Australia's COVID-19 vaccine supplies, future variant jabs and how the rollout was caught short at the height of the pandemic. The review will also examine the deals entered into by the former Morrison government to purchase vaccines and therapeutic treatments. Pandemic leave payments and access to free rapid antigen tests for concession card holders expired on 1 July 2022. The new government initially did not take steps to extend these programs, but reinstated them on 16 July 2022. On 3 July 2022, Butler announced that from 12:01 am on 6 July 2022 changes to the Biosecurity Act would come into effect which provide that persons seeking to visit Australia would no longer have to declare their COVID-19 vaccination status.

On 7 July 2022, Butler confirmed that persons aged over 30 would be eligible to receive a fourth COVID-19 vaccine dose from 11 July 2022. The government altered rules governing isolation periods so that persons infected with the virus only need isolate for 5 days from 9 September 2022. Albanese announced on 30 September that a mandatory isolation period would no longer apply at all for persons infected with COVID-19. On 21 September 2023, Albanese announced an independent inquiry into the federal government's handling of the COVID-19 pandemic in Australia, led by former public servant Robyn Kruk, infectious diseases expert Catherine Bennett and economist Angela Jackson. The royal inquiry drew criticism from the Australian Medical Association and the Human Rights Commissioner for excluding state and territorial governments from its scope.

=== Energy and climate change ===
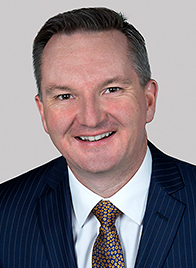
Chris Bowen, current Minister for Climate Change and Energy

Chris Bowen was appointed Minister for Climate Change and Energy in the Albanese ministry. On 16 June 2022, Bowen and Albanese submitted a new Nationally Determined Contribution to the United Nations which formally committed Australia to reducing carbon emissions by 43% on 2005 levels. This represented an increase from the 26–28% reduction target submitted by the Abbott government. The Albanese government also codified the new reduction target in legislation, which passed with support from the Greens and crossbench senators.

In late 2022, the Albanese government announced reforms to the "safeguard mechanism", which requires Australia's largest carbon emitters to keep their emissions under a "baseline limit", either by reducing emissions or purchasing carbon credits. The scheme was introduced by the Turnbull government in 2016, but failed to reduce emissions as the rules were often left unenforced. However, the Albanese amendments were met by opposition from the Australian Greens, whose support was crucial in the Senate; Greens leader Adam Bandt argued that the reforms did not go far enough. The two parties reached an agreement on 27 March 2023, with the Greens negotiating a "hard cap" on emissions that cannot be offset by carbon credits. The bill was passed on 30 March 2023, marking the most significant piece of climate change legislation passed through the Australian Parliament since 2011's Clean Energy Act.

In late 2023, Australia re-joined the United Nations' Green Climate Fund, from which the previous Morrison government had withdrawn in 2018. As part of re-joining, the Albanese government committed $150 million in climate finance to Pacific island countries. In late March 2024, Albanese along with Bowen and industry minister Ed Husic travelled to the former Liddell Power Station in the Hunter Valley to announce a $1 billion solar panel program. The visit later attracted criticism and accusations of hypocrisy after it was revealed that the ministers had travelled into the area on two separate private jets. In response to criticism, Bowen said that the Royal Australian Air Force had been responsible for their travel arrangements.

==== Energy prices ====
In April 2022, shortly before the Albanese government took office, the independent Australian Energy Regulator (AER) determined that the retail electricity pricing cap would be lifted on 1 July 2022 in response to higher wholesale prices. Amidst the global surge in energy prices, Australia entered into an energy crisis marked by significantly increased power prices. Bowen convened a meeting with his state and territory counterparts on 8 June 2022. The ministers agreed to expedite work on a capacity mechanism which will require the AER to pay retailers to maintain excess capacity.

On 9 December 2022, Albanese announced that National Cabinet had agreed to a co-ordinated plan to introduce temporary caps on gas and coal prices. The Bill passed the federal Parliament on 15 December 2022, creating a 12-month cap on energy prices and a $1.5 billion relief package for households and businesses. In May 2024, as part of the Albanese government's third budget, every Australian household received a $300 credit on their energy bill via four quarterly instalments of $75. In May 2025, as part of its fourth budget, the government added a further $150 credit by extending the instalments by another two quarters.

==== Electric vehicles ====
In July 2022, the Albanese government introduced a bill to exempt certain electric vehicles from fringe benefits tax. This passed Parliament in November 2022. In March 2024, the Albanese government introduced a bill to apply a vehicle emission standard to new vehicles sold in Australia from 1 July 2025. The Parliament passed this New Vehicle Efficiency Standard in May 2024. Albanese said that electric vehicles "can do anything that petrol vehicles can do, they'll do it in a way which is more efficient, that boosts productivity, that saves money, as well as driving down emissions".

=== Environment ===
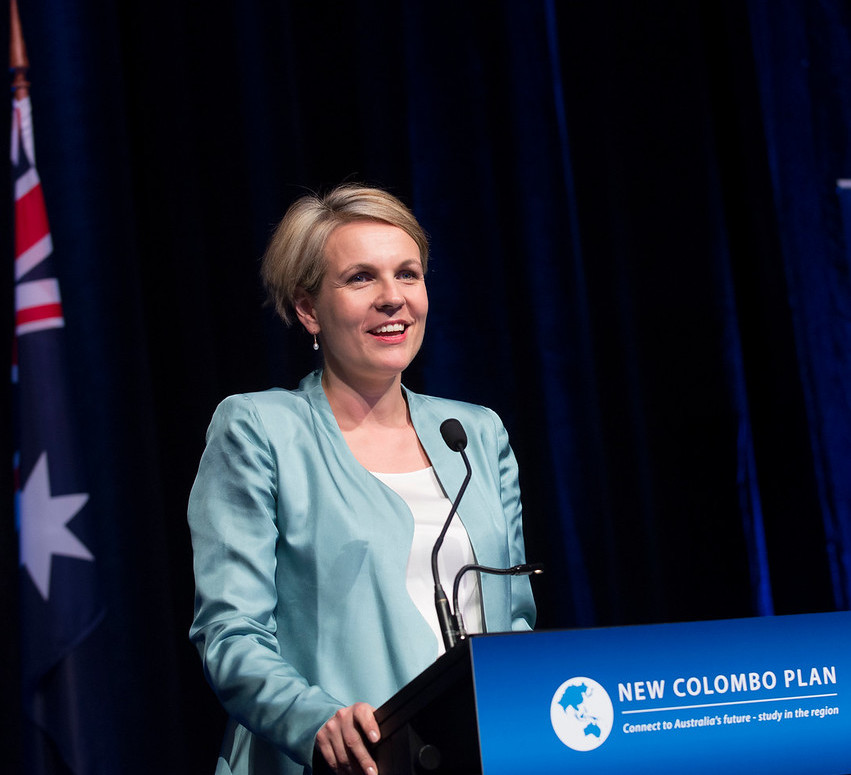
Tanya Plibersek, current Minister for the Environment and Water, speaking in late 2013

Tanya Plibersek was appointed Minister for the Environment and Water. Plibersek attended the UN ocean conference in Lisbon on 26 June 2022 where she announced five new blue carbon projects which are understood to include assistance for developing nations to safeguard the health of their oceans. On 19 July 2022, Plibersek released the State of the Environment Report which had been handed to the previous government in December 2021. The Report provided that every category of the Australian environment – apart from urban environments – was now in a poor and deteriorating state. In response, Plibersek announced that the government would adopt a new target of protecting 30% of the Australian environment and promised stronger environmental protection legislation to be introduced in 2023.

On 8 December 2022, Plibersek announced that the government would commit to a reform of federal environmental laws, in response to an independent review first submitted to the Morrison government in 2020. The reform would include the creation of a federal Environment Protection Agency (EPA) which would impose legally binding environmental standards and oversee decision-making processes of the states and territories, as well as increased restrictions to native logging and the establishment of a "traffic light" rating system where some areas could be designated as having a high conservation value. The government planned to introduce legislation to Parliament before the end of 2023. On 29 May 2024, Plibersek introduced to Parliament a modified version of the reforms. In mid-May 2024, the Federal Court of Australia ruled Plibersek in her capacity as federal environment minister did not need to consider the environmental impacts of emissions when approving gas or coal projects.

==== Expansion of marine parks ====
On 5 June 2023, Plibersek announced that the government would triple the size of the Macquarie Island Marine Park, with the vast majority of the park being completely closed to fishing, mining, and other extractive activities. This expansion came into effect on 1 July 2023. On 8 October 2024, Plibersek announced that the government would quadruple the size of the Heard and McDonald Islands Marine Park, representing an increase of 310,000 square kilometres in protected area of restricted fishing. This expansion came into effect on 24 January 2025 and means that over half of Australia's ocean area is under protection.

=== Indigenous affairs ===
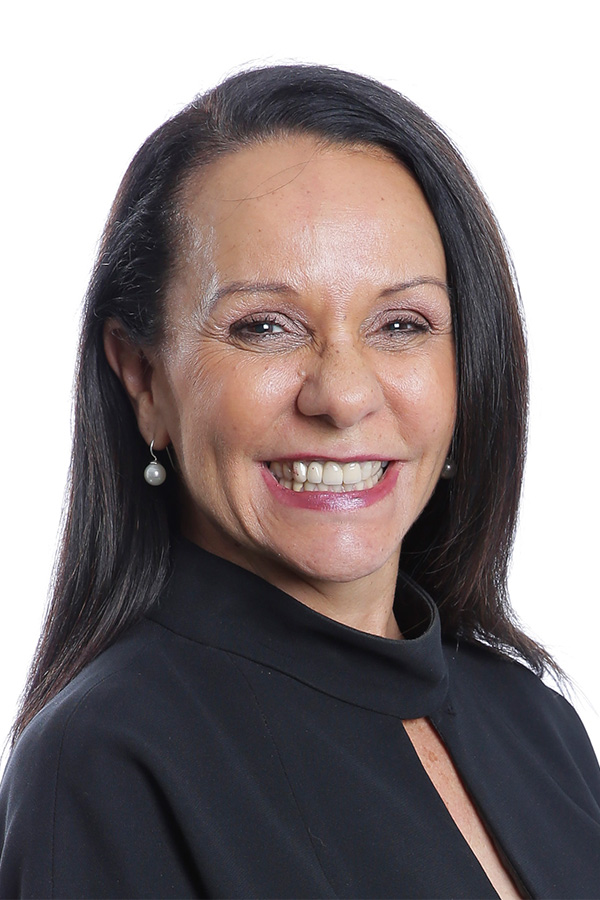
Linda Burney, Minister for Indigenous Australians from 2022 to 2024

At Albanese's first press conference as Prime Minister, the podium flags in the blue room at Parliament were changed to include Indigenous and Torres Strait Islander flags in addition to the Australian flag. Upon the opening of the new Parliament, both flags began to be displayed in the House of Representatives and Senate chambers. Linda Burney was sworn in as Minister for Indigenous Australians on 1 June 2022. She was the first Indigenous woman to serve in the role. In July 2024, following Minister Burney's retirement from the Cabinet, her Assistant Minister Malarndirri McCarthy became the new Minister for Indigenous Australians. Disparity in health and socio-economic outcomes between First Nations peoples and non-Indigenous, remained an issue under the Albanese Government. In February 2024, data released by the Australian Productivity Commission indicating that only five of 19 target health and socioeconomic outcomes were on track to reach parity by the intended 2031 deadline.

==== Uluru Statement from the Heart ====
When declaring victory on election night, Albanese confirmed that his government was committed to implementing the Uluru Statement from the Heart in full within its first term. On 30 July 2022, Albanese attended the Garma Festival of Traditional Cultures, where he announced the proposed question the government intended to put to a referendum for the inclusion of an Indigenous Voice to Parliament in the Australian Constitution: "Do you support an alteration to the Constitution that establishes an Aboriginal and Torres Strait Islander Voice?"

On 3 February 2023, all first ministers signed a statement of intent through the National Cabinet committing to support constitutional recognition of a Voice to Parliament. A referendum on an Indigenous Voice to Parliament was held on the 14 October 2023 and was rejected nationally. The Yes23 campaign co-chair Rachel Perkins called for a week of silence "to grieve this outcome and reflect on its meaning and significance". On 3 August 2024, Albanese announced his government no longer intended to pursue Truth and Treaty through the establishment of a formal Makaratta Commission.

=== Internet and social media ===
==== Minimum age for social media access ====
In May 2024, the federal government allocated $6.5 million from the 2024 Australian federal budget to a pilot age verification scheme meant to protect children from accessing pornography and other harmful digital content in response to a sharp rise in domestic violence nationally. On 10 September 2024, Albanese and Minister for Communications Michelle Rowland confirmed that the federal government would introduce legislation to enforce a minimum age for access to social media and other relevant digital platforms. Albanese said that the legislation was intended to safeguard the safety and mental and physical health of young people, while Rowland said that the proposed legislation would hold big tech to account for harmful online environments and social media addiction among children. The federal government's announcement followed South Australia's plan to restrict social media access to people aged 14 and above, and the Coalition's promise to restrict social media access to people aged under 16 if it won the 2025 Australian federal election.

In response, the Australian Association of Psychologists director Carly Dober described the proposal as a "bandaid response to a very complicated and deeply entrenched issue". The Australian Internet regulator, the eSafety Commissioner, who expressed concern that a social media ban would exclude young people from "meaningful" digital engagement and access to critical support. By contrast, the 36Months initiative has supported the social media age limit on the grounds that excessive social media usage was "rewiring young brains" and causing an "epidemic of mental illness".

On 7 November 2024, Albanese confirmed that the minimum age would be 16 and would not include exemptions for young people who already have social media accounts or those with parental consent. On 21 November, the Albanese government introduced the legislation with proposed fines of up to A$49.5 million (US$32 million) on social media platforms for systemic breaches. The proposed law would affect Facebook, Instagram, TikTok, X (formerly Twitter) and Snapchat. However, Albanese confirmed that children would still have access to messaging, online gaming, and health and education-related services including the youth mental health platform Headspace, Google Classroom and YouTube, Messenger Kids, WhatsApp and Kids Helpline. On 29 November 2024, the Australian Parliament passed the legislation with support from the Coalition but opposition from the Australian Greens. In response, tech companies Meta Platforms, TikTok and Google criticised the age verification legislation but indicated they would work with the government to implement the legislation over the next 12 months.

On 26 November 2025, the Digital Freedom Project announced it would commence legal action in the High Court against the new laws, saying they violate the implied right to political communication in the Constitution.

==== Social media regulation ====
Following the 2024 Wakeley church stabbing on 15 April 2024, the federal government ordered Meta Platforms and X (formerly Twitter) to remove offensive content relating to the attack within 24 hours or face fines. In response, X announced it would challenge the federal government's decision in court, with its owner Elon Musk accusing the government of censorship. The Federal Court of Australia said that it was unreasonable for the eSafety Commission to require X to remove access to the video globally and noted that a block would be ignored by other countries. The eSafety Commissioner Julie Inman Grant dropped the Federal Court case on 5 June 2024, but stated that she would continue legal action in the Administrative Appeals Tribunal.

On 12 September 2024, the federal government introduced legislation to combat social media misinformation. It would allow the Australian Communications and Media Authority (ACMA) to require social media platforms to set internal industry standards around serious harm to election integrity, public health, incitement of hatred and violence, and disruption of key infrastructure or emergency services. The ACMA would have the power to fine social media companies up to five percent of their annual revenue for non-compliance. In response, X's owner Musk denounced the Australian government as "fascists". Government Services Minister Bill Shorten accused Musk of being disingenuous about free speech, stating, "When it's in its commercial interests, he [Elon Musk] is the champion of free speech and when he doesn't like it... he's going to shut it all down." On 25 November 2024, the Albanese government withdrew the proposed legislation amid criticism over its impact on free speech.

==== Ban on TikTok on government devices ====
On 4 April 2023, the Albanese government banned the video streaming app TikTok on all government devices, including the mobile phones of politicians. Prior to the Australian federal government's ban, 68 federal agencies had banned TikTok on work-related mobile devices by early March 2023. The federal government subsequently began a review of TikTok on 21 March 2023.

==== Ban on doxxing and non-consensual deepfake pornography ====
In June 2024, the Albanese government introduced legislation to criminalise the creation and sharing of non-consensual deepfake pornography. The legislation passed the Parliament two months later with broad political support. In November 2024, the Albanese government passed legislation that criminalised doxxing.

=== Education ===
Jason Clare was appointed Minister for Education. On 17 June 2022, Clare confirmed that the Albanese government intends to make changes which give schools a choice of whether to hire a religious or secular pastoral care worker through the National School Chaplaincy Programme. Clare announced an Australian Universities Accord with the terms of reference covering funding, affordability, employment conditions for staff, and how universities and TAFEs can work together. The Accord's final report is due to be handed down in December 2023. In November 2024, the Albanese government passed legislation to change the calculation of annual indexation on student university debts. Previously it was based on the consumer price index (CPI), with the change making it determined by what is lower between the CPI or the wage price index (wage growth). The change in indexation removed an estimated $3 billion in Australian student debt loans.

The 10-year anniversary of the Gonski report in May 2022 led to criticism of successive state governments failure to implement its recommendations. By the late March 2025 all states and territories had signed on to the new school funding agreement with the Albanese government lifting federal funding of public schools to 25 per cent from 20 per cent, under the Better and Fairer Schools Agreement (BFSA). Under the BFSA, states are required to increase their funding of public schools to 75 per cent of the minimum amount recommended by the 2012 Gonski Report and Gonski 2.0, per the Schooling Resource Standard proposed by panel chair David Gonski. This means that they will be fully funded according to the Gonski model.

==== Childcare ====
In November 2022, the parliament passed the government's cheaper childcare laws. The new laws commenced operation in July 2023 and increased the childcare subsidy from 85% to 90% for families on an income below $80,000.

=== Housing ===
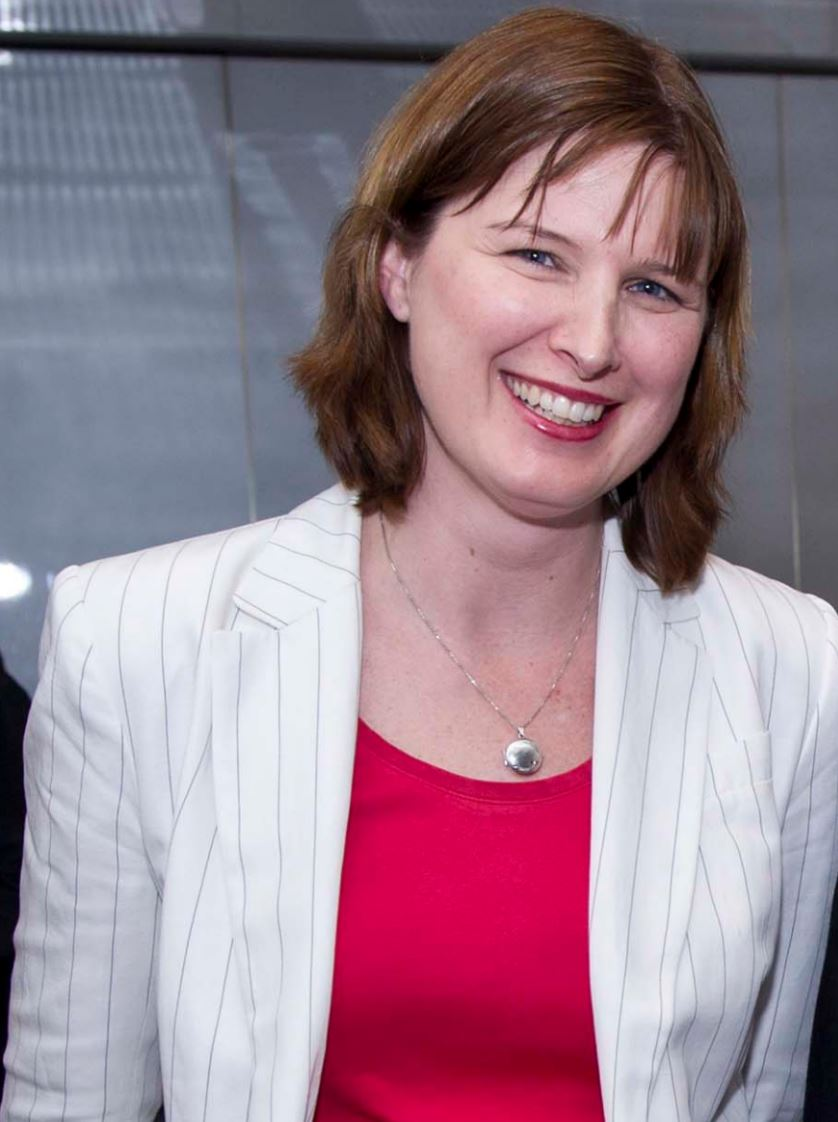
Julie Collins, current Minister for Housing

Julie Collins was appointed Minister for Housing, in the midst of a housing affordability crisis. On 1 October 2022, the government launched its Regional First Home Buyer Guarantee. The program provides a government guarantee of up to 15 per cent for eligible first home buyers, so regional Australians with a deposit of as little as 5 per cent can avoid paying lenders’ mortgage insurance. In August 2023, Albanese reached an agreement with National Cabinet to build 1.2 million houses over five years. On 13 September 2023, the government's Housing Australia Future Fund passed the Parliament. This is a $10 billion investment fund controlled by the Future Fund that is designed to build 30,000 new social and affordable homes over the following five years in a further effort to increase supply.

On 25 September 2024, the Albanese government instructed the Treasury to examine negative gearing. As a divisive wedge issue in Australian politics, changes to negative gearing rules were proposed by Labor prior to the 2019 election, in which they were defeated. Albanese had previously pledged not to modify negative gearing as Opposition Leader, leading to criticism from the Coalition and conservative media outlets for appearing to backtrack on this promise. After intense media speculation, Albanese ruled out making changes to negative gearing the next day. In November 2024, the Albanese government legislated a "help-to-buy" shared equity scheme that aims to allow up to 40,000 first-time home buyers to purchase a home with a shared contribution with the government, and a tax concession to incentivise developers to build houses specifically for the purpose of renting.

=== Welfare ===
The Albanese government announced that existing mutual obligation penalties would be expunged from people's records as the government transitioned to the Workforce Australia system for JobSeeker, saying that it was "too late" to scrap the system. A review of the Workforce Australia JobSeeker scheme will be tabled in parliament in September 2023. Legislation to end the Cashless Debit Card was passed by the House of Representatives, and will be considered by the Senate in September. Cashless Debit Card users in the Northern Territory will be transitioned back onto the BasicsCard, a Howard-era income management scheme, despite Labor promising prior to the election to end compulsory income management. A Royal Commission into the Robodebt Scheme was announced by Albanese with Letters Patent issued on 25 August 2022. The Royal Commission will be chaired by former Queensland Supreme Court Justice Catherine Holmes and is expected to conclude on 18 April 2023. The Albanese government agreed to all recommendations of the royal commission, either in full or in principle, but rejected a recommendation about the freedom of information act.

=== Justice ===
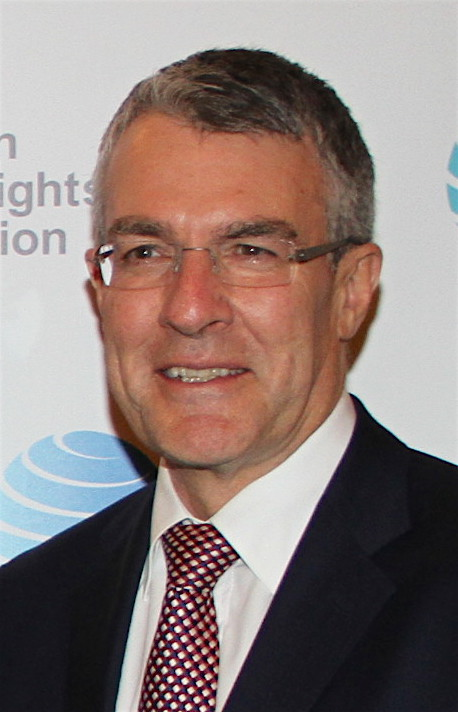
Attorney-General of Australia Mark Dreyfus in 2015

==== National Anti-Corruption Commission ====
During the election campaign, Albanese confirmed that his government would seek to establish a federal National Anti-Corruption Commission within its first year in office. On the day he was sworn in, Albanese confirmed that he had already ordered work to begin on this task. Attorney-General Mark Dreyfus said that the government's legislation would include provision for the commission to investigate pork-barrelling, as well as "serious and systemic" past corruption allegations. In September 2022, Dreyfus introduced a bill to establish a National Anti-Corruption Commission (NACC). The bill passed the Parliament on 30 November 2022 in line with the government's commitment to establish an anti-corruption commission prior to the end of 2022. The NACC came into existence on 1 July 2023.

==== Administrative Appeals Tribunal ====
On 16 December 2022, the Labor Albanese government announced that it will abolish the Administrative Appeals Tribunal (AAT) and replace it with a new body, claiming that the AAT had been "fatally compromised" by political appointments and "cronyism". On 28 May 2024, the legislation to establish the AAT's replacement, the Administrative Review Tribunal (ART), passed the Parliament. The new Tribunal commenced in October 2024.

==== Ban on public display of terrorist or Nazi symbols ====
In June 2023, the Albanese government introduced legislation to ban the public display of terrorist or Nazi symbols, including the Nazi salute. The ban passed Parliament in December 2023 and came into effect the following month.

==== Bernard Collaery prosecution ====
On 7 July 2022, Attorney-General Mark Dreyfus exercised his power under section 71 of the Judiciary Act to cease proceedings against Bernard Collaery in connection with the Australia–East Timor spying scandal.

==== Release of Julian Assange ====
In 2022, the incoming Albanese government indicated that it opposed the continued prosecution of Julian Assange but intended to pursue quiet diplomacy to prevent it. On 14 August 2023, US ambassador to Australia Caroline Kennedy flagged a potential plea deal for Assange, shortly after meeting with a group of Australian parliamentarians pushing for Assange's return. On 24 June 2024, Assange agreed to a plea bargain with the US Department, in which Assange would plead guilty to one felony count of violating the Espionage Act in exchange for immediate release. The agreement entailed the US Department of Justice seeking a sentence of 62 months, the time he had served in British prison while awaiting extradition.

After release from British prison, Assange immediately flew via charter flight – with the accompaniment of his legal representatives and the Australian high commissioner to the United Kingdom, Stephen Smith – to Saipan to the District Court for the Northern Mariana Islands. After arrival, Assange and Smith were joined by the Australian Ambassador to the United States, Kevin Rudd. Judge Ramona Villagomez Manglona accepted Assange's guilty plea and sentenced him to 62 months' time served. Assange then returned to the charter flight and flew to Canberra. Assange was required by the Australian government to repay the costs of the charter flight, requested at US$520,000, as he was not permitted to fly on commercial airlines. Upon arrival in Australia, Albanese phoned Assange. Assange's lawyer later recounted that Assange had said that Albanese had "saved his life" and that Rudd and Smith were the "diplomatic A-team".

=== Agriculture, fisheries and forestry ===
Murray Watt was sworn in as Minister for Agriculture, Fisheries and Forestry in late May 2022. Following a cabinet reshuffle in July 2024, he was succeeded by Julie Collins. On 11 May 2024, Watt announced that Western Australia's live sheep export trade would end from 1 May 2028. While RSPCA Australia welcomed the move, the policy announcement was condemned by Nationals leader David Littleproud, Western Australian opposition leader Shane Love, National Farmers' Federation CEO Tony Maher and WA Livestock president Geoff Pearson. Western Australian premier Roger Cook also criticised the Government's support package for farmers as insufficient. In late May 2024, the Western Australian agricultural sector launched a "Keep the Sheep" campaign in opposition to the federal government's decision to end live sheep exports by 2028. Campaigners staged a large protest rally in Perth, which disrupted traffic.

=== Disaster relief ===
==== 2022 floods response ====
Following the 2022 New South Wales floods in July 2022, the government announced one-off, non-means tested disaster relief payments to persons living in 29 local government areas impacted by the disaster. On 12 July 2022, Albanese announced a further $80 million to assist with clean-up efforts as well as grants for farmers, small businesses, not-for-profit organisations and local councils. Albanese also announced $36 million for a program to assess buildings and flooded properties including free demolition of those found to be unlivable. Following the 2022 south eastern Australia floods, the federal government made a one-off, non-means tested disaster recovery payment of $1,000 per eligible adult and $400 per eligible child available. Across the states suffering in the crisis, 23 local government areas were made eligible.

==== 2024 Victorian flood ====
On 10 January 2024, Albanese announced that the federal government would provide support to victims of the Murchison flooding.

==== 2024 Port Vila earthquake ====
In response to the 2024 Port Vila earthquake that occurred on 17 December 2024, the Albanese government dispatched military personnel, urban search and rescue teams, firefighters, paramedics, volunteer engineers, canine handlers and medical personnel to Port Vila, Vanuatu to assist with local rescue and recovery efforts. The Australian government also assisted with efforts to reopen Port Vila's airport. The Royal Australian Air Force evacuated 148 Australian citizens from Vanuatu.

==== Protection of cash usage ====
On 17 November 2024, the Albanese government confirmed that it would mandate that businesses be required to accept cash payments for essential items from 2026 to ensure that Australians who rely on cash including during natural disasters or digital outages can continue to make purchases.

=== Other domestic policy ===
==== Parliamentary affairs and ethics ====
Tony Burke was appointed Leader of the House in the Albanese ministry. Prior to being sworn in, Burke said that he was determined to "fix" parliamentary procedures and noted that the situation had become a "farce" during the previous Parliament. On 24 June 2022, Prime Minister Albanese decided to cut crossbench advisory staff from 4 to the pre-Coalition level of 1. This decision worsened the government's relations with the Senate crossbench and the Teal independents, with many crossbench Parliamentarians later having their staff allocations increased after making direct appeals to Albanese. On 7 July 2022, Albanese unveiled a new ministerial code of conduct which prohibited ministers from utilising blind trusts. This was in response to the blind trust used by Christian Porter under the previous government to fund personal defamation proceedings brought by him.

On 26 August 2022, Albanese and Attorney-General Mark Dreyfus announced that the government had appointed former High Court Justice Virginia Bell to lead an inquiry into the appointment of former prime minister, the Hon Scott Morrison MP, to administer departments other than the Department of Prime Minister and Cabinet and related matters". Bell found that Morrison's appointments were corrosive of public trust in government and recommended the implementation of legislation requiring the public announcement of ministerial appointments. Albanese confirmed that he would recommend that his cabinet implement all of Bell's recommendations in this regard and Burke successfully moved a motion in the House censuring Morrison on 30 November 2022, making him the first former prime minister to be censured.

==== 2026 Australian census ====
On 30 August 2024, Albanese confirmed during an interview with ABC Radio Melbourne that the 2026 Australian census would include a question relating to sexuality and gender identity, reversing an earlier statement that his government had abandoned the proposal. The following day, Albanese denied that the federal government had revised its policy regarding the inclusion of a gender identity and sexuality question in the upcoming 2026 census. On 8 September, federal treasurer Jim Chalmers confirmed that the 2026 census would include questions about sexual orientation and gender.

==== Territory rights ====
Kristy McBain was appointed Minister for the Territories. In June 2022, she confirmed that the government intended to introduce a bill to give the Northern Territory and the Australian Capital Territory the right to enact their own voluntary-assisted dying laws. However, she noted that the government had no plans to expand the number of senators representing the Australian Capital Territory despite its rapidly expanding population. On 1 December 2022, the government's bill to empower the Territories to make laws relating to voluntary-assisted dying passed the Parliament.

==== Republic ====
Matt Thistlethwaite was appointed the first Assistant Minister for the Republic on 1 June 2022. Thistlethwaite confirmed that the government's priority during its first term would be to seek constitutional recognition of Indigenous Australians, but that a transition to a republic could be on the agenda for a potential second term. Following the death of Queen Elizabeth II on 8 September 2022, Albanese reiterated that his government would not pursue becoming a republic during their first parliamentary term. In July 2024, the role of Assistant Minister for the Republic was abolished.

Albanese later confirmed a republic referendum will not be held during his prime ministership.

==== Australia Day ====
On 16 December 2022, the Albanese government removed a Morrison government requirement for local councils to hold citizenship ceremonies on 26 January, Australia Day. On 18 January 2023, the Albanese government removed a Morrison government ban on federal public servants working on Australia Day.

==== Culture ====
On 30 January 2023, Albanese unveiled a new national cultural policy "Revive" with $286 million in funding over four years, labelled the most significant investment in Australian culture since the Keating government, with a focus on literature, music, cinema and television, and First Nations language and culture.

==== Gender equity in sports ====
In early September 2024, the Albanese government launched its National Gender Equity in Sports Governance Policy to boost the representation of women in governance and leadership positions in Australian sports by creating a financial initiative for sporting bodies to make their boards more equal. Under the policy, national and state-level sporting bodies across Australia must have an equal split of men and women on their boards by 1 July 2027 or risk having their funding suspended. This policy was developed in collaboration by the Albanese government, the Australian Sports Commission (ASC), and the various State and Territory Agencies for Sport and Recreation.

=== Foreign affairs, trade and defence ===
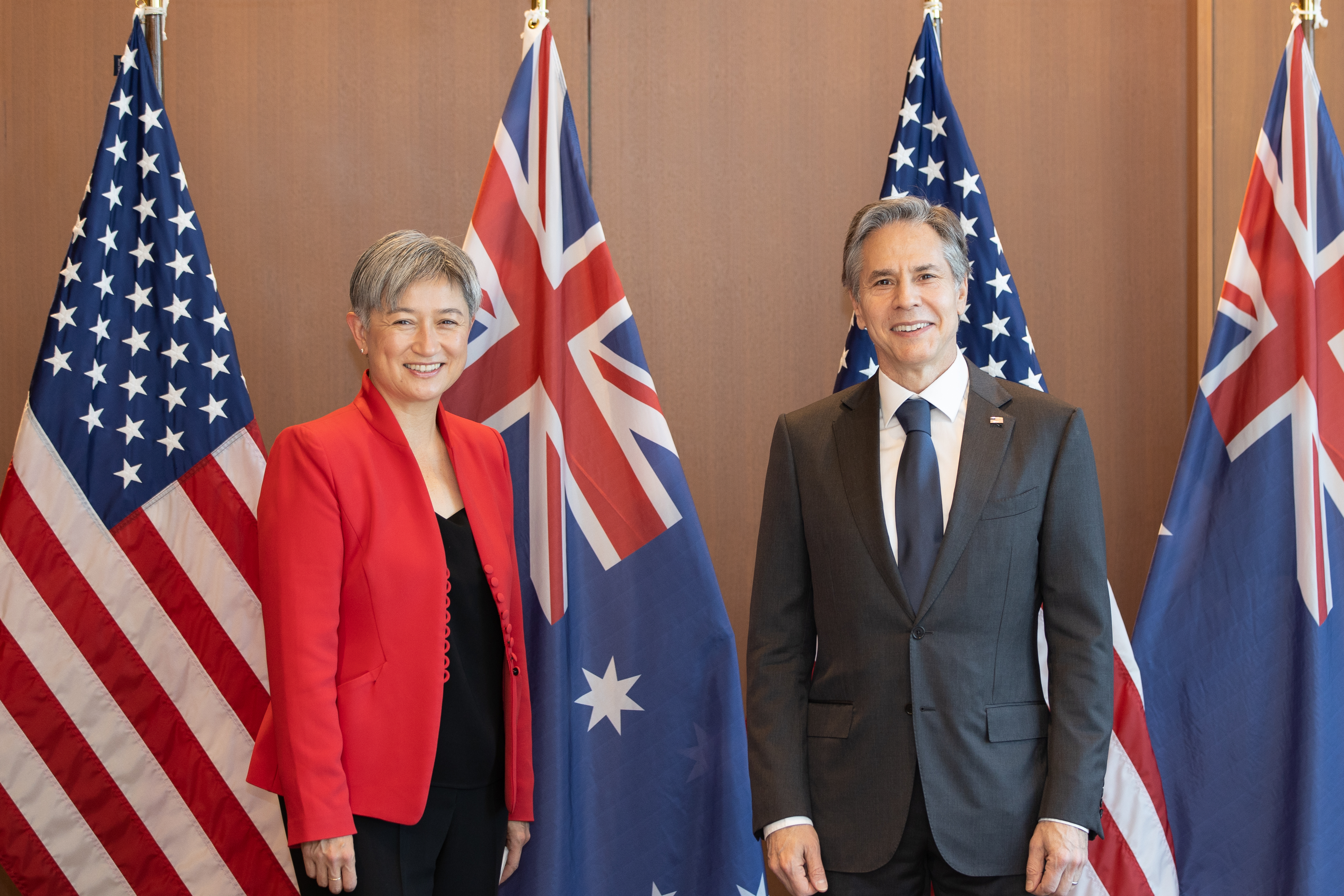
Penny Wong and Antony Blinken at the Quadrilateral Security Dialogue meeting

Penny Wong was sworn in as Minister for Foreign Affairs on 23 May 2022 as part of the interim Albanese ministry. The new Prime Minister and Minister flew to Tokyo almost immediately after being sworn in to attend a Quadrilateral Security Dialogue meeting with fellow world leaders United States president Joe Biden, Indian prime minister Narendra Modi and Japanese prime minister Fumio Kishida. At the meeting, Albanese and Wong confirmed that the new government intended to make additional action on climate change a key part of Australia's foreign policy moving forward.

In May 2024, Radio New Zealand reported that the Albanese government had slightly increased Australia's foreign aid budget by four percent, bringing its total 2024–2025 aid to A$4.961 billion budget. In August 2023, the Government had released its new international development strategy, which promised new country, gender, disability and humanitarian aid strategies.

==== China ====
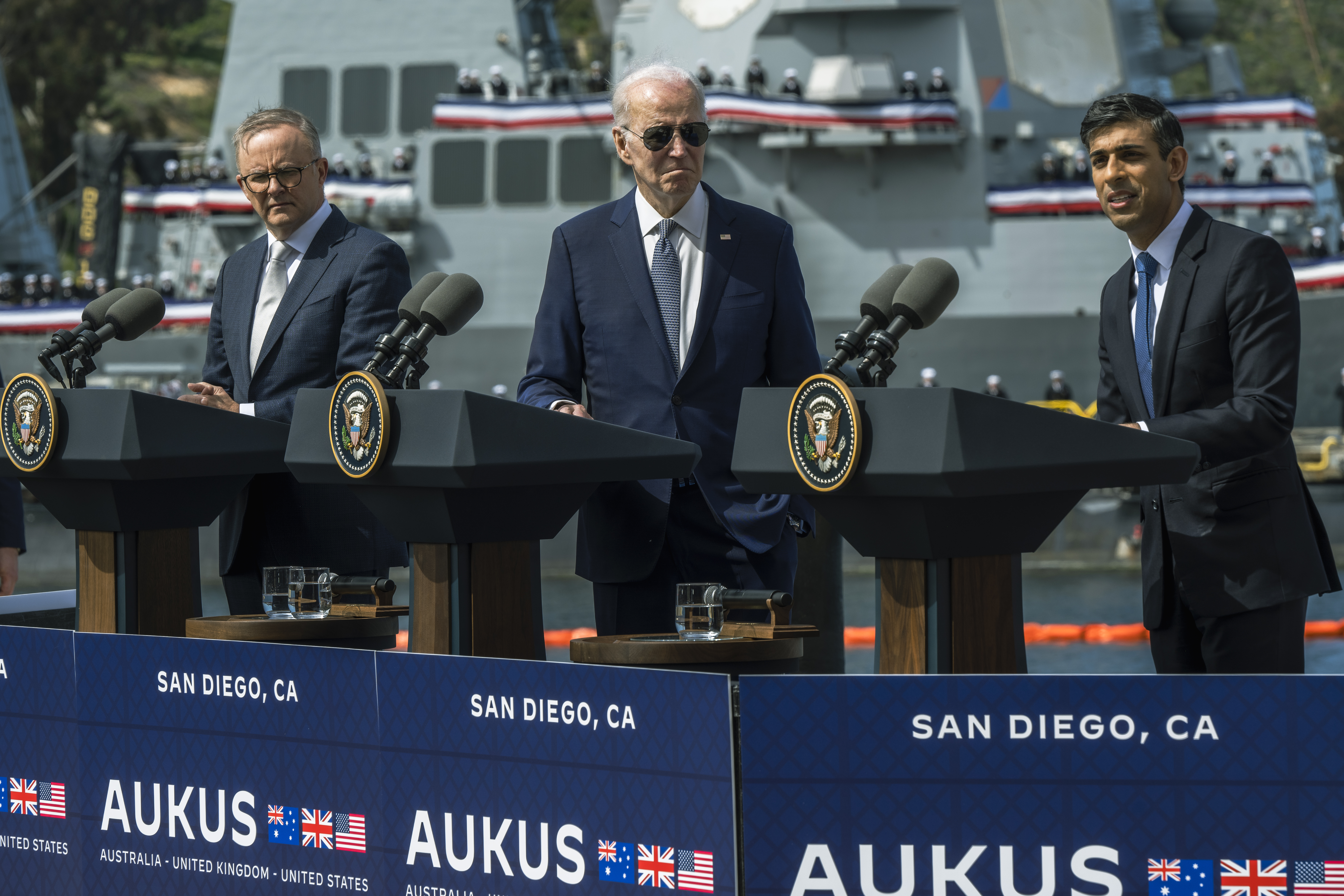
Albanese, US president Joe Biden, and British prime minister Rishi Sunak at the AUKUS meeting in San Diego in 2023

On 12 June 2022, Deputy Prime Minister and Defence Minister Richard Marles held a meeting with Chinese Defence Minister Wei Fenghe at the Shangri-La Dialogue in Singapore. It was the highest-level contact between Australia and China in almost three years following a deterioration in Australia-China relations under the previous Morrison government. The two ministers discussed an incident involving the Chinese interception of a Royal Australian Air Force Boeing P-8 Poseidon over the South China Sea and political developments in the Pacific Islands. Earlier, Marles reiterated his government's commitment to pursuing a "productive relationship" with China while advancing its own national interests and regional security within a rules-based system. In response to Chinese concerns that AUKUS was a "mini-NATO", Marles stated that AUKUS was not an alliance similar to NATO but rather focused on the "sharing and development of capabilities" between Australia, the United Kingdom, and United States.

In November 2022, Albanese held a bilateral meeting with General Secretary of the Chinese Communist Party Xi Jinping, bringing an end to the longest diplomatic freeze in 50 years between Australia and China. In December 2022, Australian foreign minister Penny Wong visited China, the first Australian minister to visit the country since 2019, where she met Chinese foreign minister Wang Yi. In early 2023, China ended its unofficial ban on imports of Australian coal, with all restrictions reportedly being lifted by 14 March. On 11 April the countries announced that they reached an agreement over disputes over China's barley imports from Australia, with China agreeing to review its tariffs in exchange for Australia suspending a case against China in the World Trade Organization WTO. These developments were followed by Chinese Vice Foreign Minister Ma Zhaoxu's visit to Australia in mid-April 2023 and Australia Minister for Trade and Tourism Don Farrell's visit to Beijing, which marked the first visits by senior Chinese and Australian visits since 2017 and 2019 respectively. Chinese ambassador to Australia Xiao Qian announced on 18 May that China would allow imports of Australian timber, which was suspended in 2020. This was followed by the ending of China's 80% tariff on Australian barley in early August 2023 and its tariffs on Australian wine in March 2024.

In September 2023, the Australian and Chinese governments held a high-level dialogue in Beijing, the first in three years, with former trade minister Craig Emerson leading the Australian delegation, while China was represented by former foreign minister Li Zhaoxing. Later that month Albanese met with Chinese premier Li Qiang on the sidelines of the East Asia Summit held in Jakarta. On 11 October 2023, Australian journalist Cheng Lei, a former CGTN news anchor who was detained in September 2020, was released and returned to Australia. During 4–7 November 2023, Albanese visited Shanghai and Beijing, becoming the first Australian prime minister to visit China in seven years. The trip, described as an effort to improve Australian-Chinese bilateral relations, coincided with the 50th anniversary of Prime Minister Gough Whitlam's first state visit to China. During the trip he gave a speech at the China International Import Expo, and met with Premier Li Qiang and CCP General Secretary Xi Jinping.

In mid-June 2024 Albanese hosted Chinese Premier Li Qiang during his state visit to Australia. China agreed to extend visa-free access to Australians visiting China for up to 15 days. The two governments also agreed to provide reciprocal five-year multiple entry visas for tourism, business and visiting family members. In addition, the two governments agreed to hold talks on improving bilateral military relations to avoid incidents such as the 2023 sonar attack on divers from HMAS Toowoomba. Despite a largely productive visit, an incident occurred when Chinese officials attempted to obstruct Cheng Lei, who had since become a Sky News Australia journalist. Despite the improving of Australian-Chinese bilateral relations during the Albanese government, flashpoints have included Australia's continuation of the AUKUS submarine deal, a sonar attack on Royal Australian Navy divers from HMAS Toowoomba by the Chinese destroyer Ningbo near Japan in November 2023, Australia's agreement to brief New Zealand about AUKUS Pillar 2 developments in February 2024, the targeting of 20 Australian lawmakers involved in the Inter-Parliamentary Alliance on China (IPAC) by Chinese spies (APT31) in April 2024, and a confrontation between a Chinese Air Force jet and Australian military helicopter near North Korea in May 2024.

On 13 February 2025, the Australian Defence Department lodged a formal complaint with the People's Liberation Army following an incident in the South China Sea on 11 February in which a Chinese fighter jet released flares within 30 metres of an RAAF P-8 Poseidon aircraft. On 20 February, the Australian and New Zealand Defence Ministers Marles and Judith Collins confirmed that the Australian and New Zealand militaries were monitoring three Chinese warships that were sailing through Australia's exclusive economic zone near Sydney. In response to Chinese naval live-fire exercises disrupting international flights in the Tasman Sea, Foreign Minister Wong met with Director of the Office of the Central Foreign Affairs Commission Wang Yi at the G20 summit in South Africa to raise Australian concerns about Chinese naval activities near Australia. On 10 April 2025, Albanese and Marles declined Chinese Ambassador to Australia Xiao Qian's invitation for Australia to join Beijing in opposing US president Donald Trump's international tariffs. Albanese said that "Australians would speak for ourselves" while Marles said that Australia "would not be holding China's hand".

==== Europe ====
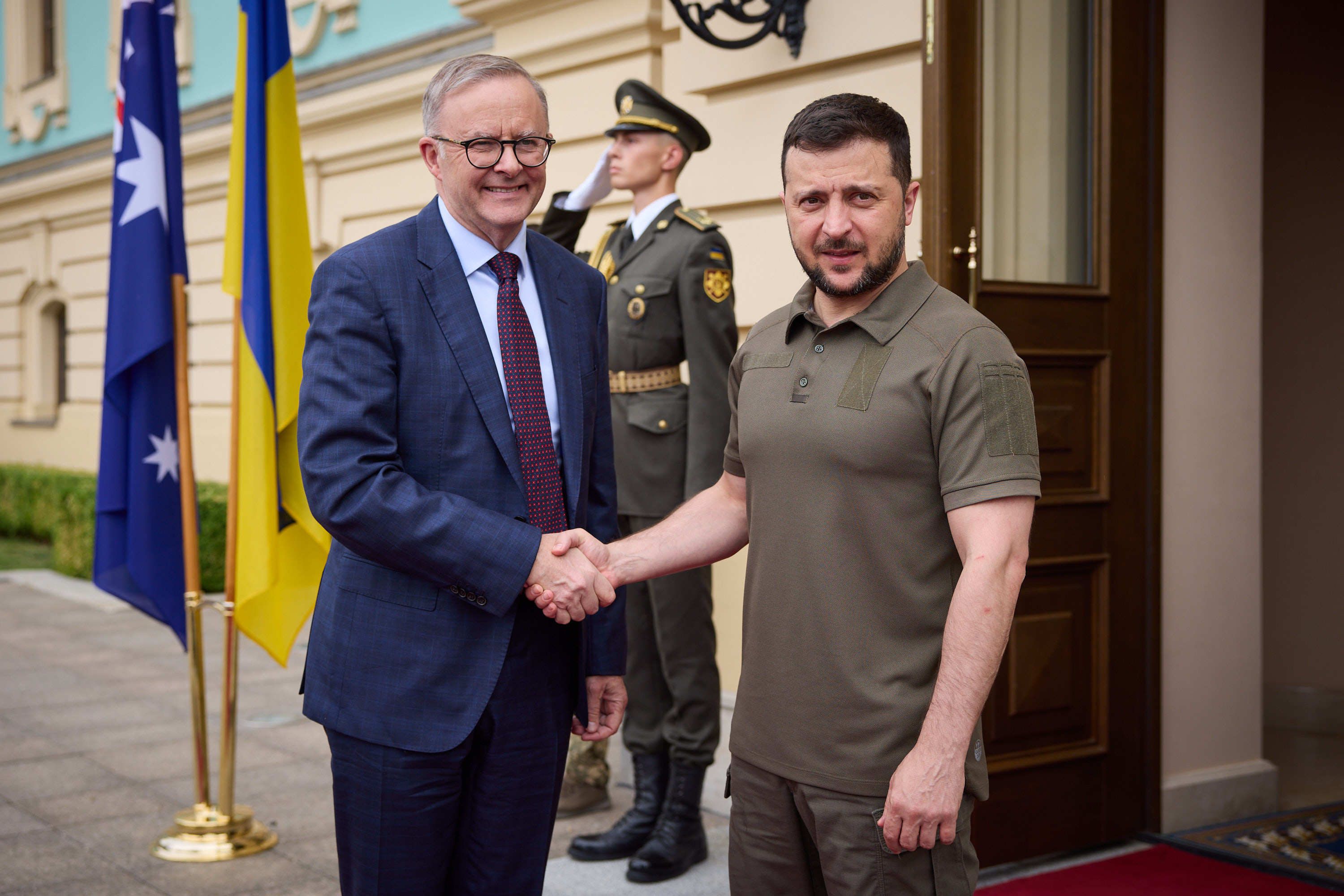
Albanese meeting with Ukrainian president Volodymyr Zelenskyy in Kyiv

On 11 June 2022, Albanese announced that the French defence contractor Naval Group had agreed to settle the previous Morrison government's 2021 cancellation of the 12 attack-class submarines for a €555 million (AU$830 million) compensation settlement. In response, French Armed Forces Minister Sébastien Lecornu welcomed the settlement and stated that France aims to rebuild its relationship with Australia. Later that month, Albanese met with French president Emmanuel Macron in France. On 1 July 2022, Albanese travelled to Ukraine to meet with Ukrainian president Volodymyr Zelenskyy, making him the first Australian prime minister to make a diplomatic visit to Ukraine. Albanese pledged a further $100 million in aid to assist with the ongoing Russo-Ukrainian War. In addition, Albanese and the Australian delegation visited Kyiv and Bucha on 4 July 2022, which had seen fighting with Russian forces.

In early December 2022, Albanese hosted Finnish prime minister Sanna Marin in Sydney; which marked the first state visit by a Finnish head of government to Australia. During the visit, the two leaders discussed several issues including the Australia-European Union trade agreement, human rights, the Russian invasion of Ukraine, and climate change mitigation. In early May 2023, Albanese and Governor-General David Hurley attended the coronation of Charles III in London. A cannon salute was also held in Australia to mark the occasion.

In early July 2023, Albanese visited Germany ahead of the NATO summit in Lithuania. Prior to a scheduled meeting with German chancellor Olaf Scholz, Albanese confirmed a bilateral deal to sell Australian-made armoured vehicles to Germany. In July 2024, Deputy Prime Minister Marles announced a further $250 million in military assistance, the largest single military package from Australia to Ukraine since the Russian invasion of Ukraine. In late December 2024, the federal government confirmed it was working to locate 32-year-old Australian man Oscar Jenkins after he appeared in a video on pro-Kremlin social media accounts purportedly showing him being detained and questioned by Russian soldiers in Ukraine. Jenkins had been serving in the Ukrainian armed forces. In mid-January 2025, Albanese promised to take "the strongest action possible" against Russia if it could be verified that the Russian military had executed Jenkins.

==== India ====
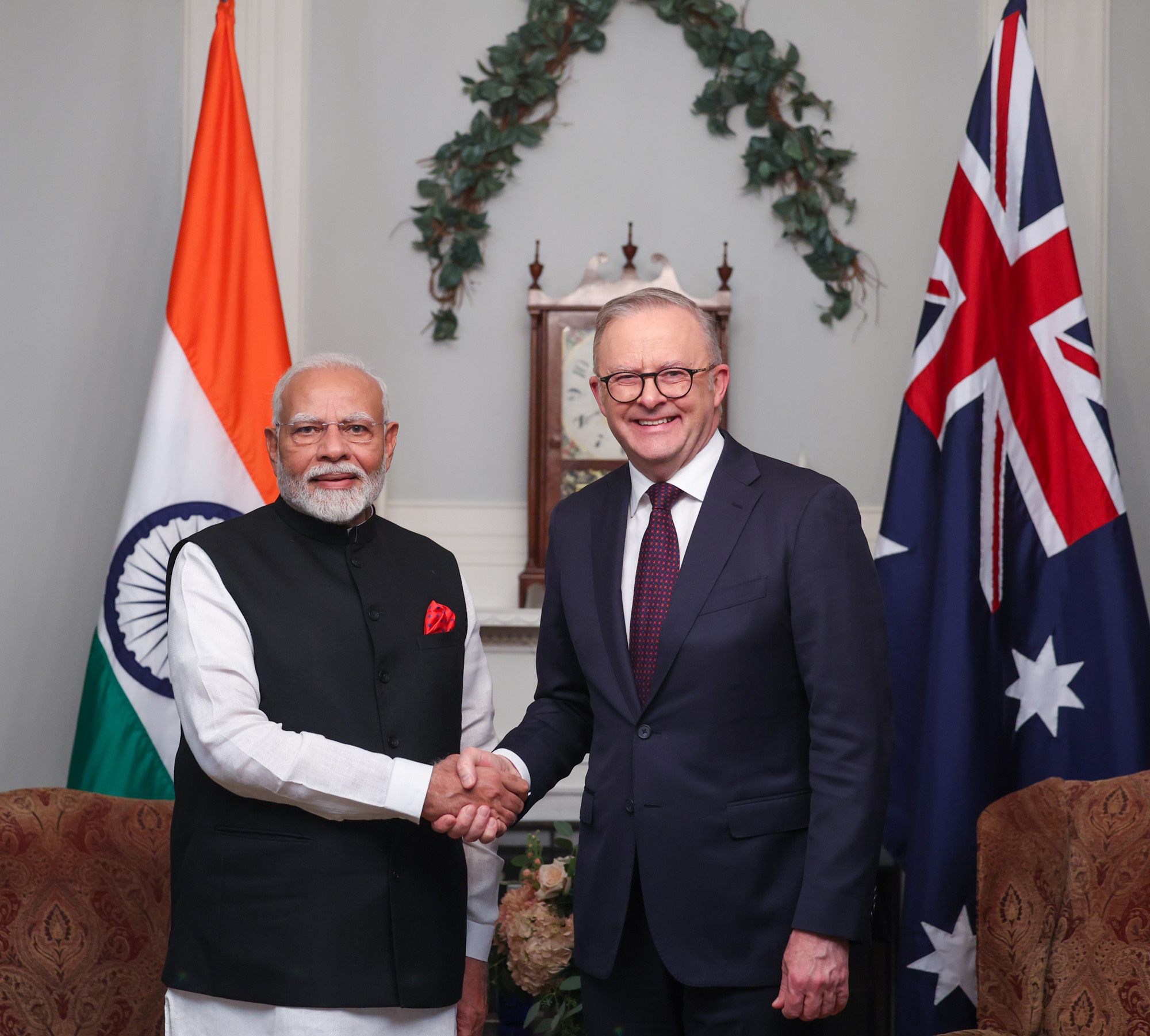
Albanese and Indian Prime Minister Narendra Modi, September 2024

Albanese visited India between 8 and 11 March, where he met Indian prime minister Narendra Modi for the Australia-India Annual Leaders' Summit in New Delhi. The state visit focused on bilateral trade and investment, renewable energy, technology, defence and security cooperation, and educational and cultural ties. Australia and India had previously signed the Australia-India Economic Cooperation and Trade Agreement, which came into force on 29 December 2022. During the visit, Albanese and Modi attended the fourth Australia-India cricket test at Narendra Modi Stadium in Ahmedabad, where the two leaders also rode a chariot in a lap of honour. Modi reciprocated with a two-day state visit to Sydney on 22 May 2023 where he met Australian political and business leaders including Albanese.

==== Israel-Palestine ====
In October 2022, the Albanese government reversed the previous Morrison government's decision to recognise West Jerusalem as Israel's capital. Foreign Minister Penny Wong reaffirmed that Jerusalem's status should be decided through peace negotiations between Israelis and Palestinians. In August 2023, Wong confirmed that Australia would revert to its pre-2014 policy of designating the West Bank, East Jerusalem and the Gaza Strip as "Occupied Palestinian Territories" and the Israeli settlements there as "illegal". Following the outbreak of the Gaza war on 7 October 2023, the Albanese government defended Israel's right to defend itself and retaliate against Hamas' attack. Wong also called for the release of hostages taken by Hamas. Despite its support for Israel, the Albanese government declined to supply weapons to Israel since the start of the conflict.

In mid-February 2024, Wong expressed concerns about Israel's planned Rafah offensive, describing it as "unjustifiable". Albanese, along with Canadian prime minister Justin Trudeau and New Zealand prime minister Christopher Luxon, subsequently issued a joint statement expressing concerns over the planned Israeli ground offensive. In early April 2024, Wong said that the federal government was considering recognising Palestinian statehood as a means of facilitating a two-state solution for Israel and Palestine. Her comments attracted criticism from the Executive Council of Australian Jewry President Daniel Aghon and was welcomed by the president of the Australia Palestine Advocacy Network, Nasser Mashni. In May 2024, the Albanese government voted in favour of a United Nations General Assembly resolution that determined that Palestine met the requirements for United Nations membership. Wong subsequently confirmed that the vote did not mean that Australia would recognise Palestinian statehood but was rather about extending "modest additional rights to participate in United Nations forums". She reiterated that Australia would only recognise Palestine "when we think the time is right" and that a reformed Palestinian Authority, not Hamas, should "lead its people" in a future Palestinian state.

On 1 October 2024, Albanese and Opposition leader Peter Dutton condemned memorial services held at several Shiite Muslim mosques in Sydney to commemorate the death of leader of the terrorist group Hezbollah, Hassan Nasrallah. In addition, federal police commissioner Reece Kershaw warned that law enforcement authorities would take action against those displaying Hezbollah or Hamas flags at national pro-Palestinian rallies being held on 6 October to mark the first anniversary of the 2023 Hamas-led attack on Israel. On 21 November 2024, the International Criminal Court (ICC) issued arrest warrants for Israel's prime minister Benjamin Netanyahu and Defense Minister Yoav Gallant, and Hamas military commander Mohammed Deif (who was subsequently confirmed to have been killed). Foreign Minister Penny Wong stated in an X post that the Australian government "respects the independence of the ICC and its important role in upholding international law".

==== New Zealand ====
On 10 June 2022, Albanese hosted New Zealand prime minister Jacinda Ardern on her first official visit to Australia since 2020. The two leaders discussed a range of issues including Australia's controversial Section 501 deportation policy (which had disproportionately affected New Zealanders living in Australia), growing Chinese influence in the Pacific Islands, climate change, and working with Pacific neighbours. On 7 February 2023, Albanese hosted his New Zealand counterpart Chris Hipkins, who had succeeded Ardern in late January 2023. Besides reaffirming Australian-New Zealand bilateral relations, they also discussed the controversial Section 501 deportation policy. Albanese reiterated that his government would revise the deportation policy to take into account individuals' connections to Australia and the length of time they had lived in the country. Immigration Minister Andrew Giles also issued Ministerial Directive 99 requiring Australian immigration officials to consider a non-citizen's community ties and length of time spent in Australia when cancelling a visa. This policy change was welcomed by Hipkins and the New Zealand Government.

On 22 April 2023, Albanese, Home Affairs Minister Clare O'Neil, and Giles announced the creation of a new direct pathway to Australian citizenship for New Zealand Special Category Visa (SCV) holders, commencing 1 July 2023. Under the policy, SCV holders who have resided in Australia for at least four years and met other residency requirements will be eligible to apply for Australian citizenship without having to apply for permanent residency. In addition, children born in Australia to a New Zealand citizen from 1 July will automatically be eligible for Australian citizenship. The announcement was welcomed by NZ Prime Minister Hipkins and Oz Kiwi chairperson Joanne Cox for improving New Zealanders' access to Australian citizenship, health and social security services. On 26 July 2023, Albanese met with Hipkins as part of the annual Australia-New Zealand leaders' meeting.

In early February 2024, Foreign Minister Wong and Defence Minister Marles hosted their New Zealand counterparts Winston Peters and Judith Collins for a joint bilateral meeting of foreign and defence ministers in Melbourne. Marles confirmed that Australia would send officials to brief their New Zealand counterparts about AUKUS Pillar Two, which would focus on advanced military technology including quantum computing and artificial intelligence. New Zealand is not expected to join AUKUS Pillar One due to its nuclear-free policy. The two governments also committed to reinforced security cooperation in the Indo-Pacific and increased military integration between the Australian and New Zealand militaries. In May 2024, following criticism from opposition politicians that Ministerial Directive 99 had allowed several non-citizens convicted of serious crimes to remain in Australia, Albanese and Giles confirmed that the immigration directive would be revised. On 7 June 2024, Giles issued "Directive 110", which clarified that non-citizens convicted of serious crimes could be deported despite living their whole lives in Australia. In response, New Zealand prime minister Christopher Luxon expressed concern that people with little or no connection with New Zealand were being deported back to the country.

==== The Pacific ====
On 12 January 2023, Albanese became the first foreign leader to address the National Parliament of Papua New Guinea. That same day, he and Papua New Guinea Prime Minister James Marape signed a joint statement pledging that the two countries would reach a new security deal by late April 2023. In mid-June 2024, several Australian cabinet ministers including Marles, Wong and Pat Conroy attended the 30th Australia-Papua New Guinea Ministerial Forum in Port Moresby. During the visit, the Albanese government announced several initiatives under a bilateral security agreement with PNG. This was followed on 12 December 2024 with the announcement that Australia would fund the addition of a PNG team to the National Rugby League from 2028. As part of the funding deal, PNG agreed that Australia would remains its "security partner of choice" and PNG would not sign a military or police security deal with China.

In late September 2023, Defence Minister Richard Marles announced that 500 Australian troops would be relocated to Townsville over the course of six years from 2025 to strengthen the Australian Army's ability to conduct operations missions in the Pacific. This announcement was criticised by the city's mayor Jenny Hill who claimed that Townsville City Council was not consulted about military personnel's housing. In early November 2023, Albanese attended the Pacific Islands Forum annual meeting in the Cook Islands where he met several leaders including Tuvalan Prime Minister Kausea Natano. Key issues discussed at the meeting included the impact of Australian carbon emissions, climate change, nuclear safety, and ongoing US-China tensions. On 10 November 2023, Albanese and Natano signed a bilateral pact between Australia and Tuvalu, known as the Falepili Union. Under the terms of the treaty, Tuvalan citizens will be given a "special mobility pathway" that would allow them to live and work in Australia. In addition, Australia will respond to major natural disasters, pandemics or military aggression against Tuvalu. In return, Australia will have a veto power over Tuvalu's security and defence agreements with other countries.

On 28 August 2024, the Albanese government's Pacific Policing Initiative (PPI) won the support of member states of the Pacific Islands Forum, which Australia is a member. Under the PPI, the Australian federal government will establish a police development and coordination hub in Brisbane for training Pacific police officers. In addition, a "Pacific Police Support Group" will also be established to help with natural disasters, emergencies and other events. Four police training centres of excellence will also be set up across the Pacific, with Australia contributing about A$400m in infrastructure funding over five years. Albanese described the launch of the Pacific Police Initiative as a "great outcome" for Pacific security. Melanesian Spearhead Group director-general Leonard Louma and Vanuatuan Prime Minister Charlot Salwai expressed concern that the PPI could be used by Australian and New Zealand to serve Western interests and lock China out of the region. By contrast, Tongan Prime Minister Siaosi Sovaleni, Fijian prime minister Sitiveni Rabuka, Tuvalan Prime Minister Feleti Teo, and New Zealand prime minister Christopher Luxon expressed support for the PPI. Solomon Islands Prime Minister Jeremiah Manele expressed cautious support for the Pacific Police Initiative but said that national consultation was important.

On 9 December 2024, Albanese signed a joint security treaty with Nauruan President David Adeang in which Australia agreed to provide Nauru with A$100 million (US$64 million) in direct aid over five years in exchange for Nauru consulting Australia before signing any bilateral agreements with other countries.

On 20 December 2024, Albanese signed an A$190 million (US$118 million) agreement with Solomon Islands Prime Minister Manele to expand the capabilities of the Royal Solomon Islands Police Force. This funding package would support the Solomon Islands Police Force's funding, training and infrastructure including the construction of a new police training centre in Honiara. According to Agence France-Presse and Reuters, this funding packaged was intended to compete with expanding Chinese influence in the Pacific region particularly the Solomon Islands, which had entered into a security agreement with China in 2022.

==== Southeast Asia ====
On 6 June 2022, Albanese along with Foreign Minister Wong, Trade Minister Don Farrell and Industry Minister Ed Husic visited Indonesian president Joko Widodo in Jakarta to reaffirm relations with Indonesia and ASEAN (Association of Southeast Asian Nations). On 3 July 2023, Albanese hosted Indonesian president Widodo during a 36-hour visit to Sydney, where he also met several Australian business and political leaders. On 6 September 2023, Albanese attended the ASEAN Summit in Jakarta to promote trade relations with the region. On 8 September, Albanese met with Philippine president Bongbong Marcos in Manila, marking the first state visit to the Philippines by an Australian prime minister in two decades. The two governments agreed to conduct joint naval patrols in the South China Sea.

During 4–6 March 2024, Australia hosted a "special summit" between Australia and the member nations of ASEAN to mark 50 years of diplomatic dialogue relations. Several diplomatic and economic initiatives were reached at the summit, including a $2 billion "Southeast Asia Investment Financing Facility", a $140 million infrastructure development partnership, and expanded business visa programs. On 15 December 2024 Albanese, Wong and Burke confirmed that surviving Bali Nine members Matthew Norman, Scott Rush, Martin Stephens, Si Yi Chen, and Michael Czugaj had been repatriated to Australia after serving over 19 years in prison in Indonesia. The five had been convicted of attempting to import over eight kilograms of heroin from Bali in 2005.

==== United States ====
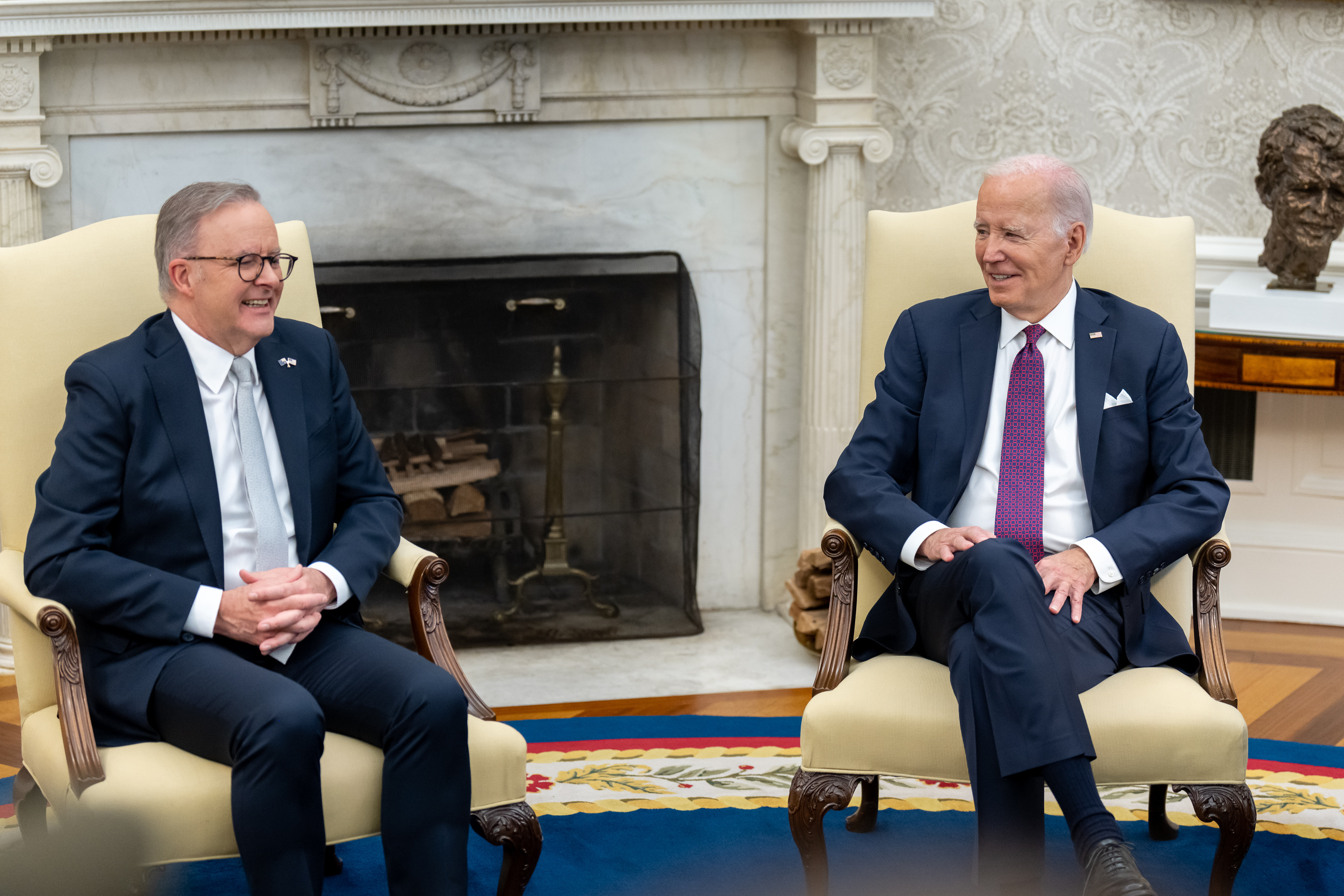
Albanese and US President Joe Biden, October 2023

In late October 2023, Albanese undertook a four-day state visit to Washington, D.C., where he met United States president Joe Biden, Australian Ambassador to the United States Kevin Rudd and several members of the United States Congress. Key objectives of the visit including lobbying Congress to pass AUKUS-related legislation, sign new deals on critical minerals and discuss issues with China and the Israel-Hamas War. On 14 December 2023, Congress passed legislation allowing nuclear-powered submarines to be sold to Australia under the AUKUS agreement.

On 21 September 2024, Albanese met with Biden ahead of the annual Quadrilateral Security Dialogue meeting in Wilmington, Delaware. Following the 2024 United States presidential election held on 6 November, Albanese and Opposition leader Dutton congratulated Republican Party candidate and President-elect Donald Trump.

==== Other foreign affairs and defence ====
On 29 September 2023, Marles announced that the Australian Defence Force would be retiring its fleet of MRH-90 Taipan helicopters following a fatal crash during Exercise Talisman Sabre in July 2023 which killed four military personnel. In early January 2024, Albanese ordered an inquiry into whether the previous Morrison government had failed to hand over documents relating to Australia's involvement in the 2003 invasion of Iraq to the National Archives in 2020 for public release. On 12 September 2024, Marles stripped nine commanding officers who served in the War in Afghanistan of their distinguished service medals, implementing the final recommendation of the Brereton Report which had found "credible evidence" that Australian soldiers had unlawfully killed 39 people.

In late March 2025, Reuters reported that Albanese had pledged A$74 billion for missile procurement in 2024, which included A$21 billion to establish a Guided Weapons and Explosive Ordnance Enterprise in Australia. Australia has formed partnerships with companies like Lockheed Martin, Kongsberg, and Raytheon to acquire long-range strike and hypersonic missiles, with a focus on enhancing defense capabilities in the Indo-Pacific. Despite global supply shortages, local production of missiles, including Kongsberg's Joint Strike and Naval Strike Missiles, is set to begin in 2027, with 10 Australian suppliers already contracted. Australia is also working to produce Guided Multiple Launch Rocket Systems (GMLRS) and High Mobility Artillery Rocket Systems (HIMARS) locally, aimed at improving regional defense readiness.

== Second term of government (2025–present) ==
In a landslide victory and historic comeback, having overturned most of the opinion polling showing either a smaller majority for the Labor government or a hung parliament, the Labor Party won a second majority government in the 2025 election. In doing so, Albanese became the first prime minister since 2004 to win a second consecutive term, as well as the first Labor leader to win re-election since Bob Hawke in 1990.

=== Economy ===
==== Tax reform ====
On 12 May 2026, the Albanese government announced, as part of the 2026 budget, changes to negative gearing and the capital gains tax discount, despite a promise at the 2025 election to leave both policies unchanged. It restricted new negative gearing arrangements to newly-built homes, and removed the capital gains tax discount for any assets bought after 1 July 2027. Furthermore, it implemented a minimum tax rate of 30% on family trusts. The policy measures were criticised by Shadow Treasurer Tim Wilson and One Nation leader Pauline Hanson, with reserved support from Greens leader Larissa Waters. The legislation passed Parliament with the support of the Greens, who negotiated the addition of a ban on self-managed superannuation funds from borrowing to invest in residential property.

==== Allegations of pork-barrelling ====
In September 2026, a Centre for Public Integrity (CPI) investigation made significant allegations of pork-barreling against the Albanese government, through its Major and Local Community Infrastructure (MLCI) Program. The CPI found that, of the over 220 organisations invited to apply, 73% were located in Labor-held seats. CPI executive director Catherine West stated that "for every dollar spent in a Coalition seat, $3.20 was spent in a notionally ALP-held seat". In particular, the Marrickville Golf Club, located in Albanese's seat of Grayndler, received a A$6 million grant as part of the MLCI program. Albanese also held an honorary membership to the club, which was not declared on his register of interests.

=== 2025 Bondi Beach shooting ===
Following the 2025 Bondi Beach shooting on 14 December which targeted a Hanukah gathering, Albanese vowed to "eradicate" antisemitism in Australia and announced plans to introduce new tougher gun laws limiting the number of weapons. On 15 December, the National Cabinet unanimously agreed to strengthen gun laws. Proposals brought forward during the meeting included restricting firearm ownership to Australian citizens only, accelerating the launch of a national firearms register, limiting the number of firearms a single person can own, the duration of firearms licenses and further restricting the types of legal weapons. On 19 December, the Albanese government also confirmed plans to launch a gun buyback program.

On 18 December, the Albanese government confirmed that they would adopt all the recommendations of the government's special envoy to combat antisemitism Jillian Segal's "Plan to Combat Antisemitism". To implement the plan, the National Security Committee agreed to introduce legislation creating an aggravated hate speech offence targeting preachers and leaders promoting violence, increasing penalties for hate speech-related violence, designating hate speech as an aggravating factor in sentencing for online threats and harassment, developing a blacklist of "hate groups", creating a new federal offence related to racial vilification and advocating racial supremacy and giving the Home Affairs Minister new powers to cancel visas or deny entry to individuals spreading hate.

On 21 December, Albanese announced an Independent Commonwealth Review into Australia's federal law enforcement and intelligence agencies to be led by retired public servant Dennis Richardson. The review was expected to deliver a public report on the attack by late April 2026. On 29 December, the review's terms of reference were released. The Albanese government initially ruled out holding a federal royal commission into the Bondi Beach shootings, with Home Affairs Minister Tony Burke saying that it was not the best format for national security issues. However, by 8 January 2026, mounting political and public pressure resulted in the establishment of the Royal Commission on Antisemitism and Social Cohesion, that incorporated the Richardson review, to report by 14 December 2026.

==== Hate speech laws ====
On 12 January 2026, Albanese announced that the Australian Parliament would reconvene on 19 January to introduce fast-tracked hate speech and firearms legislation. He confirmed that the Labor federal government would seek cross-party support from the Coalition and Australian Greens.

The bill passed both houses of parliament on 20 January 2026, It passed in the House 116 votes to 7, and 38–22 in the Senate.

As of May 2026, there is a constitutional challenge from the National Socialist Network related to the constitutionality of the 2026 hate speech and hate group legislation.

==== Gun buyback scheme ====
On 16 August 2026, New South Wales became the first state to join the federal government's gun buyback scheme. On 22 August, the Australian Capital Territory joined the federal government's gun buyback scheme.

=== Disaster relief ===
Following the 2025 New South Wales floods in May 2025, Emergency Minister Kristy McBain announced on 22 May that the Australian Defence Force personnel would be deployed for search and rescue operations in Taree. By 24 May, the National Emergency Management Agency was working to restore food supply, telecommunications and power to flood-affected communities.

=== Education ===
On 31 July 2025, the Albanese government passed legislation in the Australian Parliament reducing student loan debt by 20 percent. The Universities Accord Bill covers several university and TAFE student loans including the Higher Education Loan Programme, VET Student Loan and the Australian Apprenticeship Support Loan.

In mid November 2025, The Guardian Australia reported that the Australian Skills Quality Authority (ASQA) had cancelled the registrations of 11 vocational training organisations and voided about 30,000 diplomas, certificates and statements of attainment since late 2024. The ASQA also deregistered four educational providers and investigated 144 other providers for "serious matters". In 2023, the Albanese government had allocated A$37.8 million to improving the quality of vocational training and educational programmes, including establishing a new enforcement unit at the ASQA and a new tip line. This crackdown was part of the federal government's ongoing efforts to combat unscrupulous vocational diploma mills providing dubious courses, accreditation, and so-called "fast-track skilled migration pathways".

=== Energy ===
On 30 March 2026, Albanese confirmed that the Australian government would reduce the fuel excise rate from 52.6 cents to 26.3 cents per litre between 1 April and 30 June to address rising fuel prices caused by the 2026 Iran war, and encourage people to use public transportation. State and federal leaders also agreed to reduce the heavy vehicle road user charge during that period to help truck drivers.

=== Gambling ===
In April 2026, Albanese announced that the government would introduce a cap of three gambling advertisements per hour and prohibit gambling advertising on sports jerseys. Ads will be capped from 6:30 am to 8:30 pm and will be banned during school pick up and drop off times. Gambling ads will also be banned on social media unless users are over 18 and are able to opt out of these notifications. Gambling ads featuring celebrities or athletes will also be banned. Ads containing odds details will also be banned. Gambling ads at sports venues will also be banned.

=== Indigenous affairs ===
On 4 March 2026, the Albanese government launched a federal parliamentary inquiry into racism, hate and violence against Indigenous Australians in response to the 2026 Invasion Day protest bombing attempt, which occurred in Perth on Australia Day.

=== Internet and social media ===
In late July 2025, Google warned that it would sue the Australian government if YouTube was included under the government's social media ban for children below 16 years. On 30 July, the Albanese government that it would extend its social media age limit to include YouTube following advice from eSafety commissioner Julie Inman Grant.

On 26 November 2025, the Digital Freedom Project announced it would commence legal action in the High Court against the new laws, saying they violate the implied right to political communication in the Constitution.

On 10 December 2025, the Online Safety Amendment (Social Media Minimum Age) Act 2024 came into effect, requiring social media to implement age verification systems with the goal of restricting access to minors under the age of 16.

On 31 March 2026, Communications Minister Anika Wells announced that the government would investigate social media platforms Facebook, Instagram, Snapchat, TikTok and YouTube for potential violations of the under-16 social media ban.

On 15 July 2026, Albanese announced that a specialist "Office of AI" would be created with the Department of the Prime Minister and Cabinet to oversee the development of artificial intelligence standards and regulate the environmental and energy impacts of data centres.

=== Foreign affairs, trade and defence ===
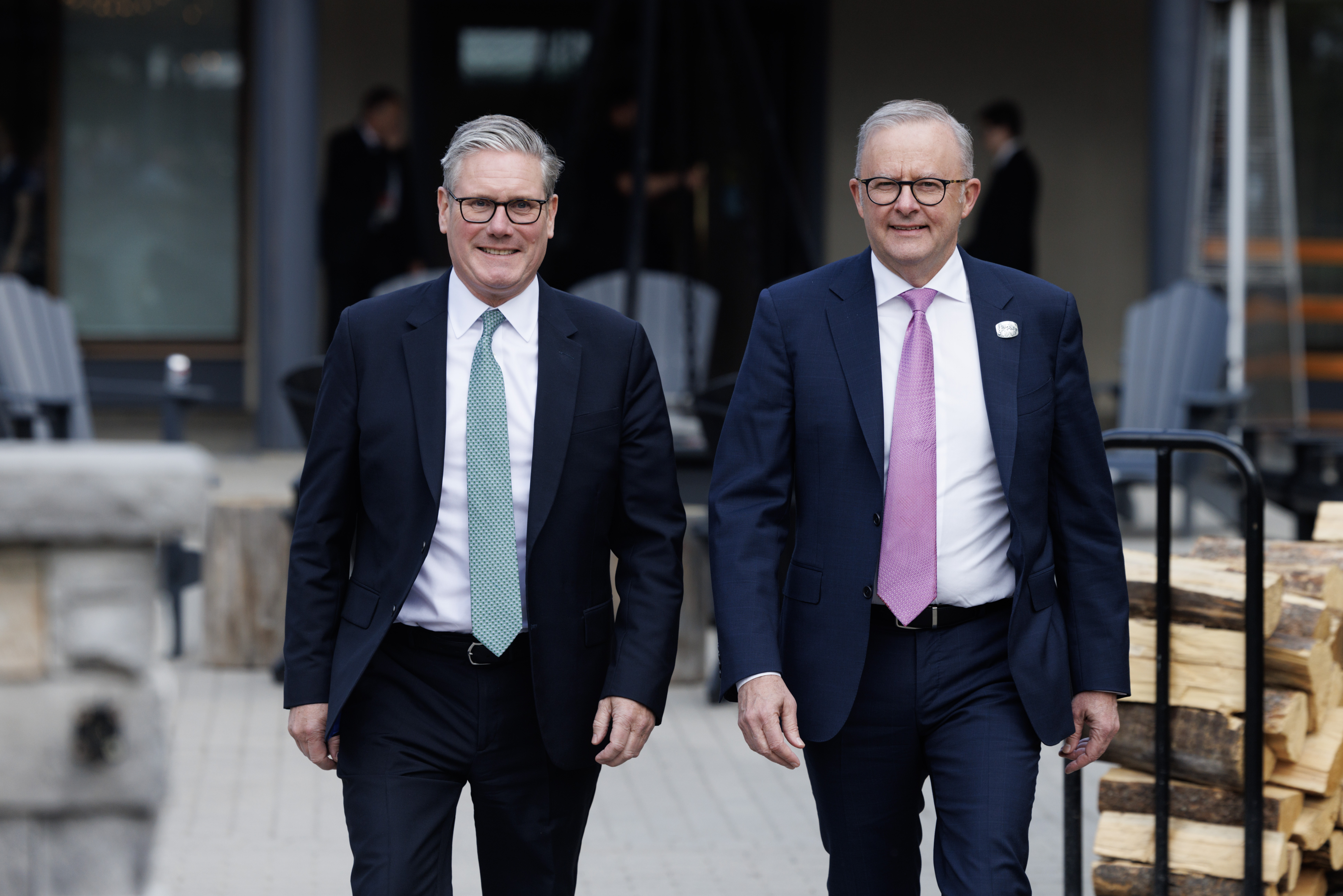
Albanese and British Prime Minister Keir Starmer, June 2025

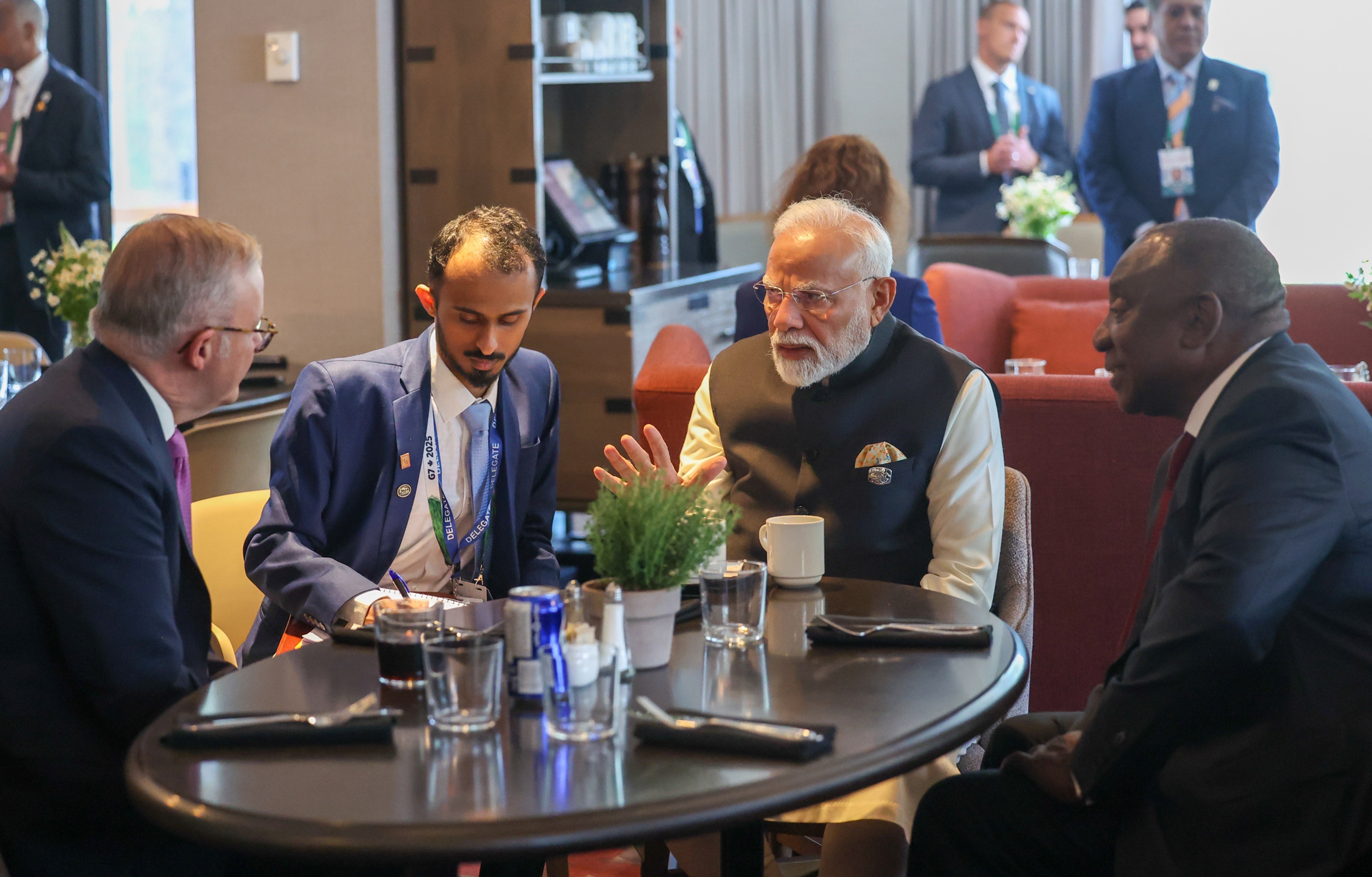
Albanese with Indian Prime Minister Narendra Modi and South African President Cyril Ramaphosa, June 2025

==== Africa ====
In November 2026, the Australian government sanctioned Sudanese Armed Forces chief Abdel Fattah al-Burhan, Rapid Support Forces leader Hemedti and several other RSF officials (Hussein Barsham and Al-Tijani Karshoum) and the Al-Bara' ibn Malik Battalion for human rights violations in the ongoing Sudanese civil war.

==== China and East Asia ====
In July 2025, Albanese went on a six-day visit to China. The visit include a trip to the Great Wall and a panda breeding center, which drew criticism from the Coalition. Albanese responded by saying that the visits were intended to show respect to China. According to critics, Albanese ignored the issue of human rights in China, including human rights violations in Hong Kong, Xinjiang, and Tibet, and focused only on trade.

On 4 May 2026, Albanese and Japanese Prime Minister Takaichi Sanae signed four agreements in Canberra to boost bilateral cooperation in the areas of energy, defence and critical minerals and a joint declaration on economic security cooperation. The critical minerals agreement identifies six rare earth strategic projects to diversify supply chains including the Lynas rare earth project in Kalgoorlie and Alcoa's Gallium Recovery Project.

==== Europe ====
On 23 March 2026, Albanese and the President of the European Commission Ursula von der Leyen signed a free trade agreement following eight years of negotiations. The two leaders also announced a new defence partnership between Australia and the European Union.

==== Israel–Palestine ====
In May 2025, Albanese echoed criticisms from other Western nations in demanding Israel allow the supply of humanitarian aid into the Gaza Strip, condemning Israel's actions as "completely unacceptable" and an "outrage". However, he opposed sanctions against Israel over the blockade of Gaza, saying he was focusing on "peace and security for both Israelis and Palestinians" rather than "soundbites".

On 11 June 2025, Foreign Minister Wong announced that Australia would join New Zealand, Canada, the United Kingdom and Norway in banning and freezing the assets of two far-right Israeli government ministers Itamar Ben-Gvir and Bezalel Smotrich, stating:

Extremist rhetoric advocating the forced displacement of Palestinians and the creation of new Israeli settlements is appalling and dangerous. These actions are not acceptable. We have engaged the Israeli Government on this issue extensively, yet violent perpetrators continue to act with encouragement and immunity. Today's measures are targeted towards individuals who in our view undermine Israel's own security and its standing in the world.

The joint travel bans and sanctions were condemned by Israeli foreign minister Gideon Sa'ar, United States Secretary of State Marco Rubio, Ben-Gvir and Smotrich as hostile actions against Israel. Albanese defended his government's response, stating that Australia was concerned about humanitarian issues in Gaza. The Coalition's foreign affairs spokesperson Michaelia Cash expressed concern about the travel ban being part of a "pattern of decisions by the Albanese government targeting the Israeli government".

In late July 2025, the Albanese government joined 15 other countries including France, Canada and New Zealand in signing the "New York Call" which proposed recognising Palestinian statehood at the United Nations General Assembly in September 2025. This announcement was criticised by both the US and Israeli governments for "rewarding" Hamas' terrorism. On 9 August, Foreign Minister Wong joined her German, Italian, New Zealand and British counterparts in issuing a joint statement condemning Israeli prime minister Benjamin Netanyahu's plan to militarily occupy Gaza City. That same day, Albanese and New Zealand prime minister Christopher Luxon called for a ceasefire in Gaza and opposed Israeli plans to occupy Gaza City.

On 11 August 2025, Albanese announced plans to recognise the State of Palestine at the United Nations in September.

In August 2025, the Greens urged the Albanese government to impose direct sanctions on high-ranking members of Netanyahu's government and to stop supplying parts for F-35 fighter jets to the global supply chain that can be accessed by Israel. Greens senator David Shoebridge said: "If the Albanese government stopped the export of F-35 fighter jet parts to Israel, then their F-35 fleet would be grounded." According to Amnesty International, by participating in the production of the F-35, Australia violated the Arms Trade Treaty.

On 18 November 2026, the Albanese government sanctioned several Israeli activists and entities for "illegal settlement growth" in the West Bank.

==== Iran ====
In June 2025, Albanese and Foreign Minister Wong voiced support for US strikes on Iranian nuclear sites.

On 26 August 2025, Albanese declared the Iranian Ambassador Ahmad Sadeghi and three other Iranian officials persona non grata after an investigation by the Australian Security Intelligence Organisation found that the Islamic Revolutionary Guard Corps was responsible for attacking a Jewish restaurant in Sydney and a Melbourne synagogue in late 2024. Albanese also confirmed that Australia had withdrawn its diplomats from Tehran and would designate the IRGC as a terrorist organisation. Wong said that this was the first time since World War II that Australia had expelled an ambassador.

On 21 October 2025, the office of the Attorney-General issued a provisional transparency notice designating the Iranian state media outlet Press TV as a foreign government entity. The designation was finalised on 18 November 2025, and was formally listed on the Foreign Influence Transparency Scheme register.

On 27 November 2025, the Australian Parliament formally designated the Islamic Revolutionary Guard Corps as a state sponsor of terrorism, under the framework of the Criminal Code Amendment (State Sponsors of Terrorism) Act 2025.

During the 2025-2026 Iranian protests, the Australian embassy in Iran ceased its operations. Australian citizens were urged by the government to leave Iran as soon as possible due to the violent crackdowns and arrests by Iranian security forces. Following the outbreak of the 2026 Iran war on 28 February 2026, Albanese along with Wong and Marles expressed support for US and Israeli strikes, also stating Australia stood with "the brave people of Iran in their struggle against oppression".

On 10 March 2026, the federal government granted humanitarian visas to five members of the Iran women's national football team competing in the 2026 AFC Women's Asian Cup amid fears for their safety during the 2026 Iran war and their refusal to sing the Iranian national anthem during a match against South Korea. Two more Iranian footballers subsequently sought asylum in Australia, bringing the total number to seven. That same day, Albanese confirmed that Australia would deploy a long-range reconnaissance aircraft and air-to-air missiles to the United Arab Emirates to help the Gulf States defend themselves against Iranian missiles.

==== Repatriation of ISIS-linked individuals ====
In early December 2025, The Guardian Australia reported that the Albanese government had declined an American offer to help repatriate about 40 Australian citizens from camps near the Syrian-Turkish border including Roj camp. These individuals are the wives, widows and children of dead and imprisoned Islamic State fighters. In June 2025, Home Affairs Minister Tony Burke had met with Save the Children CEO Mat Tinkler and repatriate advocate Kamalle Dabboussy, who expressed concerns that these individuals were being radicalised. In August 2025, Tinkler and Dabboussy confirmed that the US government had offered to facilitate the repatriation of the 40 Australians. While the Australian government has previously repatriated several nationals from Syria in 2019 and 2022, the Albanese government had declined the American offer due to concerns of a backlash from certain constituents during the lead-up to the 2025 Australian federal election.

On 17 February 2026, Albanese said that the federal government would not help repatriate ISIS-linked families in Syria, stating "if you make your bed, you lie in it." Home Affairs Minister Burke also confirmed the federal government was seeking advice on whether the threshold for imposing temporary exclusion orders had been met. In mid-February 2026, a group of 34 Australian nationals including 11 women and 23 children, had left the Al-Roj refugee camp with the intention of traveling to Damascus to return to Australia. They had been blocked from leaving Syrian Democratic Forces-controlled territory by Syrian government forces. Opposition Liberal Senator Sarah Henderson advocated blocking the return of ISIS-linked adults, citing public safety concerns.

In late April 2026, a group of four Australian women and nine children left the Al-Roj refugee camp and headed to Damascus with the intention of returning to Australia. According to a Syrian official, their repatriation had been delayed by the Australian government for two weeks while they "put procedures in place" to receive the repatriates. On 6 May, the Albanese government confirmed that the group had booked tickets and were expected to arrive in Australia the following day. The group arrived at Sydney and Melbourne Airports on 7 May. Police charged two of the women in Melbourne with crime against humanity relating to slavery while a third woman who arrived in Sydney was charged with entering a prohibited area and bineg a member of a terrorist organisation.

==== Southeast Asia ====
On 15 May 2025, Albanese visited Indonesian president Prabowo Subianto in Jakarta, making his first overseas trip following the 2025 federal election. The state visit sought to shore up Australia–Indonesia relations in the areas of food security, energy, trade, and critical minerals as well as personal relations between the two national leaders. Albanese received an official state reception from Subianto at Merdeka Palace in Jakarta. During the visit, Albanese encouraged Indonesia to pursue closer defence cooperation with Australia while Subianto encouraged Australian investment in the Indonesian economy. Albanese also stated that Indonesia had ruled out allowing the Russians to establish a military base in Western New Guinea.

In mid November 2025, Albanese hosted President Prabowo during his first state visit to Sydney. On 12 November, the two leaders confirmed that they would sign a new defence treaty in January 2026 that would commit the two governments to consulting on both leadership and ministerial levels on security matters. The treaty builds upon the 2024 Defence Cooperation Agreement, and is also based on a cancelled 1995 bilateral peace agreement signed between Australian prime minister Paul Keating and Indonesian president Suharto. Albanese and Prabowo formally signed the bilateral security treaty on 6 February 2026.

In April 2026, Albanese visited Singapore, Brunei and Malaysia to strengthen economic and energy cooperation with those countries in response to energy shortages caused by the 2026 Iran war. In return for obtain for obtaining access to fuel and fertiliser from Malaysia and Brunei, Australian has agreed supply gas and food. On 10 April, Albanese met with Singaporean Prime Minister Lawrence Wong and signed a bilateral agreement to meet each other's energy needs, with Singapore agreeing to continue supplying refined fuel in return for Australia supplying liquefied natural gas (LNG). On 15 April, Albanese met with Sultan of Brunei Hassanal Bolkiah and the two leaders signed an agreement to maintain open trade and to protect energy supply chains particularly Bruneian diesel and fertiliser exports to Australia. On 16 April, Albanese met with Malaysian Prime Minister Anwar Ibrahim. The Malaysian oil and gas company Petronas agreed to provide Australia with excess fuel supplies in return for Australia prioritising its LNG exports to Malaysia.

On 15 November 2026, the Philippines and Australian governments signed an upgraded defence agreement.

==== New Zealand ====
Between 9 and 10 August 2025, Albanese visited New Zealand prime minister Christopher Luxon in Queenstown for an annual bilateral head of government meeting. During the visit, the two heads of government reiterated calls for a ceasefire in the Gaza war and condemned Israel's plan to occupy Gaza City. The two heads of government also discussed various bilateral trade and defence issues including the Gaza war, relations with China and Australia's 501 deportation policy. The two leaders also laid wreaths at a memorial to fallen ANZAC soldiers in Arrowtown on 10 August.

In early December 2025, Treasurer Jim Chalmers and Minister for Climate Change and Energy Chris Bowen met with their New Zealand counterparts Nicola Willis and Simon Watts to discuss strengthening bilateral cooperation on climate action, clean energy and related regulations.

On 17 March, Foreign Minister Wong and Defence Minister Marles hosted their New Zealand counterparts Winston Peters and Judith Collins during the third annual Australia and New Zealand Foreign and Defence Ministers' Meeting in Canberra to discuss foreign policy and defence issues of interests to both countries. The four ministers issued a joint statement reaffirming bilateral cooperation in the Pacific and global security challenges, and criticising Chinese assertiveness in the South China Sea and Russian aggression against Ukraine. In response, the Chinese Embassy in New Zealand criticised the New Zealand and Australian governments for interfering in Chinese internal affairs, their perceived silence on US military actions during the 2026 Iran war and their alleged "poor records" on human rights and ethnic minorities.

==== The Pacific ====
On 29 August 2025, the Australian and Nauruan governments signed an agreement with Nauru agreeing to accept several formerly detained people without valid Australian visas to the islands in exchange for financial compensation of at least A$408 million.

On 14 September 2025, the Australian and Papuan governments announced plans to sign a landmark defence treaty that would integrate the two countries' defence forces on 15 September, which would coincide with the 50th anniversary of Papua New Guinea's independence. This proposed agreement would allow Australians and Papuans to serve in each other's militaries, allowing Papuans to gain Australian citizenship. On 16 September, Albanese said that Australia would contribute funds to the construction of a new ministerial wing for the National Parliament of Papua New Guinea. By 18 September, the two governments had still not yet signed the defence treaty after Papuan Prime Minister James Marape's cabinet was unable to reach a quorum. Instead, the Australian and Papuan governments signed a communique and committed to signing the treaty within the following weeks.

On 19 September, the Chinese Embassy in Papua New Guinea expressed concern that the Australian-Papuan defence treaty would affect Papua New Guinea's ability to conduct foreign relations with third parties. The Papua New Guinea cabinet subsequently approved the treaty on 2 October. Marape and Albanese signed the treaty in Canberra on 6 October 2025.

On 29 June 2026, Albanese and Vanuatuan Prime Minister Jotham Napat signed a bilateral economic and security agreement known as the Nakamal Agreement barring the establishment of any foreign military base on the island state.

On 6 July, Albanese and Fijian Prime Minister Sitiveni Rabuka signed a formal defence treaty known as the Ocean of Peace Alliance and an economic agreement known as the Vuvale Union that would see Australia invest A$1 billion into the Fijian economy and allow more Fijian citizens to come to Australia. These agreements were part of the Albanese government's efforts to combat Chinese influence in the Pacific region. In response to the Ocean of Peace Alliance, Chinese Foreign Ministry spokeswoman Mao Ning urged Australia to respect the independence of Pacific island nations and "to avoid targeting or harming the interests of any third parties". Hours after the Australian-Fijian defence treaty, the Chinese military tested a long-range ballistic missile in the Pacific Ocean, triggering protests from Australia, New Zealand and Japan. In response, Defence Minister Marles and Foreign Minister Wong expressed concern about any actions which undermined peace and stability in the Pacific region.

==== United States ====
On 25 July 2025, Agriculture Minister Julie Collins confirmed that Australia would relax biosecurity restrictions on US beef imports. This announcement was welcomed by both US president Donald Trump and Secretary of Agriculture Brooke L. Rollins as a "major trade breakthrough" for US beef exporters.

On 21 October 2025, Albanese met with Trump at the White House. The two leaders signed a rare earths agreement aimed at countering Chinese control over the supply of critical minerals. Trump also reiterated the United States' commitment to supplying nuclear-powered submarines to Australia as part of the AUKUS agreement. During the White House visit, Trump rebuked Australian Ambassador Kevin Rudd for making critical social media remarks about him in the past. Following the press conference, Rudd personally apologised to Trump. While Albanese and veteran Republican Michael McCaul expressed confidence in Ambassador Rudd, Opposition Leader Sussan Ley called on Rudd to resign as Ambassador to the United States.

In late December 2025, Foreign Minister Penny Wong voiced support for US airstrikes against Islamic State forces in Nigeria that occurred on Christmas Day.

In January 2026, Albanese called for "dialogue and diplomacy" following a U.S. military operation in Venezuela that resulted in the capture of President Nicolás Maduro.

==== Defence and security cooperation ====
On 13 July 2025, Minister for Defence Industry Pat Conroy stated that Australia would not commit military forces to any conflict involving Taiwan during an interview with the Australian Broadcasting Corporation. The previous day, the Financial Times had reported that Elbridge Colby, the Under Secretary of Defense for Policy, had been pressing Australian and Japanese officials on what they would do in the event of a conflict between China and Taiwan. In response, the Shadow Defence Minister Angus Taylor said that Australia should make "principled commitments to Taiwan's security and be prepared to act under certain circumstances".

On 26 July 2025, the Australian Foreign and Defence Ministers Wong and Marles signed the Geelong Treaty with their British counterparts, Foreign Secretary David Lammy and Secretary of State for Defence John Healey. The Geelong Treaty is a 50-year bilateral defence agreement to facilitate cooperation on the construction of Australia's nuclear-powered SSN-AUKUS submarine fleet under Phase I of the AUKUS pact.

On 28 May 2026, the Australian government filed a A$2 billion lawsuit against the American multinational conglomerate 3M, alleging that the company made false statements about the long-term environmental impact of firefighting foam containing PFAS that was used at 28 Australian Defence Force sites. This lawsuit marks the largest legal claim brought by the Australian government. In response, 3M said that it would fight the lawsuit.

== See also ==
- 2020s in Australia political history
