= Australia–Indonesia Security Agreements =

Government treaties between Australia and Indonesia

1995 Security Agreement
Agreement between the Government of Australia and the Government of the Republic of Indonesia on Maintaining Security
- Signed: 18 December 1995
- Location: Jakarta, Indonesia
- Effective: 15 July 1996
- Signatories: Australia; Indonesia

Lombok Treaty
Agreement between the Australia and the Republic of Indonesia on the Framework for Security Cooperation
- Signed: 13 November 2006
- Location: Lombok, Indonesia
- Effective: 7 February 2008
- Signatories: Australia; Indonesia

Jakarta Treaty
Treaty Between The Government of Australia and the Government of the Republic of Indonesia on Common Security
- Signed: 6 February 2026
- Location: Jakarta, Indonesia
- Signatories: Australia; Indonesia

The Australia–Indonesia Security Agreement or Lombok Treaty, is a formal agreement signed by the Australian and Indonesian Governments concerning issues such as security, defense, and military cooperation involving the two countries. Since 1995, five official agreements have been signed: the 1995 Agreements, the 2006 Lombok Treaty, two Defence Cooperation Agreements relating to the Lombok Treaty, and the 2014 Joint Understanding on Security.

The first agreement, signed in 1995, was the first of its kind for Indonesia, and was at first received well by both countries. However, after the East Timorese crisis in 1999, the agreement was abrogated by Indonesia, and relations "nosedived" between the two countries. No new security agreements were signed until the Lombok Treaty of 2006. This second treaty proved more successful, and, with two updated agreements since its original signing, remains in force as of May 2019.

== Background ==
Paul Keating's 1992 Indonesia visit

Indonesia proclaimed independence after the conclusion of World War II, which Australia did not recognize until 1947. Australia remained cautious of Communist influence in Indonesia, specifically with Sukarno, the first president of Indonesia. Relations greatly improved between the two nations after the succession of Suharto to the presidency in 1967. Suharto proffered a strongly anti-Communist stance during his early reign, a position that found great support with successive Australian Government. Suharto would hold office for thirty years, until 1998.

In 1975, Indonesia invaded East Timor. During the early skirmishes of the invasion, five Australian journalists were shot and killed by Indonesian military forces. The Gough Whitlam-led Australian government apparently denied knowledge of the killings, and instead maintained support for Indonesia's annexation of East Timor. After Whitlam was removed from leadership, new Prime Minister Malcolm Fraser remained committed to the same policy. In 1978, the Fraser government recognised Indonesia's de facto sovereignty in East Timor and later the Hawke government, by signing the 1989 Timor Gap Treaty, recognised that same sovereignty as de jure.

The relationship between Indonesia and Australia was relatively steady after East Timor. Paul Keating became Prime Minister in 1991, and was noted as a fervent supporter of stronger diplomatic ties between the two countries. Government representatives would visit Indonesia four times a year during Keating's leadership, and in 1994, Keating told the Australian cabinet:

"No country is more important to Australia than Indonesia. If we fail to get this relationship, and nurture and develop it, then the whole web of our foreign relations is incomplete."

It was in 1994 that Keating first proposed an official security agreement between the two nations, raising the point with President Suharto in June of that year.

== 1995 Security Agreement ==
The Agreement Between the Government of Australia and the Government of the Republic of Indonesia ('1995 Agreement') was signed by Australian Foreign Minister Gareth Evans and Indonesian Foreign Minister Ali Alatas in Jakarta on 18 December 1995. The Agreement was the first bilateral security agreement signed by Indonesia. The treaty begins with a preamble that addresses the mutual desire of both nations to reinforce the bond between them while working together to maintain peace and stability in the Oceanic and South-East Asian regions. Then, it outlines how this shared interest is aimed at producing an outcome that sees bona fide security in the region that would most benefit the two nations in allowing them the greatest possible environment for "economic development and prosperity" for themselves and the wider region. The treaty reaffirms the sovereignty and integrity of the respective land held by both nations, as well as the commitment made by both nations to the UN Charter that would see them settle any potential disputes in a peaceful manner. Additionally, it is recognised that while each nation is primarily responsible for its own security, contributions may be made by the other party to ensure security within the region. These bilateral security effort, it is noted, is something that will inevitably affect the wider region, and thus that both nations should consent to security cooperation strategies that will enhance autonomous security and the security of the wider region. Finally, it is noted that this treaty affects in no way existing international commitments held by either nation.

Then are listed the four articles that properly form the treaty. The first article outlines a promise made by both nations to consult regularly on matters affecting their shared security so as to best develop the aforementioned strategies that will affect their own security and that of the wider region.

The second article outlines the promise of both nations to consult one another on security matters beyond the scope of a single nation's security capabilities, or that affect both nations in kind. The outcome of these consultations will not necessarily be the deployment of bilateral action, but individual action taken with still be done so in accordance with the processes of each nation.

The third article promises the mutual promotion of mutually beneficial co-operations in the security field between the two nations. Article four ratifies the previous three, and acknowledges that they will enter force on the day of the treaty's signing. The 1995 Agreement was entered into force on 15 July 1996.

=== Dissolution of the 1995 Agreement ===
However, this first treaty proved short-lived. In 1998, Suharto, one of the driving forces of the treaty alongside Keating, resigned after thirty years in power. Following this resignation, an agreement between Indonesia and Portugal – Portugal had held custodianship over East Timor from the colonial period until the brief Timorese independence in 1975 – led to a United Nations-sponsored referendum in 1999, during which the East Timorese people voted overwhelmingly for independence from Indonesia. The referendum led to widespread violence across East Timor between the East Timorese military and various pro-Indonesia militia groups and Indonesian soldiers that resulted in many deaths on both sides. As a result, the UN sponsored a peacekeeping force to be deployed in Indonesia, consisting of a coalition of various national defence force;, made up chiefly of troops from Australia, New Zealand and Thailand; and under the command of Australia General Peter Cosgrove. This force, named INTERFET, entered Indonesia in September 1999 and maintained peace in the region until the UN intervened with its own specialist security force, labelled UNTAET. UNTAET entered Indonesia in October 1999 and on 20 May 2002, the Democratic Republic of Timor-Leste was recognised as fully independent by the UN.

Australia's involvement in East Timor led to a great rift with Indonesia. In 2010, then-Indonesian ambassador Imron Cotan noted:

[at the time the agreement was terminated] "Australia's actions in East Timor were inconsistent with both the letter and spirit of the agreement."

As a result, in September 1999, the same month Australia entered East Timor, Indonesia officially abrogated 1995 agreement. Relations between the two nations stayed muted during the early 2000s, with Indonesia either delaying or flat-out cancelling most official engagements between the two nations. However, two occasions allowed for the restoration of strong political ties between Australia and Indonesia prior to the signing of the Lombok Treaty in 2006 – the Bali Bombings in 2002, and the Sixth Indonesia-Australia Ministerial Forum in 2003. Some anti-Australian sentiment remained in Indonesia, inflamed in early 2006 by Australia's welcoming of Papua New Guinean refugees in the midst of the Papua conflict with Indonesia. However, a new security treaty was proposed this time by Indonesian President Susilo Bambang Yudhoyono shortly before his Australia visit in April 2005, a proposal that would eventually become the Lombok Treaty.

== Lombok Treaty ==
The Agreement Between Australia and the Republic of Indonesia on the Framework for Security Cooperation ('Lombok Treaty') was signed by Australia Foreign Minister Alexander Downer and Indonesia Foreign Minister Hassan Wirajuda on 13 November 2006 in Mataram, Lombok, one of the islands in the Indonesian archipelago. This treaty was much more substantial than the earlier 1995 Agreement, and dealt more explicitly with the exact security issues each nation would face. It begins with a very similar preamble to that of the earlier agreement, outlining both countries' commitments to upholding the UN Charter, mutual recognition of the respective sovereignty, unity and territorial integrity of both nations; and a clause promising adherence to each nation's laws and regulations. Then, the treaty goes into the articles proper, as in the earlier agreement:

The first article simply outlines the purpose of the treaty, as way to both provide a framework for cooperative security regarding common security threats to the two nations; and to establish a mechanism by which the two nations may continuously interact when aforementioned threats arise.

Article 2 presented the most significant change between the 1995 Agreement and the Lombok Treaty, specifically in clause 2.3:

"The Parties, consistent with their respective domestic laws and international obligations, shall not in any manner support or participate in activities by any person or entity which constitutes a threat to the national stability, sovereignty or territorial integrity of the other Party, including by those who seek to use its territory for encouraging or committing such activities, including separatism, in the territory of the other Party."

Jim Elmslie, a scholar at the University of Sydney Centre for Peace and Conflict Studies, noted in 2009 that 'the treaty arose in response to West Papuans who landed in Australia in 2005,' and further, that clause 2.3 'sought to suppress support for West Papuan independence in Australia.' Additionally, he draws parallels between the 2005 West Papuan conflict and the 1999 East Timor crisis – both involved Indonesian territories inciting some separatist action against Indonesia. Academic Hugh White echoes this notion, writing in 2008: 'clause 2.3 seemed to commit the Australian Government to preventing anybody in Australia from 'encouraging' it [separatism] in Indonesia,' and that 'by signing the treaty we [Australia] would raise unrealistic expectations in Jakarta about how Canberra will respond next time there is a crisis in West Papua.' The comments made by Elmslie and White certainly seem to posit that clause 2.3 of the Lombok Treaty was formulated in direct response to the West Papuan crisis and Australia's brief involvement with the West Papuan refugees. Additionally, judging by Elmslie's words and context surrounding the abrogation of the 1995 Agreement, that clause 2.3 was also influenced by Australia's protracted involvement in and direct conflict with Indonesia during the 1999 East Timor Crisis.

The remainder of the treaty contains many of the same assurances offered by the 1995 Agreement: a commitment to defence cooperation, mentioned earlier in Article 1; a commitment to law enforcement cooperation, counter-terrorism cooperation, intelligence cooperation, maritime security, aviation safety and security, the prevention of the proliferation of weapons of mass destruction, cooperation in international organisations on security-related issues and community understanding and people-to-people cooperation.

The Lombok Treaty entered into force of 7 February 2008.

== Further security agreements ==
The Lombok Treaty, unlike its earlier counterpart, has remained in force as of 29 May 2019. Since its initial signing, three more official security and/or defence-based agreements have been signed between Australia and Indonesia. In 2012, the first security defence arrangement was signed by both nations. This agreement expired on 5 September 2017, but was reinstated on 1 February 2018 by Australian Defence Minister Marisa Payne and Indonesian Minister for Defence Ryamizard Ryacudu. The two Australia-Indonesia Defence Cooperation Arrangements (DCA) exist to reinforce the Lombok Treaty, and both act as reaffirmations of the commitments laid out in 2006.

In 2014, Australian Foreign Minister Julie Bishop and Indonesia Foreign Minister Marty Natalegawa signed the Joint Understanding on a code of conduct between the Republic of Indonesia and Australia in implementation of the agreement between the Republic of Indonesia and Australia on the Framework for Security Cooperation. This agreement, recognised as being separate to the Lombok Treaty, was not a traditional defence treaty, and did not feature the same content as the earlier treaties or the 2012 DCA. Instead, the Joint Understanding acted as a set of rules both nations would agree to follow in accordance with the Lombok Treaty. It was believed the Joint Understanding came about as a result of a 2013 investigation that revealed espionage activities carried out by Australia in 2009, targeting then-Indonesian President Susilo Bambang Yudhoyono, as the agreement features the clause: "the Parties will not use any of their intelligence, including surveillance capacities, or other resources, in ways that would harm the interests of the Parties".

=== Defence Cooperation Agreement ===
On 29 August 2024, Indonesia and Australia signed the Defence Cooperation Agreement to strengthen the security ties. It was signed by Deputy Prime Minister and Minister for Defence, Richard Marles, and Indonesian President-elect and Minister of Defence, Prabowo Subianto at the Military Academy in Magelang, Central Java. The treaty-level agreement will allow for enhanced practical cooperation and interoperability between two armed forces in areas such as maritime security, counter terrorism, humanitarian and disaster relief, logistics support, education and training, as well as across defence industry, and would help prevent future security threats in the Asia-Pacific region through collaborative efforts to maintain peace and stability. Notably the agreement will enable more complex joint activities and exercises between the Australian Defence Force and Indonesian National Armed Forces, and for Australia and Indonesia to operate from each other's countries for mutually determined cooperative activities

=== Jakarta Treaty ===
On 12 November 2025, the Australian and Indonesian governments confirmed that they would sign a new defence treaty in January 2026 that would commit the two governments to consulting on both leadership and ministerial levels on security matters. Australian Prime Minister Anthony Albanese and Indonesian President Prabowo Subianto announced the agreement during Subianto's first state visit to Sydney in November. The treaty builds upon the 2024 Defence Cooperation Agreement, and is also based on a cancelled 1995 bilateral peace agreement signed between Australian Prime Minister Paul Keating and Indonesian President Soeharto.

The Treaty Between The Government of Australia and the Government of the Republic of Indonesia on Common Security ('Jakarta Treaty') was formally signed by Albanese and Prabowo in Jakarta on 6 February 2026.
