= Economy of Victoria (state) =

Economy of an Australian state

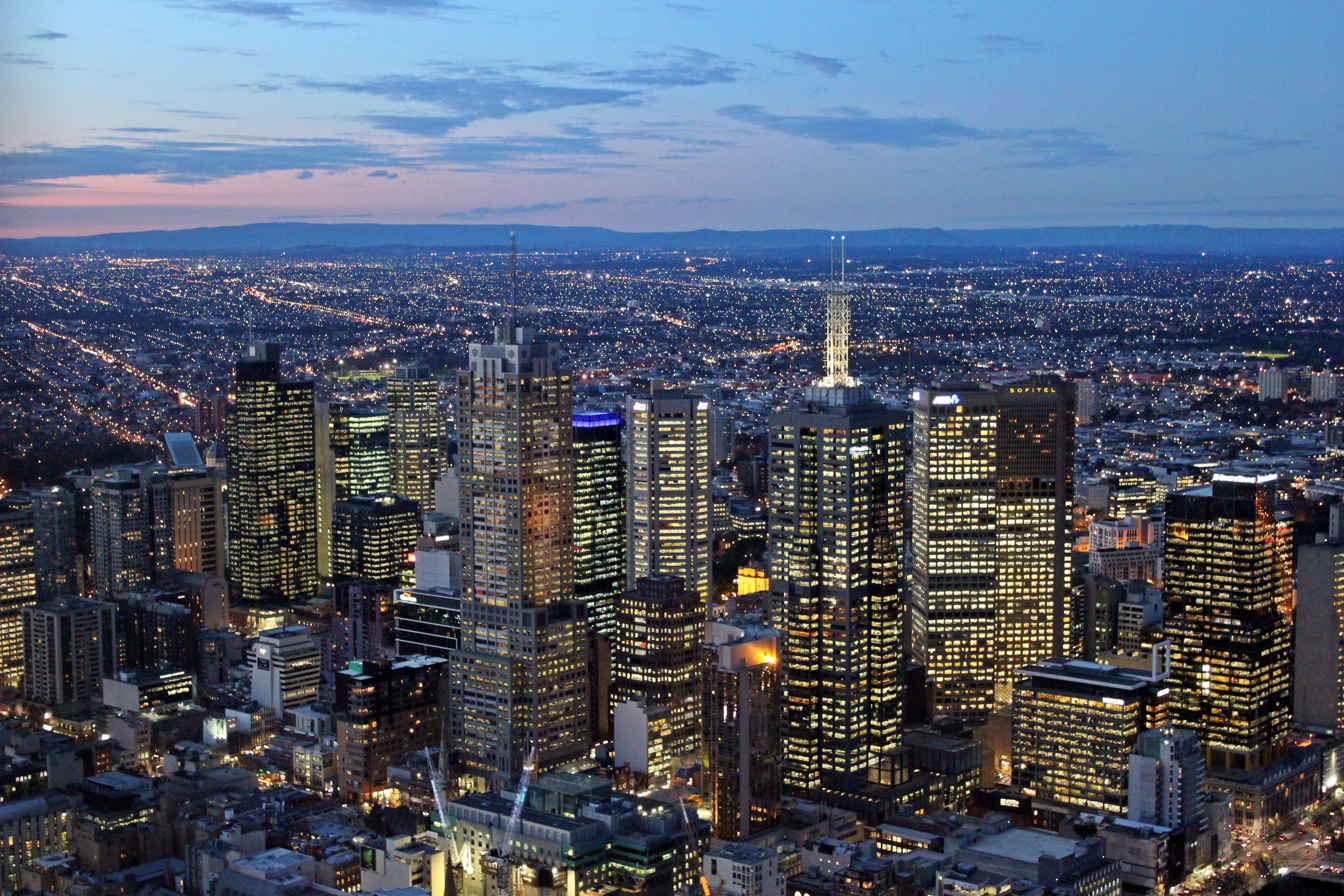
- Melbourne CBD area
- Currency: Australian dollar (A$ or AUD)
- Fiscal year: 1 July – 30 June

Statistics
- GDP: ▲AUD$515.2 billion (US$387.37 billion)(2022)
- GDP growth: ▼2.6% (2022/23)
- GDP per capita: ▲AUD$76,357 (US$57,411.28)(2021/22)
- Human Development Index: 0.948 (2021) very high
- Unemployment: ▼3.7% (2022/23)
- Main industries: Financial services, professional-technical services, healthcare, education, construction

External
- Exports: A$61.8 billion (2022/23)
- Export goods: wheat, meat, Pharm products, beef, wool, dairy product
- Main export partners: China 17.2% United States 12.5% New Zealand 8.1% Japan 7.2% South Korea 4.6%
- Imports: A$146.2 billion (2022/23)
- Import goods: Passenger and Goods motor vehicles, Refined and Crude petroleum, Pharm products
- Main import partners: China 27.2% United States 10.6% Germany 4.8% Thailand 4.6% Japan 4.5%

Public finances
- Government debt: A$116.7 billion (2022/23)
- Revenues: A$89.3 billion (2022/23)
- Expenses: A$93.3 billion (2022/23)
- All values, unless otherwise stated, are in US dollars.

The state of Victoria is the second-largest economy in Australia after New South Wales, accounting for 23.24% of the nation's gross domestic product, valued at A$515.2 billion in 2022. The economy is primarily built upon financial services, agriculture, healthcare and social assistance, tourism and construction. Victoria's main exports are agricultural and pharmaceutical products, while the largest employer in the state is the healthcare and social assistance sector.

== Economic history ==
Aboriginal Australians in Victoria primarily lived within a hunter-gatherer economic system with the effective adoption of the fire-stick farming method. In the early days of the 1820s, the pioneer European colonists arriving from the sea kept pushing the exploration boundary further inland to search for fertile grazing land.

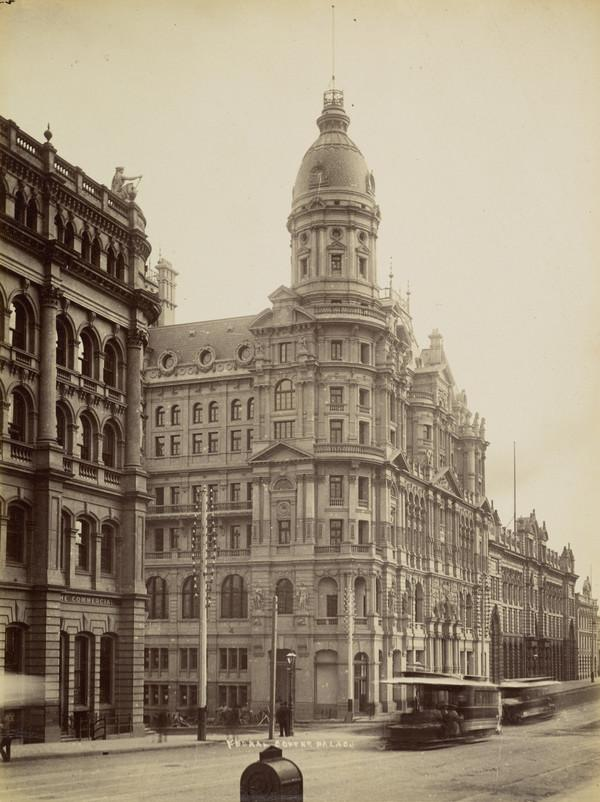
A boom period in the 1870s due to the discovery of gold led to the construction of many grand edifices and public buildings such as Melbourne's Federal Coffee Palace.

In 1851, gold was first discovered at Warrandyte which is 26 km (16 miles) from Melbourne, leading to rushes. By the end of 1851, half the population of the colony were working on the goldfields and new immigrants from Britain and China were flowing in rapidly. By 1860, the total population had reached 500,000 and constituted nearly half of the entire Australian colony population. Although true opportunities greatly contracted, Victoria was still reputed for its economic opportunism and individualism which further encourages material progress and financial speculation. However, the speculation was halted in the early 1890s with the collapse of financial institutions and plummets in export prices.

In the 20th century the Victorian economy was marked by slow growth with turbulence from time to time. Finance and manufacturing industries continue to grow as the traditionally pillar sectors of Victoria's economy, while other industries such as pharmaceutics, retail, oil refining were also growing. Large-scale state investment in infrastructure and high-tech industries were inconsistent due to political factors, while there had been a huge governmental debt accumulated over time. Victoria had also tried to structurally transform its economy by developing new industries such as tourism and other cultural industries, which had seen great progress.

Change of Gross State Product (GSP) from 1990 to 2021

== Labour market ==
In 2023 around 3.6 million people are employed in Victoria, increasing by 754,800 from the past decade. Over the decade, the labour participation rate increased by 2.8 points (from 64.8% to 67.6%), while the unemployment rate declined by 1.9 points (from 5.6% to 3.7%). Currently, 69.0% of Victorian workers are engaged in full-time work, an increase of 2.0% since 2019.

As of 2021 Healthcare and social assistance sector is the largest employer, with 14.1% of workforce in the industry, followed by construction (9.4%) and retail (9.4%).

=== Income tax ===
The state mainly relies on corporate tax, stamp duty and land taxes to gain an income. Victoria together with some other states such as New South Wales, ACT and Tasmania have not imposed state level income taxes since World War II. Personal income taxes are imposed on individuals rather than household unit, on a progressive basis, with higher rates applying to higher income levels.

== Sectors ==
=== Agriculture ===
Victoria is Australia's second-largest agricultural producer in gross value of production, representing about 25 percent of Australia's total food production. There are 67,600 people employed in the agricultural industry, making it the 6th largest employer in the state. There are about 21,600 farms in the state, managing more than 11.4 million hectares or 50% of the state's total landmass, of which 40% was used for cropping and 50% for grazing. Victorian farms produce nearly 90% of Australian pears and a third of apples. The main vegetable crops include asparagus, broccoli, carrots, potatoes, and tomatoes.

More than 14 million sheep and 5 million lambs graze over 10% of Victorian farms, mostly in the state's north and west. In 2004, nearly 10 million lambs and sheep were slaughtered for local consumption and export. Victoria also exports live sheep to the Middle East for meat and to the rest of the world for breeding. More than 108,000 metric tons (119,000 short tons) of wool clip was also produced—one-fifth of the Australian total.121,200 metric tons (133,600 short tons) of pears and 270,000 metric tons (300,000 short tons) of tomatoes were produced. Fisheries and aquaculture make up for 14% of the agricultural production value.

=== Construction ===
Construction in Victoria is one of the fastest growing industry especially since the COVID-19 pandemic. The industry grew 4.1% in 2022 driven by high levels of public investments, which relatively offset the inadequacy in residential construction arising from material and labour shortage. There were 127,370 registered companies in the Victoria construction industry by 2022, making it the largest industry by the number of registered firms.

=== Financial services ===
Financial services is the largest industry in Victoria, accounting for A$49.3 billion in Gross Value Add, representing 11 percent of Victoria's Gross State Product and employing approximately 130,000 people in 2020. Melbourne is one of the most famous financial hubs in the world.

=== Tourism ===
Victoria has a vibrant tourism industry, contributing an estimate of A$31.5 billion to the Gross State Product while creating more than 501,400 jobs in 2021. More than 83.1 million tourists visit Victoria in 2022, back to 83% of the pre-pandemic result (year ending December 2019). Victoria is the second most visited destination in the country and Melbourne is one of the most liveable cities worldwide. The state government has also committed to invest A$633 million into the visitor economy in the Visitor Economy Recovery Reform Plan (VERRP) to boost the industry and reach the goal of A$35 billion in annual visitor expenditure and 300,000 jobs creation by June 2024.

== See also ==
- Economy of Australia
- Victorian Chamber of Commerce and Industry
