= National Firearms Agreement =

1996 agreement concerning firearm controls in Australia

The National Firearms Agreement (NFA), also sometimes called the National Agreement on Firearms, the National Firearms Agreement and Buyback Program, or the Nationwide Agreement on Firearms, is an agreement concerning firearm control made by the Australasian Police Ministers' Council (APMC) in 1996, in response to the Port Arthur massacre that killed 35 people. Four days after the killings, Prime Minister John Howard told Parliament “We need to achieve a total prohibition on the ownership, possession, sale and importation of all automatic and semi-automatic weapons. That will be the essence of the proposal that will be put by the Commonwealth government at the meeting on Friday...". The APMC would agree to and form the NFA 12 days after the massacre on 10 May 1996.

The NFA placed tight control on semi-automatic and fully automatic weapons but permitted their use by a small number of licensed individuals who required them for a purpose other than "personal protection". The Act included a gun buy-back provision.

Negotiation and implementation of the Agreement was originally coordinated in 1996 by Prime Minister Howard. Since then the Agreement has continued to have support from both Labor and Coalition Federal Governments.

The Australian Police Ministers Council (APMC), comprising state and federal police ministers, meets at least every six months at which issues including the NFA are discussed. Changes to the NFA require the unanimous agreement of all governments. At a meeting on 21 October 2016, it was agreed to hold a firearm amnesty by mid-2017.

A 2006 study found that in the decade after the gun law reforms, there were no fatal mass shootings and a decrease in firearm deaths, particularly suicides. The authors concluded that the removal of large numbers of rapid-firing firearms from the population may be an effective way to reduce mass shootings and firearm homicides and suicides.

== Provisions ==
The Agreement includes a number of provisions. It was agreed to establish a temporary firearm buyback program for firearms that were once legal now made illegal, that according to the Council on Foreign Relations bought over 650,000 firearms. This program, which cost $230 million, was paid for by an increase in the country's taxes.

The law created a national firearm registry, a 28-day waiting period for firearm sales, and tightened firearm licensing rules. The law requires anyone wishing to possess or use a firearm with some exceptions, be over the age of 12. Owners must be at least 18 years of age, have secure storage for their firearms and provide a "genuine reason" for doing so.

In April 2024, national cabinet agreed to set up a national gun registry following the death of two police officers in Wieambilla, Queensland. This will take up to four years to become fully functional.

== Effectiveness ==
In 1998, the prime minister appointed the Australian Institute of Criminology to monitor the effects of the gun buyback. The institute has published a number of papers reporting trends and statistics around gun ownership and gun crime, which it has found to be mostly related to illegally held firearms. A 2013 report by the Australian Crime Commission said a conservative estimate was that there were 250,000 longarms and 10,000 handguns in the nation's illicit firearms market. The number of guns imported to Australia legally has also risen. A 2014 report stated that approximately "260,000 guns are on the Australian 'grey' or black markets".

Research by Philip Alpers of the University of Sydney found that Australia experienced 69 gun homicides in 1996 (not counting the Port Arthur massacre), compared to 30 in 2012. The drop in firearm homicides was not attributed to the national firearms agreement. A 2006 study led by Simon Chapman, also of the University of Sydney, found that after the NFA was passed, the country experienced more than a decade without mass shootings and accelerated falls in gun deaths, especially suicides. Samara McPhedran and Jeanine Baker, researchers for gun lobby group Women in Shooting and Hunting (WiSH), considered whether the NFA had any effect in eliminating mass shootings by using New Zealand (a country with many similarities to Australia) as a comparison and found; “there is little support for the proposition that prohibiting certain types of firearms explains the absence of mass shootings in Australia since 1996”.

Another study by Baker and McPhedran in 2007 did not find a significant effect of the NFA on Australia's homicide rate. While research does show a steady decline in gun-related suicides, the reduction occurred at the same time as an overall reduction in the Australian suicide rate. What's more, firearm-related suicides had been declining in Australia for nearly ten years before the 1996 restrictions on gun ownership. A 2009 study also found that firearm suicide rates were decreasing in Australia before the NFA was passed, and concluded that "The implemented restrictions may not be responsible for the observed reductions in firearms suicide." Baker and McPhedran's 2007 study has been criticized by David Hemenway, who has written that the authors, who chose 1979 as the starting point for their trend analysis, failed to explain why they assumed the gun violence rate would continue to decline. Hemenway also criticized their study for using a counterfactual that assumed that this decline would continue forever.

Suicide reduction from firearm regulation is disputed by Richard Harding in his 1981 book "Firearms and Violence in Australian Life" where, after reviewing Australian statistics, he said that "whatever arguments might be made for the limitation or regulation of the private ownership of firearms, suicide patterns do not constitute one of them" Harding quoted international analysis by Newton and Zimring of twenty developed countries which concluded at page 36 of their report; “cultural factors appear to affect suicide rates far more than the availability and use of firearms. Thus, suicide rates would not seem to be readily affected by making firearms less available."

University of Melbourne researchers Wang-Sheng Lee and Sandy Suardi concluded their 2008 report, "There is little evidence to suggest that the Australian mandatory gun-buyback program had any significant effects on firearm homicides."

More recently, a 2010 study by Andrew Leigh and Christine Neill found that, in the decade after the NFA, non-gun homicide rates fell by 59% and gun homicides fell by the same 59% with gun suicide rates falling by 65%. Howard cited this as showing Australia had been right to adopt the NFA but he omitted to mention the same fall in the non-gun homicide rate. Others have argued that alternative methods of suicide have been substituted. De Leo, Dwyer, Firman & Neulinger, studied suicide methods in men from 1979 to 1998 and found a rise in hanging suicides that started slightly before the fall in gun suicides. As hanging suicides rose at about the same rate as gun suicides fell, it is possible that there was some substitution of suicide methods. It has been noted that drawing strong conclusions about possible impacts of gun laws on suicides is challenging, because a number of suicide prevention programs were implemented from the mid-1990s onwards, and non-firearm suicides also began falling.

A 2015 study found that in the two years following the NFA's enactment, rates of armed robbery and attempted murder decreased significantly relative to rates of sexual assault, but that the evidence was less clear with regard to changes in the rate of unarmed robbery following the law.

In 2016, Samara McPhedran, a Griffith University academic and chair of the International Coalition for Women in Shooting and Hunting, reviewed the literature on the NFA and homicide and reported that of the five studies she found on the topic, "No study found statistical evidence of any significant impact of the legislative changes on firearm homicide rates."

Simon Chapman and colleagues reported in 2016 that there were no mass shootings in Australia between when the NFA became law and May 2016. The same study also found that "there was a more rapid decline in firearm deaths between 1997 and 2013 compared with before 1997 but also a decline in total nonfirearm suicide and homicide deaths of a greater magnitude." For this reason, the authors concluded that it was impossible to say definitively whether the reduction in firearm-related deaths can be attributed to the NFA.

A 2017 study commissioned by Gun Control Australia found that Australian states had significantly weakened gun laws since the NFA was first introduced, with no jurisdiction fully compliant with the NFA. For example, many states now allow children to use guns and the mandatory 28-day cooling-off period required for gun purchases has been relaxed in many jurisdictions, with no waiting period for purchasers who already own at least one gun. New South Wales also allows the limited use of silencers, even though they are supposed to be a prohibited weapon. No state or territory has outlined a timeframe for achieving full compliance with the NFA.

Australia's gun laws remain extremely popular with the public, with little to no will for turning them back. According to an Essential Research poll conducted in 2018, "62% believe Australia's gun laws are about right and 25% think they are too weak. Only 7% think they are too strict."

== See also ==
- Gun laws in Australia
- Bipartisanship in Australia
