= Gun laws of Australia =

Overview of the gun laws in Australia

Firearm restrictions in Australia primarily fall under the jurisdiction of Australian states and territories, while the federal government oversees the importation of firearms. During the last two decades of the 20th century, in response to several high-profile mass shootings, the federal government worked closely with state governments to implement more stringent firearms legislation.

Gun laws were largely aligned in 1996 by the National Firearms Agreement which introduced stricter gun control measures and explicitly made gun ownership a privilege. In two federally funded gun buybacks and voluntary surrenders and State Governments' gun amnesties before and after the Port Arthur Massacre, more than a million firearms were collected and destroyed, possibly a third of the national stock. Since then the Agreement has continued to have support from both Labor and Coalition Federal Governments. In December 2023 the National Cabinet agreed to implement a national firearms register within four years.

A person must have a firearm licence to possess or use a firearm. Licence holders must be able to demonstrate at least one "genuine reason" (which explicitly excludes self-defence) for holding a firearm licence and must not be a "prohibited person". All firearms must be registered by serial number to the owner.

According to a 2025 review by The Australia Institute, while the National Firearms Agreement significantly improved public safety, the number of registered firearms has increased by approximately 25% since 1996. They noted emerging threats such as 3D-printed guns and recommended strengthening firearm regulations.

In December 2025, a proposed national gun buy-back was announced by prime minister Anthony Albanese following the Bondi Beach shooting.

== National legislative structure ==
Following the shooting incidents at Port Arthur in 1996 and Monash University in 2002 the Australian state and territory governments, through the then Australian Police Ministers' Council (APMC) and Council of Australian Governments (COAG), entered into three national agreements that were responsible for shaping contemporary Australian firearm laws. These agreements were the:

- National Firearms Agreement (1996)
- National Firearm Trafficking Policy Agreement (2002)
- National Handgun Control Agreement (2002).

The ownership, possession and use of firearms in Australia is regulated by state and territory laws:

- New South Wales: Firearms Act 1996, Weapons Prohibition Act 1998, and associated regulations
- Victoria: Firearms Act 1996 and associated regulations
- Queensland: Weapons Act 1990 and associated regulations
- Western Australia: Firearms Act 2024 and associated regulations
- South Australia: Firearms Act 2015 and associated regulations
- Tasmania: Firearms Act 1996 and associated regulations
- Northern Territory: Firearms Act 1997 and associated regulations
- Australian Capital Territory: Firearms Act 1996, Prohibited Weapons Act 1996, and associated regulations.

At the federal level, the importation of firearms is subject to the restrictions in Regulation 4F and Schedule 6 of the Customs (Prohibited Imports) Regulations 1956 (Cth).

In 2024, the Western Australian government introduced a cap on the number of firearms a licensed individual can possess with farmers and competition shooters limited to ten firearms and recreational hunters limited to five. In December 2025, the New South Wales parliament passed similar laws, which have yet to take effect, which will impose a limit on farmers and competition shooters of ten firearms and a limit of four firearms for recreational hunters.

== Firearms categories ==
The National Firearm Agreement defines categories of firearms, with different levels of control for each, as follows:

Category A
Rimfire rifles (not semi-automatic), shotguns (not pump-action, semi-automatic, or lever-action) & air rifles (including semi-automatic).
Category B
Centrefire rifles including bolt-action, pump-action and lever-action (not semi-automatic), muzzleloading firearms made after 1 January 1901 and lever-action shotguns with a magazine capacity of up to five rounds.
Category C
Pump-action or self-loading shotguns having a magazine capacity of 5 or fewer rounds and semi-automatic rimfire rifles up to 10 rounds. Primary producers, farm workers, firearm dealers, firearm safety officers, collectors and clay target shooters can own functional Category C firearms. In Western Australia, Category C shotguns may be owned by sporting shooters who participate in practical shotgun competitions. This is generally limited to second-hand shotguns.
Category D
All self-loading centrefire rifles, pump-action or self-loading or lever-action shotguns that have a magazine capacity of more than five rounds, semi-automatic rimfire rifles over ten rounds, are restricted to government agencies, occupational shooters and primary producers.
Category H
Handguns can be owned for a number of "genuine reasons" including target shooting, occupational (security guard and prison guard), carrying on behalf of a junior, and official, commercial or prescribed purposes authorised by an Act or Regulation. For target shooters, a paid membership to an approved pistol club is mandated.
Handguns allowed for target shooting are divided into four classes:

1. Air handgun
2. Rimfire handgun
3. Centrefire handgun with a calibre of .38 inches (9.7 mm) or less, or a black powder handgun
4. Centrefire handgun with a calibre of more than .38 inch but not more than .45 inches (11 mm)

The amount of shooting participation that a licensed target shooter is obliged to complete is solely determined by the number of classes of handguns that are legally "owned" by that person — not the actual quantity of handguns owned. A minimum number of matches is required yearly to retain ownership for each class of handgun and continue being a paid-up member of an approved pistol club, and it varies between states.
To be eligible for a Category H Licence, a target shooter must serve a probationary period of at least 6 months and have to participate a minimum number of shooting sessions using club handguns, after which they are required to leave a fingerprint record with the police before applying for a permit. Target shooters are limited to handguns below .38 or 9mm calibers, and magazines may hold a maximum of 10 rounds. Participants in certain "approved" pistol competitions (currently only Single Action Shooting and Metallic Silhouette) may acquire handguns up to .45 caliber. IPSC shooting is approved for 9mm/.38/.357 SIG for handguns that meet the IPSC rules. Larger calibres such as .45 were approved for IPSC contests in Victoria in 2014. The barrel must be at least 100 mm (3.94 in) long for revolvers, and 120 mm (4.72 in) for semi-automatic pistols, unless the pistols are clearly ISSF target pistols.
Centrefire handguns with a caliber greater than .45 are considered restricted firearms, whose ownership require a Category R/E Licence (see below).

Category R/E
Restricted weapons include military weapons such as machine guns, rocket launchers, full automatic self-loading rifles, flamethrowers and anti-tank guns in some states.

Certain antique firearms (generally muzzleloading black powder flintlock firearms manufactured before 1 January 1901) can in some states be legally held without a licence. In other states they are subject to the same requirements as modern firearms.

In certain states, firearms that "substantially duplicates military-style rifles in design, function or appearance" are subjected to harsher regulations. Some jurisdictions apply appearance‑based criteria when classifying firearms. Under these provisions, a firearm may be placed in a more restrictive category if regulators determine that it has a "military‑style" appearance, regardless of its internal mechanism.

== Licensing ==
The states issue firearms licences upon satisfying the requirement for a genuine reason, such as hunting, sport shooting, pest control, collecting and for farmers and farm workers. Self-defence is explicitly excluded as a genuine reason. Licences must be renewed every 3 or 5 years (or 10 years in the Northern Territory, South Australia & Queensland). Full licence-holders must be at least 18 years of age.

Junior licences in Victoria and New South Wales are available from 12 years of age (Or 11 if in Queensland), this allows the use of firearms for the purpose of receiving instruction in the use of the firearm or engaging in sport or target shooting competitions.

Licences are prohibited for convicted offenders and those with a history of mental illness.

In May 2018 Victoria introduced firearm prohibition orders to reduce firearm related-crime by targeting those who want to possess, use or carry firearms for unlawful purposes. The person served with an order must immediately surrender any firearm or firearm related item in their possession and the firearms licence is cancelled.

Persons or companies conducting a business involving the buying, selling or trading of firearms or ammunition must obtain a firearm dealers licence, and firearms repairers must hold a firearms repairer's licence. These must be renewed annually.

== Compliance with National Firearms Agreement ==
A 2017 study commissioned by Gun Control Australia found that Australian states had significantly weakened gun laws since the National Firearms Agreement was first introduced, with no jurisdiction fully compliant with the Agreement. For example, many states now allow children to fire guns under strict supervision and the mandatory 28 day cooling-off period required for gun purchases has been relaxed, with no waiting period for purchasers who already own at least one gun. New South Wales also allows the limited use of moderators via a permit even though they are supposed to be a prohibited weapon. No state or territory has outlined a timeframe for achieving full compliance with the National Firearms Agreement.

A 2019 study commissioned by Gun Control Australia stated that in the past 20 years, the number of hunters, sporting shooters, and licensed gun owners in Australia has declined, while the total number of firearms has increased. Despite extensive gun law reforms following the 1996 Port Arthur massacre, the number of privately owned firearms in Australia has increased. As of the latest available data, there are over four million registered firearms nationwide—25% more than in 1996—and nearly one million firearm licenses issued across states and territories. NSW has the most guns, with 1,125,553 registered firearms, followed by Queensland with 1,076,140 registered firearms.

== State-specific changes ==
=== Queensland developments (2024–2025) ===
In June 2024, Queensland enacted a Firearm Prohibition Order (FPO) scheme under the Community Safety Act, empowering police to temporarily prohibit individuals deemed "high‑risk" from possessing, using, or acquiring firearms, and to conduct compliance searches on their person, vehicles, or residence.

As of July 2025, amendments to the Explosives Act 1999 require electronic verification of firearms licences before any small-arms ammunition sale, whether in-store or online, aiming to enhance regulatory compliance.

A black market gun crisis in Queensland came to light in early 2025, with over 3,000 firearms reported stolen in the previous five years and more than 2,000 still missing. In 2024–25, police revoked 870 firearm licences due to disqualifying factors (e.g., domestic violence, mental health concerns), and launched Operation Whiskey Firestorm—a crackdown on illicit firearm ownership.

3D‑printed firearms are increasingly being found in Queensland, prompting concerns about legal loopholes. Unlike NSW and Tasmania, Queensland currently does not criminalise downloading or producing illicit firearm blueprints.

In mid‑2025, the state made "Jack's Law" permanent, mandating police powers to use handheld scanners ("wanding") in all public places—without warrants and with only senior officer approval—to detect weapons. Over 100,000 individuals were scanned, resulting in 2,800 charges and over 1,000 weapons seized during the trial period.

==== Western Australia ====
===== Firearms Act reforms (2024–2025) =====
In December 2024, Western Australia passed sweeping reforms to its firearms legislation, becoming one of the strictest in Australia. Effective 31 March 2025, these include:

- Caps on number of firearms an individual may own (e.g. maximum of five)
- Bans on lever-release and button-release firearms and many lever‑action .22 rifles
- Limitations on magazine capacities: centrefire rifles capped at 10 rounds, turn‑bolt and straight‑pull shotguns limited to 5 rounds

A voluntary gun buyback scheme ran through August 2024, funded at A$64.3 million. Financial and administrative support measures were introduced to help licensed owners transition to new requirements.

==== New South Wales ====
===== "Right to hunt" bill under review =====
A proposed bill from the Shooters, Fishers and Farmers Party seeks to:

- Enshrine a legal "right to hunt"
- Create a new hunting authority
- Introduce a bounty system for feral animals

Critics—including Port Arthur massacre survivor Walter Mikac—argue it weakens gun law gains. The government has reiterated it will not dilute core restrictions.

== History ==
=== European settlement to 19th century ===
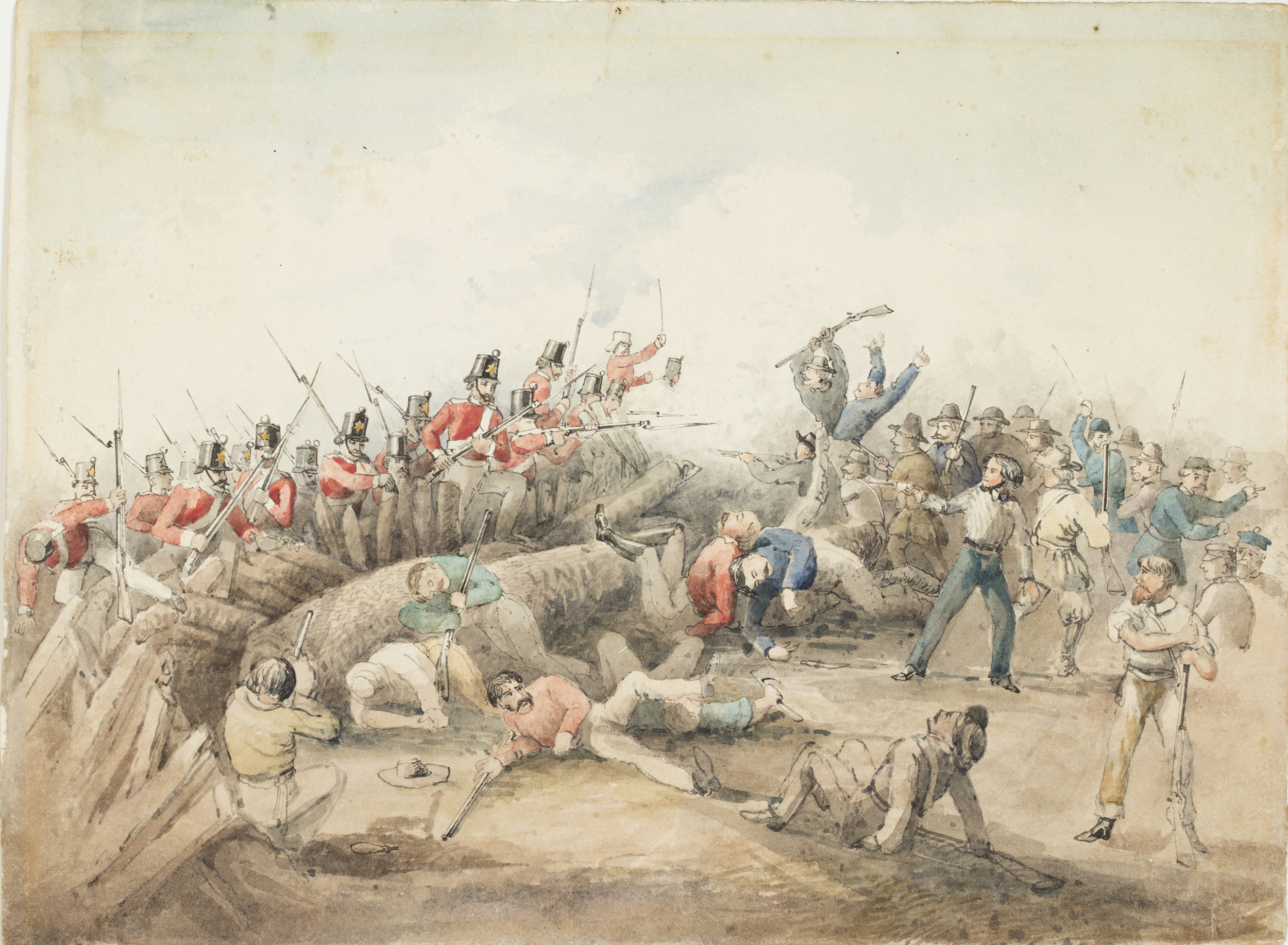
Firearms were used by European settlers during the Australian frontier wars and the Eureka Rebellion.

Firearms were introduced to Australia with the arrival of the First Fleet in January of 1788, though other seafarers that visited Australia before settlement also carried firearms. The colony of New South Wales was initially a penal settlement, with the military garrison being armed. Firearms were also used for hunting, protection of persons and crops, in crime and fighting crime, and in many military engagements. From the landing of the First Fleet there was conflict with Aboriginal people over game, access to fenced land, and spearing of livestock. Firearms were used by explorers and settlers to shoot Aboriginals, often without provocation. A number of punitive raids were carried out in a series of local conflicts.

The firearms issued to convicts (for meat hunting) and settlers (for hunting and protection) were stolen and misused, resulting in more controls. In January 1796, Colonel David Collins wrote that "several attempts had been made to ascertain the number of arms in the possession of individuals, as many were feared to be in the hands of those who committed depredations; the crown recalled but of between two and three hundred arms which belonged to the crown, not more than 50 were accounted for".

European-Australian colonists also used firearms in conflict with bushrangers and armed rebellions such as the 1804 Castle Hill convict rebellion and the 1854 Eureka Stockade.

=== 20th century ===
Gun laws were the responsibility of each colony and, since Federation in 1901, of each state. The Commonwealth does not have constitutional authority over firearms, but it has jurisdiction over customs and defence matters. Federally the external affairs powers can be used to enforce internal control over matters agreed in external treaties.

In New South Wales, handguns were effectively banned after World War II but the 1956 Melbourne Olympic Games sparked a new interest in the sport of pistol shooting and laws were changed to allow the sport to develop.

In some jurisdictions, individuals may also be subject to firearm prohibition orders (FPOs), which give police additional powers to search and question the individual for firearms or ammunition without a warrant. FPOs have been available in New South Wales since 1973, and are also used in Victoria.

In October 2016, it was estimated that there were 260,000 unregistered guns in Australia, 250,000 long arms and 10,000 handguns, most of them in the hands of organised crime groups and other criminals. There are 3 million registered firearms in Australia.

In March 2017, there were 915,000 registered firearms in New South Wales, 18,967 in the ACT, 298,851 in South Australia, and 126,910 in Tasmania. The other jurisdictions did not make the information public.

In 2015, there were more private firearms in Australia than there were before the Port Arthur massacre, when 1 million firearms were destroyed. Since 1988, the proportion of households with a firearm has fallen by 75%. Some of the increase may be associated with increased wild harvest of kangaroo meat.

There has been an incremental move since the 1970s for police forces in the eight jurisdictions in Australia to routinely carry exposed firearms while on duty. In the 1970s the norm was for police to carry a baton, with only NSW police carrying firearms. Since then, police have been authorised to carry a covered firearm, and more recently to carry an exposed firearm. The shift has taken place without public debate or a proper assessment of the vulnerability of police officers, but has taken place with public acquiescence.

=== 1984–1996 multiple killings ===
From 1984 to 1996, multiple killings aroused public concern. The 1984 Milperra massacre was a major incident in a series of conflicts between various "outlaw motorcycle gangs". In 1987, the Hoddle Street massacre and the Queen Street massacre took place in Melbourne. In response, several states required the registration of all guns, and restricted the availability of self-loading rifles and shotguns. In the Strathfield massacre in New South Wales, 1991, two were killed with a knife, and five more with a firearm. Tasmania passed a law in 1991 for firearm purchasers to obtain a licence, though enforcement was light. Firearm laws in Tasmania and Queensland remained relatively relaxed for longarms.

==== Port Arthur massacre ====
The Port Arthur massacre took place in 1996 when the 29 year old gunman Martin Bryant opened fire on shop owners and tourists with two semi-automatic rifles that left 35 people dead and 23 wounded. This mass killing horrified the Australian government and transformed gun control legislation in Australia.

Prime Minister John Howard pressured the states to adopt the gun law proposals made in a report of the 1988 National Committee on Violence as the National Firearms Agreement, resulting in the non-binding National Firearms Agreement (NFA) between the Commonwealth and the States & Territories as the Constitution of Australia does not give the Commonwealth direct power to enact gun laws. In the face of some state resistance, Howard threatened to hold a nationwide referendum to alter the Constitution of Australia to give the Commonwealth constitutional power over guns. The National Firearms Agreement included heavy restrictions on all semi-automatic rifles and all semi-automatic and pump-action shotguns, and a system of licensing and ownership controls.

The Howard government held a series of public meetings to explain the proposed changes. At the first meeting, Howard wore a bullet-resistant vest, which was visible under his jacket. Many shooters were critical of this. Some firearm owners applied to join the Liberal Party in an attempt to influence the government, but the party barred them from membership. A court action by 500 shooters seeking admission to membership eventually failed in the Supreme Court of South Australia.

Section 51(xxxi) of the Constitution of Australia requires 'just terms' (financial compensation) for property that is compulsorily acquired, so the federal government introduced the Medicare Levy Amendment Act 1996 to raise the predicted cost of A$500 million through a one-off increase in the Medicare levy. The 'gun buy back scheme' started on 1 October 1996 and concluded on 30 September 1997. The Australian National Audit Office reported that the scheme compulsorily acquired more than 640,000 firearms, many of which were semi-automatic rifles and shotguns (restricted as a result of the 1996 legislative changes) or old, antique and dysfunctional firearms.

=== Monash University shootings ===
In October 2002, a commerce student killed two fellow students at Monash University in Victoria with pistols he had acquired as a member of a shooting club. The gunman, Huan Yun Xiang, was acquitted of crimes related to the shootings due to mental impairment but ordered to be detained in Thomas Embling Hospital, a high-security hospital for up to 25 years.

As in 1996, the Commonwealth Government, States and Territories agreed on a series of legislative changes known as the National Handgun Control Agreement (2002), resulting in the National Handgun Buyback Act 2003, which provided Commonwealth funding for compulsory acquisition of handguns not meeting certain technical criteria. These changes were passed by State and Territory parliaments during 2003. Changes included a 10-round magazine capacity limit, a calibre limit of not more than .38 inches (9.65 mm) (since expanded under certain criteria), a barrel length limit of not less than 120 mm (4.72 inches) for semi-automatic pistols and 100 mm (3.94 inches) for revolvers, and new shooter probation and attendance requirements for handgun target shooters. Whilst handguns for sporting shooters are nominally restricted to .38 inches as a maximum calibre, it is possible to obtain an endorsement or special permit allowing the purchase and use of pistols with calibre up to .45 inches (11.43 mm) to be used for Metallic silhouette shooting or Single Action Shooting matches.

The 2003 changes contained an option for licensed handgun target shooters to have all handguns (including those not prohibited by the 2003 changes) to be compulsorily acquired in exchange for the voluntary surrender of their Category H (Handgun) licence for a period of five years.

=== 2014 Sydney hostage crisis ===
On 15–16 December 2014, gunman Man Haron Monis, held hostage 17 customers and employees of a Lindt chocolate café located at Martin Place in Sydney, Australia. The perpetrator was on bail at the time and had previously been convicted of a range of offences. Two of the hostages and the perpetrator died.

In August 2015, NSW Premier Mike Baird and Police Minister Troy Grant announced a tightening of laws on bail and illegal firearms, creating a new offence for the possession of a stolen firearm, with a maximum of 14 years imprisonment and establishing an Illegal Firearms Investigation and Reward Scheme. This legislative change also introduced measures to reduce illegal firearms in NSW including a ban on the possession of digital blueprints that enable firearms to be manufactured using 3D printers and milling machines for anyone without an appropriate licence.

=== Adler A110 shotgun recategorisation controversy ===
In 2015, the importation of the Adler A110 lever-action shotgun into Australia generated controversy. The firearm itself could hold up to 7+1 rounds (possible 10+1) in its magazine, a relatively high capacity for a shotgun, and its ability to deliver relatively fast follow-up shots as a lever-action firearm. Most controversially, it was a Category A firearm, making it accessible to nearly all licensed shooters. This resulted in an importation ban on A110 shotguns with a capacity over five rounds (up to five rounds was still permitted for importation). Lever-action shotguns with a magazine capacity over five rounds were later reclassified as Category D firearms.

=== 2025 Bondi Beach shooting ===
On the evening of Sunday 14 December 2025, an Islamic State (ISIS)-inspired terrorist attack occurred at Archer Park, Bondi Beach in Sydney, New South Wales, during a large public celebration of the Jewish festival of Hannukah. Two armed men opened fire on the crowd gathered for the event reportedly with a straight pull bolt action rifle and a shotgun, firing from a footbridge overlooking the area. Sixteen people were killed including one of the gunmen and forty people were injured and taken to a hospital, including one of the alleged gunmen. The incident was declared a terrorist attack and authorities described the motive as antisemitism. The attack was Australia's second deadliest mass shooting and has sparked a renewed debate on gun control in Australia. One of the gunmen had a firearms licence and was the registered owner of six firearms. A national gun buy-back was announced in the wake of the mass shooting.

=== Gun amnesties ===
There have been 28 state and territory-based amnesties since Port Arthur. The 1996 national amnesty and 'buyback' scheme ran for 12 months from October 1996 to September 1997 as part of the National Firearms Agreement which resulted in the removal of almost 650,000 firearms. There was also a six-month national handgun buyback in 2003 as part of the National Handgun Control Agreement (2002) resulting in the surrender of 68,727 handguns nationally.

In New South Wales there have been three gun amnesties: in 2001, 2003 and 2009. 63,000 handguns were handed in during the first two amnesties and over 4,323 handguns were handed in during the third amnesty. During the third amnesty 21,615 firearm registrations were received by the Firearms Registry. The surrendered firearms were all destroyed.

Advertising for the 2017 National Firearms Amnesty

In 2015, Liverpool had the highest number of registered firearms in Sydney, with 4,689 owned by 1,732 residents. Chester Hill and Sefton ranked second-highest with 4,505 registered firearms.

Between 1 July and 30 September 2017, there was a national firearms amnesty to hand in unregistered or unwanted firearms. The amnesty had been approved in March 2017 by the Firearms and Weapons Policy Working Group (FWPWG) to reduce the number of unregistered firearms in Australia following the Lindt Cafe siege in 2014, and the 2015 shooting of an unarmed police civilian finance worker outside the New South Wales Police Force headquarters in Parramatta, Sydney.

The firearms amnesty was the first national amnesty since the 1996 Port Arthur massacre. In October 2017 Prime Minister Malcolm Turnbull said that 51,000 unregistered firearms were surrendered during the three-month amnesty, of the previous estimate of 260,000 unregistered guns.

It has been estimated that, as at 2017, there were 3,158,795 firearms in private hands in Australia, of which 414,205 were unregistered. This represents 14.5 firearms per 100 people.

In July 2021, the Federal Government introduced a permanent gun amnesty.

== Efficacy measurement ==
=== Trends in related social problems ===
Some studies on the effects of Australia's gun laws have suggested that Australia's gun laws have been effective in reducing mass shootings, gun suicides and armed crime, while other studies suggest that the laws have had little effect. Polling shows strong support for gun legislation in Australia with around 85 to 90% of people wanting the same or greater level of restrictions. Nevertheless, conservative estimates are that there may be about 260,000 unregistered or prohibited firearms in the community, including assault rifles.

Between 1991 and 2001, the number of firearm-related deaths in Australia declined by 47%. Suicides committed with firearms accounted for 77% of these deaths, followed by firearms homicide (15%), firearms accidents (5%), firearms deaths resulting from legal intervention and undetermined deaths (2%). The number of firearms suicides was in decline consistently from 1991 to 1998, two years after the introduction of firearm regulation in 1996.

Suicide deaths using firearms more than halved in ten years, from 389 deaths in 1995, to 147 deaths in 2005. This is equal to 7% of all suicides in 2005. Over the same period, suicides by hanging increased by over 52% from 699 in 1995 to 1068 in 2005.

The number of guns stolen fell from an average 4,195 per year from 1994 to 2000 to 1,526 in 2006–2007. Long guns are more often stolen opportunistically in home burglaries, but few homes have handguns and a substantial proportion of stolen handguns are taken from security firms and other businesses; only a small proportion, 0.06% of licensed firearms, are stolen in a given year. A small proportion of those firearms are reported to be recovered. About 3% of these stolen weapons are later connected to an actual crime or found in the possession of a person charged with a serious offence. As of 2011 and 2012, pistols and semi-automatic pistols were traded on the black market for ten to twenty thousand dollars.

=== Research ===
In 1981, Richard Harding, after reviewing Australian and other data at that time, said that "whatever arguments might be made for the limitation or regulation of the private ownership of firearms, suicide patterns do not constitute one of them. " He quoted a 1968 international analysis of 20 developed countries "cultural factors appear to affect suicide rates far more than the availability and use of firearms. Thus, suicide rates would not seem to be readily affected by making firearms less available". In 1985, he supported laws to restrict gun ownership in New South Wales, saying contributions to slowing the growth of the Australian gun inventory are to be welcomed.

In 1997, the Prime Minister, John Howard appointed the Australian Institute of Criminology to monitor the effects of the gun buyback. The institute has published a number of papers reporting trends and statistics around gun ownership and gun crime.

In 2002, Jenny Mouzos from the Australian Institute of Criminology examined the rate of firearm theft in Australian states in territories following the firearm regulation. She found that "the NFA... is having the desired effect: securely stored firearms are proving less vulnerable to theft."

In 2003, researchers from the Monash University Accident Research Centre examined firearm deaths and mortality in the years before and after firearm regulation. They concluded that there was "dramatic" reduction in firearm deaths and especially suicides due to "the implementation of strong regulatory reform".

In 2005, Don Weatherburn of the NSW Bureau of Crime Statistics and Research stated that the 1996 legislation had little to no effect on violence saying the "laws did not result in any acceleration of the downward trend in gun homicide."

Multiple studies have been conducted by Jeanine Baker and Samara McPhedran, researchers with the International Coalition for Women in Shooting and Hunting (WiSH). In 2006 their paper on the 1996 firearms legislation in the British Journal of Criminology used an ARIMA analysis and found little evidence for an impact of the laws on homicide, but did for suicide. Don Weatherburn described the article as "reputable" and "well-conducted" but also stated that "it would be wrong to infer from the study that it does not matter how many guns there are in the community." Simon Chapman stated the article ignored the Mass Shootings issue such as the Port Arthur Massacre. In 2012, McPhedran and Baker found there was little evidence for any impacts of the gun laws on firearm suicide among people under 35 years of age, and suggested that the significant financial expenditure associated with Australia's firearms method restriction measures may not have had any impact on youth suicide. In 2008 McPhedran compared the incidence of mass shootings in Australia and New Zealand. The authors' conclude that "if civilian access to certain types of firearms explained the occurrence of mass shootings in Australia then New Zealand would have continued to experience mass shooting events".

In 2006, Weatherburn noted the importance of actively policing illegal firearm trafficking and argued that there was little evidence that the new laws had helped in this regard.

A 2006 study coauthored by Simon Chapman concluded: "Australia's 1996 gun law reforms were followed by more than a decade free of fatal mass shootings, and accelerated declines in firearm deaths, particularly suicides. Total homicide rates followed the same pattern. Removing large numbers of rapid-firing firearms from civilians may be an effective way of reducing mass shootings, firearm homicides and firearm suicides."

In 2007, a meta-analysis published in the Australian Medical Association's The Medical Journal of Australia researched nationwide firearm suicides. It found that "measures to control the availability of firearms ... have resulted in a decline in total suicide rates" and recommended further reduction in the availability of lethal means.

A 2008 study on the effects of the firearm buybacks by Wang-Sheng Lee and Sandy Suardi of University of Melbourne and La Trobe University found "the NFA did not have any large effects on reducing firearm homicide or suicide rates."

In 2009, a study published in the Journal of Sociology examined the rate of firearm suicide in Queensland. They found that "gun suicides are continuing to decrease in Queensland" and that this is "most likely as a function of ongoing gun controls".

In 2009, another paper from the Australian Institute for Suicide Research and Prevention at Griffith University also studied suicide in Queensland only, concluding: "No significant difference was found in the rate pre/post the introduction of the NFA in Queensland; however, a significant difference was found for Australian data, the quality of which is noticeably less satisfactory."

A 2010 study by Christine Neill and Andrew Leigh found the 1997 gun buyback scheme reduced firearm suicides by 74% while having no effect on non-firearm suicides or substitution of method.

In 2011, many studies have followed, providing varying results stemming from different methodologies and areas of focus. David Hemenway and Mary Vriniotis of Harvard University, funded by the Joyce Foundation, summarised the research in 2011 and concluded: "it would have been difficult to imagine more compelling future evidence of a beneficial effect." They said that a complication in evaluating the effect of the NFA was that gun deaths were falling in the early 1990s. They added that everyone should be pleased with the "immediate, and continuing, reduction" in firearm suicide and firearm homicide following the NFA.

In a 2013 report from the Australian Institute of Criminology, Samantha Bricknell, Frederic Lemieux and Tim Prenzler compared mass shootings between America and Australia and found the "1996 NFA coincided within the cessation of mass shooting events" in Australia, and that there were reductions in America that were evident during the 1994–2004 US Federal Assault Weapons Ban.

A 2014 report stated that approximately "260,000 guns are on the Australian 'grey' or black markets", and discussed the potential problem of people using 3D printers to create guns. NSW and Victorian police obtained plans to create 3D printed guns and tested to see if they could fire, but the guns exploded during testing.

A 2015 journal article in the International Review of Law and Economics evaluated the effect of the National Firearms Agreement on overall crime, rather than just firearm deaths like other studies. Using the difference in differences identification approach, they found that after the NFA, "there were significant decreases in armed robbery and attempted murder relative to sexual assault".

In 2016, four researchers evaluated the National Firearms Agreement after 20 years in relation to mental health. They said that the "NFA exemplifies how firearms regulation can prevent firearm mortality and injuries."

In 2016, a study by Adam Lankford, associate professor of criminal justice, examined the links between public mass shootings and gun availability in various countries. He found that the restrictions in Australia were effective, concluding that "in the wake of these policies, Australia has yet to experience another public mass shooting."

A 2017 oral presentation published in Injury Prevention examined the effect of the NFA on overall firearm mortality. They found that the NFA decreased firearm deaths by 61% and concluded that "Australian firearm regulations indeed contributed to a decline in firearm mortality." After this study, these researchers were reported in the Journal of Experimental Criminology in connection with another study with Charles Branas at Columbia University which concluded; "Current evidence showing decreases in firearm mortality after the 1996 Australian national firearm law relies on an empirical model that may have limited ability to identify the true effects of the law."

A 2018 study found that the NFA had no significant additional impact on assault or suicide mortality attributable to firearms in Australia.

In January 2025, a report by the Australia Institute found that on average, firearm license holders in Australia own more than four guns, with some individuals possessing significantly higher numbers, including two in suburban Sydney who each own over 300 firearms. Surveys indicate that three in four Australians support limits on individual firearm ownership. A report on the issue recommends strengthening gun regulations nationwide, addressing emerging concerns such as 3D-printed firearms. Detailed firearm data and jurisdictional breakdowns are available in Gun Control in Australia.

== Influences on firearms policy ==
=== Federal government ===
Until 1996, the Australian federal government had little role in firearms law. Following the Port Arthur massacre, the Howard government (1996–2007), with strong media and public support, introduced uniform gun laws with the cooperation of all the states, brought about through threats to Commonwealth funding arrangements. Then Prime Minister John Howard frequently referred to the United States to explain his opposition to civilian firearms ownership and usage in Australia, stating that he did not want Australia to go "down the American path". In one interview on Sydney radio station 2GB, Howard said, "We will find any means we can to further restrict them because I hate guns... ordinary citizens should not have weapons. We do not want the American disease imported into Australia." In 1995 Howard, as opposition leader, had expressed a desire to introduce restrictive gun laws.

In his autobiography Lazarus Rising: A Personal and Political Autobiography, Howard expressed his support for the anti-gun cause and his desire to introduce restrictive gun laws long before he became prime minister. In a television interview shortly before the 10th anniversary of the Port Arthur massacre, he reaffirmed his stance, "I did not want Australia to go down the American path. There are some things about America I admire and there are some things I don't. And one of the things I don't admire about America is their... slavish love of guns. They're evil." During the same television interview, Howard also stated that he saw the outpouring of grief in the aftermath of the Port Arthur massacre as "an opportunity to grab the moment and think about a fundamental change to gun laws in this country".

The National Firearms Agreement has had continuing support from both Labor and Coalition governments.

In March 2018, Victorian Police were set to be armed with military-style semi-automatic rifles to combat terrorism and the increase in gun-related crime.

=== Political parties ===
The Shooters, Fishers and Farmers Party is a political party that started in New South Wales claims to be "the voice of hunters, shooters, fishers, rural and regional Australia and independent thinking Australians everywhere. Advocating for the politically incorrect, a voice of reason, science and conservation". Its founder, John Tingle, served as an elected member of the New South Wales Legislative Council from 1995 until he retired in late 2006. As of June 2019, the party holds two seats in the NSW Legislative Council and three seats in the Legislative Assembly. The party holds one seat in the Western Australian Legislative Council, having won the seat at the 2013 Western Australian state election. The party also holds one seat in the Victorian Legislative Council, having won the seat at the 2018 Victorian state election.

A number of minor political parties such as the Libertarian Party, Country Alliance and Katter's Australian Party (represented in the House of Representatives by Bob Katter, who is the father-in-law of Robert Nioa, the CEO of Australia's largest private firearm supplier NIOA) have platforms advocating lawful civilian ownership of firearms.

The One Nation Party in 1997–98 briefly gained national prominence and had strong support from shooters. In March 2019, One Nation was the subject of a two-part Al Jazeera documentary series alleging that the party was soliciting financial assistance from the National Rifle Association of America and Koch Industries in order to change Australian gun control laws. Al Jazeera used an undercover reporter posing as a gun rights advocate. In response, One Nation leader Pauline Hanson condemned the documentary as a Qatar hit piece and announced that she had filed a complaint with the Australian Security Intelligence Organisation. Similar sentiments were echoed by the One Nation officials, James Ashby and Steve Dickson, who were featured in the documentary. In response to the documentary, the Australian Electoral Commission said that none of the activities shown in the documentary violated section 326 of the Commonwealth Electoral Act 1918 since they occurred overseas.

=== Pro-gun organisations ===
Shooting clubs have existed in Australia since the mid-19th century. They are mainly concerned with protecting the viability of hunting, collecting and target shooting sports. Australian shooters regard their sport as under permanent threat from increasingly restrictive legislation. They argue that they have been made scapegoats by politicians, the media, and anti-gun activists for the acts of criminals who generally use illegal firearms. Their researchers have found scant evidence that increasing restrictions have improved public safety, despite the high costs and severe regulatory barriers imposed on shooters in Australia.

The largest organisation of firearms owners is the Sporting Shooters Association of Australia (SSAA) which was established in 1948, and as at 2015 had 175,000 members. SSAA state branches lobby on local issues, while SSAA National addresses federal legislation and international issues. SSAA National has non-government organisation (NGO) status at the United Nations and is a founding member of The World Forum on the Future of Sport Shooting Activities (WFSA), which also has NGO status. SSAA National has a number of people working in research and lobbying roles. In 2008, they appointed journalist and media manager Tim Bannister as federal parliamentary lobbyist. SSAA argues that there is no evidence that gun control restrictions in 1987, 1996 and 2002 had any impact on rates of firearm homicide, suicide and accidental death. Also, responding to Neill and Leigh, SSAA said that 93% of people replaced their seized firearms with at least one, to replace their surrendered firearms.

The Shooting Industry Foundation of Australia (SIFA) was established in 2014 as the "peak body in research, advocacy, education and safety for one of our country's oldest and most innovative industries" serving to "represent more effectively the social, cultural, economic and environmental impact of the many thousands of Australians who work in the industry and aligned industries like agriculture, tourism, conservation and ethical harvest". Its board members are directors from Australia's five largest firearm importers/suppliers — NIOA, Raytrade, Outdoor Sporting Agencies (OSA), Winchester Australia and Beretta Australia. During 2017 Queensland state election, SIFA contributed to a political campaign called "Flick 'em", aimed at diverting the votes of major parties and electing a hung government more in favour of relaxing the gun law. SIFA also contributed significantly in the "Not.Happy.Dan" campaign against incumbent Victorian state premier Daniel Andrews during the 2018 Victorian state election.

For handguns, one major organisation in Australia is Pistol Australia. There are several other national bodies, such as Field and Game Australia, the National Rifle Association of Australia, IPSC Australia Inc, the Australian Clay Target Association and Target Rifle Australia. These national bodies with their state counterparts concentrate on a range of sporting and political issues ranging from Olympic-type competition through to conservation activities.

=== Anti-gun organisations ===
The National Coalition for Gun Control (NCGC) had a high profile in the public debate up to and immediately after the Port Arthur massacre. Rebecca Peters, Roland Browne, Simon Chapman and Reverend Tim Costello appeared in media reports and authored articles in support of tighter gun control. In 1996, the NCGC received the Australian Human Rights and Equal Opportunity Commission's Community Human Rights award.

In 2003, Samantha Lee as chair of the NCGC was financed by a Churchill Fellowship to publish a paper arguing that current handgun legislation is too loose, that police officers who are shooters have a conflict of interest, and that licensed private firearm ownership per se presents a threat to women and children.

In a late 2005 press release, Roland Browne as co-chair of the NCGC, advocated further restrictions on handguns.

On 26 August 2013, NCGC was incorporated into Gun Control Australia (GCA) in New South Wales as an association advocating for stronger gun laws, run by volunteer lawyers, public health academics and social media experts. The organisation is funded by community donations and is not affiliated with any political party. Its chair is Samantha Lee and its vice president is Roland Browne. Both Samantha Lee and Roland Browne are lawyers who have volunteered in the area of gun control for over ten years.

=== Public opinion ===
In 2015, Essential Research performed a poll regarding the support for Australia's gun laws. The demographic-normalised poll found that 6% of Australians thought the laws were "too strong", 40% thought "about right" and 45% thought "not strong enough". Essential Research repeated the poll a year later and found the responses had not changed. It also found these views were consistent regardless of political party voting tendency for Labor, Coalition or Greens voters.
