= Gun Control Australia =

Australian association

Gun Control Australia (GCA) is an Australian incorporated anti-gun association that advocates for tighter gun laws. Its website is run by volunteer lawyers, public health academics and social media activists. The organisation is funded by community donations and is not officially affiliated with any political party.

The organisation was originally known as the National Coalition for Gun Control, established by Rebecca Peters. The current GCA was incorporated in New South Wales on 26 August 2013. Its Chair is Samantha Lee and Vice President is Roland Browne, both are lawyers who have volunteered in the area of gun control for over ten years.

== History ==
There was a Gun Control Australia (GCA) based in Victoria that was formed by an activist named John Crook, who from the late 1970s wrote articles and made presentations challenging the basis of private firearms ownership. In 1981, Mr Crook used the public concern from the killing of two girls in separate crimes in 1981, and with the support of the victims' parents formed "The Council to Control Gun Misuse". The group was strengthened in 1987 after the spree killings in Hoddle Street and Queen Street in Melbourne.

In 1988 after the Hoddle and Queen Street shootings, a local group was formed under the aegis of Jac Renzenbrink to see what could be done. This group was augmented by John Crook, who had been active in gun control ever since the Bacsa shooting, Jim Williams, a former shooter, and Carolyn Worth, a women's rights activist. Later on Roland Brown and Lee Rhiannon became involved. One result of these meetings was the publication of Gun Control Review (ISSN 1032-674x) in Ballarat by Jim Williams and Peter Baird. It ran to three issues and its recommendations foreshadowed the legislation implemented under John Howard. A trifold pamphlet entitled Gun Control: some questions and answers was also produced.

Currently Gun Control Australia receives public donations.

== Activities ==
Samantha Lee has written various opinion pieces for The Sydney Morning Herald and The Guardian.

John Crook, has written or edited many articles and booklets, self-published under the banner of Gun Control Australia, the last in 2003. GCA maintains a website and occasionally features in media reports on gun law issues.

At its height in the mid-1990s, its spokespersons were very prominent in media discussions and conferences on gun violence. A short-lived website claimed major public health and other associations as its members, but was removed about 1998.

In 1996, Rebecca Peters, the then Chair of NCGC, received the Australian Human Rights and Equal Opportunity Commission's Community Human Rights award.

== Membership ==
Prominent former members, who are no longer involved with NCGC or GCA, include Simon Chapman, who has published research on the effects of gun control laws, Rebecca Peters, who went on to work for IANSA, an international gun control NGO, and former co-chair and spokesperson Tim Costello.

== Litigation history ==
GCA has attacked the Sporting Shooters Association of Australia (SSAA), a federated group of shooting sport clubs with over 180,000 members at 2015, as "extremist" and "pro-violence". In 1995, GCA were taken to court by the SSAA for this comment. GCA's lawyers successfully defended the case on the then-new basis that they were engaging in constitutionally-protected free speech.

== See also ==
- Gun laws in Australia
