= Rebecca Peters =

Political gun control advocate

Rebecca Peters AO
- Known for: Gun control in Australia
- Title: Director of the International Action Network on Small Arms
- Term: 2002–2010
- Board member of: Australian National Coalition for Gun Control (former Chair)

Rebecca Peters AO is a political advocate for gun control who served as Director of the International Action Network on Small Arms (IANSA) from 2002 to 2010. As of April 2012, Peters was listed on the IANSA board of directors.

== Background ==
Rebecca Peters studied law.

As chair of the Australian National Coalition for Gun Control at the time of the Port Arthur massacre in 1996, Peters contributed to the introduction of stricter gun control in Australia, working on the homogenization of gun laws across Australia's 6 states and 2 territories, the ban on semiautomatic rifles and shotguns, and a year-long buyback that destroyed nearly 700,000 weapons. In a televised debate with Ian McNiven, vice-president of the Firearms Owners Association, the latter declared that guns were necessary for men to defend women against the invasion of Indonesians in Australia, to which she replied that domestic violence was probably a much bigger issue. Thinking his microphone was off, he muttered back «I tell you what, if I was married to Rebecca Peters I'd probably commit domestic violence too», thus exemplifying the gender issue in the gun politics arena.

She worked for the Open Society Institute, a private foundation funded by George Soros. From 2002 to 2010, Rebecca Peters served as Director of the International Action Network on Small Arms (IANSA).

In 2014, she moved to Guatemala to lobby in favor of stricter gun control policies, and to fundraise for the Transitions Foundation of Guatemala, a foundation specialized in helping disabled victims of gun violence.

She has been criticised by the National Rifle Association of America which claims that Peters "is the voice and face of hatred of gun owners and Second Amendment freedoms."

== Recognitions ==
- 1996: Australian Human Rights Medal for her contribution to researching, educating and lobbying for gun law reforms in Australia.
- 2007: Officer of the Order of Australia for distinguished service to the community as an advocate and campaigner for gun control.

== See also ==
- Gun politics in Australia
- Gun politics in the United States
- Small arms proliferation issues
