= IPSC Australian Shotgun Championship =

The IPSC Australian Shotgun Championship is an IPSC level 3 championship held once a year by IPSC Australia.

== Champions ==
The following is a list of current and previous champions.

=== Overall category ===
Year	Division	Gold	Silver	Bronze	Venue
1987		(Australia)	(Australia)	(Australia)	
2009	Open	(Australia) Gareth Graham	(Australia) Darryl Tinning	(Australia) Benjamin Grehan	
2009	Standard Manual	(Australia) Bill Wood	(Australia) Luke Woodbridge	(Australia) Wayne Forden	
2010	Standard Manual	(Australia) Joe Dicenso	(Australia) Craig Pitts	(Australia) Richard Young	
2011	Standard Manual	(Australia) Greg Moon	(Australia) Matthew Lee	(Australia) Lex Carroll	
2013	Standard Manual	(Australia) Kyong Nahm	(Australia) Bill Wood	(Australia) Robert Josipovic	

=== Senior category ===
Year	Division	Gold	Silver	Bronze	Venue
2010	Standard Manual	(Australia) Richard Young	(Australia) Greg Smith	(Australia) Greg Moon	
2013	Standard Manual	(Australia) Bill Wood	(Australia) Bernie Dwyer	(Australia) Greg Smith	

=== Super Senior category ===
Year	Division	Gold	Silver	Bronze	Venue
2009	Standard Manual	(Australia) Luke Woodbridge	(Australia) Des Lilley	(Australia) Peter Dawson	
2010	Standard Manual	(Australia) Luke Woodbridge	(Australia) Laurie Suomalainen	(Australia) Ken Dickson	
2011	Standard Manual	(Australia) Lex Carroll	(Australia) Ken Dickson	(Australia) John Connors	
2013	Standard Manual	(Australia) Ken Dickson	(Australia) Des Lilley	(Australia) Eddie Howes	

== See also ==
- IPSC Australian Handgun Championship
- IPSC Australian Rifle Championship
