= Australian Shooter =

Australian Shooter is the official publication for the Sporting Shooters Association of Australia (SSAA), specifically dealing with sport shooting and hunting in Australia. It is published monthly.

== History ==
Australian Shooter was the original name given to the SSAA's member newsletter in 1948. It later became the Australian Shooters' Journal and remained so until 1999 when new managing editor Tim Bannister was given approval by the SSAA National Board to change the name back to Australian Shooter.

A monthly magazine, Australian Shooter quickly became the main publication for recreational shooters, competitors and hunters in Australia.

In 2007, Australian Shooter became one of the first magazines of its circulation in Australia to be fully printed on 100 per cent recycled paper.

In 2008, it had an audited circulation of more than 100,000 readers. In 2016, readership was more than 180,000 each month.

== Contents ==
Australian Shooter contains columns, firearm and accessory reviews, historical, technical and how-to articles, member letters, competition results and news, merchandise and profiles on SSAA shooting clubs and members.

The magazine also regularly features interviews with and profiles on celebrity shooters and hunters, in recent years including:

- Olympic shooter Russell Mark
- Beaconsfield Mine collapse survivor Todd Russell
- cricketer Glenn McGrath
- singer Shannon Noll
- artist Adam Cullen
- boxer Kostya Tszyu
- country music singer Kasey Chambers
- country music singer and 2008 Australian of the Year Lee Kernaghan

The firearms industry advertises in the magazine.

== Past and present editors ==
- January 1971 to February 1973: Gordon Nelis
- March 1973 to July 1982: Heinz H Raz
- August 1982 to December 1982: Janice Vertue (Sub Editor)
- January 1983 to November 1990: Rod Marvell
- December 1990 to August 1991: John Horgan
- September 1991 to November 1993: John Downing
- December 1993 to May 1999: Keith Tidswell
- June 1999 to October 2013: Tim Bannister
- November 2013 to October 2017: Kaye Jenkins (Editor), Tim Bannister (Editor and Chief)
- November 2017 to November 2023: Jennifer Martens (Chief of Staff and Acting Editor mid 2024), Tim Bannister (Chief Editor)
- March 2018 to present: Thomas Cook (Associate Editor), Allan Blane (Managing Editor)
