= IPSC Australian Rifle Championship =

The IPSC Australian Rifle Championship is an IPSC level 3 championship held once a year by IPSC Australia.

== Champions ==
The following is a list of current and previous champions.

=== Overall category ===
Year	Division	Gold	Silver	Bronze	Venue
1987		(Australia)	(Australia)	(Australia)	
2009	Manual Open	(Australia) Des Lilley	(Australia) Lex Carroll	(Australia) Benjamin Grehan	
2010	Manual Open	(Australia) Joe Dicenso	(Australia) John Bellman	(Australia) Vin Shuey	
2011	Manual Open	(Australia) Gareth Graham	(Australia) Darryl Tinning	(Australia) Lex Carroll	
2012	Manual Open	(Australia) Gary Tueno	(Australia) Justin O'Donnell	(Australia) Brendan Von Gerhardt	
2012	Manual Standard	(Australia) Bill Wood	(Australia) Greg Moon	(Australia) Andrew Moss	
2013	Manual Open	(Australia) Robert Josipovic	(Australia) Nathaniel Bastian	(Australia) Rick Hendrickson	

=== Senior category ===
Year	Division	Gold	Silver	Bronze	Venue
2010	Manual Open	(Australia) John Bellman	(Australia) Richard Young	(Australia) Steve Brown	
2012	Manual Open	(Australia) Rick Hendrickson	(Australia) Michael Samson	(Australia) David Dailey	
2012	Manual Standard	(Australia) Greg Moon	(Australia) Andrew Moss	(Australia) Chris Ellis	

=== Super Senior category ===
Year	Division	Gold	Silver	Bronze	Venue
2009	Manual Open	(Australia) Des Lilley	(Australia) Lex Carroll	(Australia) John Connors	
2010	Manual Open	(Australia) Vin Shuey	(Australia) Laurie Suomalainen	(Australia) Des Lilley	
2011	Manual Open	(Australia) Lex Carroll	(Australia) John Connors	(Australia) Colin Bisson	
2012	Manual Open	(Australia) John Bellman	(Australia) Vin Shuey	(Australia) Lex Carroll	
2013	Manual Open	(Australia) Bruce Chambers	(Australia) John Bellman	(Australia) Ken Dickson	

== See also ==
- IPSC Australian Handgun Championship
- IPSC Australian Shotgun Championship
