= Australian & New Zealand Handgun =

Australian & New Zealand Handgun is a publication of the Sporting Shooters' Association of Australia, specifically dealing with the sport shooting, professional use, and historic study of handguns in Australia.

== History and profile ==
Created in 2003 in response to the then Federal Government's National Handgun Buyback Act 2003, it showcases legitimate handgun shooting for handgun sport shooting competitors and those who utilise handguns as a tool of trade, such as veterinarians, security guards, the police and military, as well as featuring articles on historic handguns.

The inaugural issue of Handgun was sent to each and every Lower and Upper House Parliamentarian in Australia.

Handgun appears as an annual magazine and features product reviews, historical articles, club/discipline competition information and profiles on some of the country's top shooters.
