= IPSC Australian Handgun Championship =

Shooting competition

The IPSC Australian Handgun Championship is an IPSC level 3 championship held once a year by IPSC Australia.

== Champions ==
The following is a list of current and previous champions.

=== Overall category ===
Year	Division	Gold	Silver	Bronze	Venue
2003	Open	(Australia) Brodie McIntosh	(Australia) David McConachie	(Australia) Errol Thomas	
2003	Standard	(Australia) Bob Wilhelm	(Australia) Mario Mori	(Australia) Darren Abbott	
2003	Production	(Australia) Tony Baldock	(Australia) Kevin Regent	(Australia) Marcus Bamford	
2004	Open	(Australia) Brodie McIntosh	(Australia) Gareth Graham	(Australia) Peter Chmielewski	
2004	Standard	(Australia) Bob Wilhelm	(Australia) Jonathan Loftes	(Australia) Bill Wood	
2004	Production	(Australia) Greg Moon	(Australia) Scott Barnes	(Australia) Mark Carman	
2005	Open	(Australia) Brodie McIntosh	(Australia) David McConachie	(Australia) David Soldini	
2005	Standard	(Australia) Paul Williams	(Australia) Bill Wood	(Australia) Jonathan Loftes	
2005	Production	(Australia) Craig Ginger	(Australia) Paul Grech	(Australia) Marcus Bamford	
2006	Open	(Australia) Brodie McIntosh	(Australia) Gareth Graham	(Australia) David Soldini	
2006	Standard	(Australia) Ivan Rehlicki	(Australia) Mario Mori	(Australia) Paul Williams	
2006	Production	(Australia) Vaughan Alexander	(Australia) Paul Grech	(Australia) Paul Langley	
2007	Open	(Australia) Brodie McIntosh	(Australia) Daivd McConachie	(Australia) David Soldini	
2007	Standard	(Australia) Mario Mori	(Australia) Gary Tueno	(Australia) Bob Wilhelm	
2007	Production	(Australia) Angus Hobdell	(Australia) Paul Hagiantoniou	(Australia) Joshua Kelly	
2008	Open	(Australia) Brodie McIntosh	(Australia) David McConachie	(Australia) Kalan Kotsolgo	
2008	Standard	(Australia) Steven Clough	(Australia) Mario Mori	(Australia) Jonathan Loftes	
2008	Production	(Australia) Gary Tueno	(Australia) Paul Hagiantoniou	(Australia) Gary White	
2009	Open	(Australia)	(Australia)	(Australia)	
2009	Standard	(Australia)	(Australia)	(Australia)	
2009	Production	(Australia)	(Australia)	(Australia)	
2010	Open	(Australia) Brodie McIntosh	(Australia) Kalan Kotsoglo	(Australia) David Soldini	
2010	Standard	(Australia) Steven Clough	(Australia) Mario Mori	(Australia) Matt Webber	
2010	Production	(Australia) Gary Tueno	(Australia) Vaughan Alexander	(Australia) Josh Kelly	
2011	Open	(Australia) Brodie McIntosh	(Australia) David Mc Conachie	(Australia) David Soldini	
2011	Standard	(Australia) Jonathan Loftes	(Australia) Steven Clough	(Australia) Mario Mori	
2011	Production	(Australia) Gary Tueno	(Australia) Shaun Paterson	(Australia) Jim Staader	
2012	Open	(Australia) Brodie McIntosh	(Australia) Kalan Kotsoglo	(Australia) Gareth Graham	
2012	Standard	(Australia) Steven Clough	(Australia) Jonathan Loftes	(Australia) Brian Blight	
2012	Production	(Australia) Paul Hagiantoniou	(Australia) Shaun Paterson	(Australia) Simon Hewett	
2012	Classic	(Australia) Bill Wood	(Australia) Justin O'Donnell	(Australia) Vaughan Stockwell	
2013	Open	(Australia)	(Australia)	(Australia)	
2013	Standard	(Australia)	(Australia)	(Australia)	
2013	Production	(Australia)	(Australia)	(Australia)	
2014	Open	(Australia) Nick Kapor	(Australia) Gareth Graham	(Australia) Rhys Arthur	
2014	Standard	(Australia) Steven Clough	(Australia) Christopher Savill	(Australia) Damian Boyce	
2014	Production	(Australia) Paul Hagiantoniou	(Australia) Adrian Peeters	(Australia) Mark Kissun	
2014	Classic	(Australia) Andrew Crawford	(Australia) Suzy Ballantyne	(Australia) Jason Anderson	
2015	Open	(Australia)	(Australia)	(Australia)	
2015	Standard	(Australia)	(Australia)	(Australia)	
2015	Production	(Australia)	(Australia)	(Australia)	
2015	Classic	(Australia)	(Australia)	(Australia)	
2016	Open	(Australia) David Mc Conachie	(Australia) Brodie McIntosh	(Australia) Nick Kapor	
2016	Standard	(Australia) Chris Savill	(Australia) Jonathan Loftes	(Australia) Steve Clough	
2016	Production	(Australia) Adrian Peeters	(Australia) Paul Hagiantoniou	(Australia) Paul Phegan	
2016	Classic	(Australia) Daniel McIvor	(Australia) Terence Sleeth	(Australia) Andrew Crawford	

=== Lady category ===
Year	Division	Gold	Silver	Bronze	Venue
1991	Open	(Australia) Suzy Ballantyne	(Australia)	(Australia)	
1994	Open	(Australia) Suzy Ballantyne	(Australia)	(Australia)	
1996	Open	(Australia) Suzy Ballantyne	(Australia)	(Australia)	
2002	Open	(Australia) Suzy Ballantyne	(Australia)	(Australia)	
2004	Open	(Australia) Suzy Ballantyne	(Australia)	(Australia)	
2005	Open	(Australia) Suzy Ballantyne	(Australia)	(Australia)	
2006	Open	(Australia) Suzy Ballantyne	(Australia)	(Australia)	
2011	Open	(Australia) Suzy Ballantyne	(Australia)	(Australia)	
2014	Classic	(Australia) Suzy Ballantyne	(Australia)	(Australia)	
2015	Classic	(Australia) Suzy Ballantyne	(Australia)	(Australia)	

=== Junior category ===
Year	Division	Gold	Silver	Bronze	Venue
2009	Open	(Australia)	(Australia)	(Australia)	

=== Senior category ===
Year	Division	Gold	Silver	Bronze	Venue
2009	Open	(Australia)	(Australia)	(Australia)	

=== Super Senior category ===
Year	Division	Gold	Silver	Bronze	Venue
2009	Open	(Australia)	(Australia)	(Australia)	

== See also ==
- IPSC Australian Rifle Championship
- IPSC Australian Shotgun Championship
