= IPSC Australia Inc =

Australian practical shooting association

- Regional Director: Gareth Graham
- Parent organization: International Practical Shooting Confederation
- Website: ipsc.org.au

IPSC Australia Inc is the Australian association for practical shooting under the International Practical Shooting Confederation. It consists of seven sections: Victoria and Tasmania, South Australia, New South Wales, Australian Capital Territory, Queensland, Northern Territory and Western Australia.

== See also ==
- IPSC Australian Handgun Championship
- IPSC Australian Rifle Championship
- IPSC Australian Shotgun Championship
