= Gun control =

Laws or policies that regulate firearms

Firearm guiding policy by country according to the University of Sydney (Note: As of April 2022, the only countries with permissive gun legislation are: Chad, the Republic of Congo, Honduras, Micronesia, Namibia, Nigeria, Pakistan, Senegal, Switzerland, Tanzania, the United States, Yemen, and Zambia.) (April 2022) Permissive jurisdiction Restrictive jurisdiction Not included

Gun control, or firearms regulation, is the set of laws or policies that regulate the manufacture, sale, transfer, possession, modification, or use of firearms and ammunition by civilians.

Most countries allow civilians to own firearms but have strict firearms laws intended to prevent misuse or violence.

As of 2026, very few countries have firearms laws considered to be "permissive", with the United States being the paradigmatic example among that minority.

In some countries, such as Australia or the United States, gun control measures may be implemented at the national, state, or local levels. Countries like the United States and Mexico have constitutionally protected rights to gun ownership.

== Terminology and context ==
Gun control refers to domestic and international attempts to regulate, and harmonize the regulation of, the private and industrial manufacture, trade, possession, use, and transport of a class of weapons typically identified as small arms. This class of arms commonly includes revolvers, self-loading pistols, rifles and carbines, assault rifles, and some categories of machine gun.

In the United States, the term "gun control" itself is considered politicized and polarized. Many gun control advocates prefer the use of terms like "gun-violence prevention", "gun safety", or "common-sense regulation" to describe their objectives. While gun-rights advocates refer to gun control as "disarmament" and "gun confiscation." Discussions on the topics of gun control and gun rights are more prevalent in the United States than other countries, although these topics are also debated in countries such as Canada.

== Regulation of civilian firearms ==
With few exceptions, (Note: Brunei Darussalam, Cambodia, and Taiwan (Republic of China) prohibit civilian ownership of firearms in almost all instances. Eritrea and Somalia also prohibit civilian possession of firearms as part of their implementation of the UN Programme of Action on Small Arms. In the Solomon Islands, civilian firearm ownership is restricted to members of the Regional Assistance Mission.) most countries in the world allow some form of civilian firearm ownership. A 2011 survey of 28 countries over five continents (Note: The survey, carried out by the Small Arms Survey included 28 countries (42 jurisdictions in total). The countries included in the sample were: Africa: Egypt, Kenya, South Africa, Uganda; Americas: Belize, Brazil, Canada, Colombia, Dominican Republic, United States, Venezuela; Asia: India, Israel, Japan, Kazakhstan, Singapore, Turkey, Yemen; Europe: Croatia, Estonia, Finland, Lithuania, Russian Federation, Switzerland, United Kingdom; Oceania: Australia, New Zealand, Papua New Guinea.; The study states that "while the sample is diverse and balanced, it may not be representative of the systems in place in countries outside the sample".) found that a major distinction between different national gun control regimes is whether civilian gun ownership is seen as a right or a privilege.

The study concluded that both the United States and Yemen were distinct from the other countries surveyed in that they viewed gun ownership as a basic right of citizenship, and therefore their gun control policies are more permissive. In the remaining countries sampled, civilian gun ownership is considered a privilege, and their corresponding gun control policies are more restrictive. For many countries that view gun ownership as a privilege, gun rights, such as those in the United States, may be seen as too permissive.

Some countries, like those in East and Southeast Asia, can be particularly strict. East Asian countries are usually more indifferent to gun control and the gun rights debate. Countries like Japan and China enact strict controls on gun ownership. Some countries in these regions impose more extreme punishments than typically imposed by most countries for the same crime; for example, illegal gun ownership in Indonesia can be punished with a maximum of 20 years in prison, life in prison, or the death penalty.

For almost all European countries, gun ownership pertains to hunting and sport, and requires licensure with backgrounds checks.

== International and regional gun control ==
At the international and regional level, diplomatic attention has tended to focus on the cross-border illegal trade in small arms as an area of particular concern, rather than the regulation of civilian-held firearms. During the mid-1990s, however, the United Nations Economic and Social Council (ECOSOC) adopted a series of resolutions relating to the civilian ownership of small arms. These resolutions called for the exchange of data on national systems of firearm regulation and for the initiation of an international study of the issue. In July 1997, ECOSOC issued a resolution that underlined the responsibility of UN member states to competently regulate civilian ownership of small arms and urged them to ensure that their regulatory frameworks encompassed the following aspects: firearm safety and storage; penalties for the unlawful possession and misuse of firearms; a licensing system to prevent undesirable persons from owning firearms; exemption from criminal liability to promote the surrender of illegal, unsafe or unwanted guns by citizens; and a record-keeping system to track civilian firearms.

In 1997, the United Nations (UN) published a study based on member state survey data titled the United Nations International Study on Firearm Regulation, which was updated in 1999. (Note: The impetus behind this study was twofold: firstly, there were concerns over the incidence of firearm-related crimes, accidents and suicides; secondly, there was the apprehension that existing regulatory instruments administering the ownership, storage and training in the use of firearms held by civilians might be inadequate.) This study was intended to initiate the establishment of a database on civilian firearm regulations which would be run by the Centre for International Crime Prevention, located in Vienna, Austria, which was to report on national systems of civilian firearm regulation every two years. These plans never reached fruition, and further UN-led efforts to establish international norms for the regulation of civilian-held firearms were stymied. Responding to pressure from the US government, (Note: The US government was opposed to a section of the draft proposal calling on countries 'to seriously consider the prohibition of unrestricted trade and private ownership of small arms and light weapons'.) any mention of the regulation of civilian ownership of small arms was removed from the draft proposals for the 2001 UN Programme of Action on Small Arms.

Although the issue is no longer part of the UN policy debate, there have been eight regional agreements since 1991, involving 110 countries, concerning aspects of civilian firearm possession. The Bamako Declaration (Note: The full title is 'The Bamako Declaration on an African Common Position on the Illicit Proliferation, Circulation and Trafficking of Small Arms and Light Weapons (2000)'.) was adopted in Bamako, Mali on 1 December 2000 by the representatives of the member states of the Organisation of African Unity (OAU). The provisions of this declaration recommend that the signatories establish the illegal possession of small arms and light weapons as a criminal offence under national law in their respective countries.

== Historical context ==
=== 16th century ===
Debates over gun control emerged in the early 16th century, particularly in response to the spread of the wheellock mechanism, which made guns smaller and easier to conceal than earlier matchlocks. In 1518, wheellock firearms were prohibited in Habsburg territories, and a similar ban followed in the Duchy of Ferrara in 1522. By the mid-16th century, similar bans had spread across much of the Italian peninsula, and some states briefly restricted the manufacture of small wheellocks.

Throughout the 16th century, many European cities enacted restrictions on carrying firearms in urban areas. Larger guns usually continued to be allowed in the countryside, especially for hunting. Rules on gun ownership gradually reverted to older patterns that limited the bearing of arms to the upper class and their servants.

The expansion of town militias during the 16th century increased routine civilian access to firearms. By mid-century, a view had developed in parts of Europe that carrying firearms for self-defense should be allowed. A Venetian official in the same period linked wider gun ownership in Brescia (a center of gun manufacturing) to a decline in homicides within the city. At the same time, an anonymous treatise from the 1570s questioned the practical value of firearms for self-defense.

=== 17th century ===
In 1638, citing the "many inconveniences that arise daily from the carrying of arms", Cardinal Francesco Barberini issued a public ban prohibiting the carrying of firearms within the Papal States. The ban forbade any person, regardless of rank, from carrying arquebuses or terzaroli (short firearms), whether in cities or in the countryside, unless specifically permitted. Penalties ranged from fines for carrying long guns in the countryside to five years' galley service in towns. Short firearms were punished more severely, including confiscation of property, and in certain cases, capital punishment. Later popes, including Innocent XIII and Benedict XIV, attempted to extend the enforcement of such edicts into baronial jurisdictions, though with limited success.

=== 2000s statistics ===
In more recent years, calls for gun control have grown as the number of school shootings has risen. High rates of gun mortality and injury are often cited as a primary impetus for gun control policies.

In 2007, a global supply of 875 million small arms was estimated to be in the hands of civilians, law enforcement agencies, and national armed forces. (Note: This figure excludes older, pre-automatic small arms from military and law enforcement stockpiles or 'craft-produced' civilian firearms.) Of these firearms, 650 million, or 75%, were estimated to be held by civilians. US civilians account for 270 million of this total. A further 200 million are controlled by national military forces. Law enforcement agencies may have some 26 million small arms. Non-state armed groups (Note: Composed of 'insurgents and militias, including dormant and state-related groups'.) have about 1.4 million firearms. (Note: However, as of 2009, active non-state armed groups, numbering about 285,000 combatants, control only about 350,000 small arms.) Finally, gang members hold between 2 and 10 million small arms. Together, the small arms arsenals of non-state armed groups and gangs have been estimated to account for, at most, 1.4% of the global total.

US gun sales have risen in the 21st century, peaking in 2020 during the COVID-19 pandemic. "NICS" is the FBI's National Instant Background Check System.

=== United States ===
The United States has more guns per citizen than any other Western country. In the US, gun rights activists argue that gun laws are too restrictive or should not be altered, and gun control activists argue that gun laws are too permissive. Both camps center their arguments upon the legal and traditional interpretations of the Second Amendment to the US Constitution. Gun control measures include the Federal Assault Weapons Ban of 1994 that prohibited manufacturing certain semi-automatic firearms that were defined as assault weapons for civilian use. The act expired ten years after its effective date in 2004. Attempted gun control measures included the Assault Weapons Ban of 2013 bill, which was not passed into law.

=== Canada ===
In Canada, the Canadian Criminal Code, enacted in 1892, required individuals to have a permit to carry a pistol unless the owner had cause to fear assault or injury. Handgun registration became law in 1934, and automatic firearms registration was added in 1951, then the Criminal Law Amendment Act. In 1977, Bill C-51 required firearms acquisition certificates (FACs) to purchase any firearm.

On 1 May 2020, after deadly shootings in Nova Scotia, Prime Minister Justin Trudeau's government banned 1,500 kinds of military-style semi-automatic rifles, including the popular AR-15 and its variants. The ban was enacted via an Order In Council.

On 21 October 2022, still under the 29th Canadian Ministry with Trudeau as prime minister, Bill C-21 came into effect, aiming to address gun violence and strengthen gun control. The legislation introduced a national freeze on the sale, purchase, or transfer of handguns by individuals within Canada. It also established new "red flag" and "yellow flag" laws (similar to American red flag laws, with risk-based gun removal), allowing courts and Chief Firearms Officers (CFOs) to issue emergency weapons prohibition orders and temporarily suspend licenses, respectively. Moreover, the bill increased maximum penalties for firearms-related offenses, including gun smuggling and gun trafficking, from 10 to 14 years imprisonment. Additionally, Bill C-21 prohibited mid-velocity "replica" airguns that closely resemble real firearms and discharge projectiles at a velocity between 366 and 500 feet per second.

=== Australia ===
In Australia, gun control laws were enacted in the state of Victoria in 1988; the Opinel shooting led to a significant change in gun ownership legislation, along with the Port Arthur massacre in 1996. The National Firearms Agreement (NFA) was formed 12 days after the killing. John Howard, the prime minister at the time, said in proposing it: "We need to achieve a total prohibition on the ownership, possession, sale and importation of all automatic and semi-automatic weapons. That will be the essence of the proposal... ". The National Firearms Agreement was agreed upon on 10 May 1996.

== Studies for legislature effectiveness ==
Multiple studies show that where people have easy access to firearms, gun-related deaths tend to be more frequent, including by suicide, homicide, and unintentional injuries.

A 1998 review found that suicide rates generally declined after gun control laws were enacted, and concluded, "The findings support gun control measures as a strategy for reducing suicide rates." A 2016 review found that laws banning people under restraining orders due to domestic violence convictions from accessing guns were associated with "reductions in intimate partner homicide". Another 2016 review identified 130 studies regarding restrictive gun laws and found that the implementation of multiple such laws simultaneously was associated with a decrease in gun-related deaths. According to Vox, "The authors are careful to note that their findings do not conclusively prove that gun restrictions reduce gun deaths. However, they did find a compelling trend whereby new restrictions on gun purchasing and ownership tended to be followed by a decline in gun deaths."

In 2011, a UN study found, despite identifying a number of methodological problems, that: "Notwithstanding such challenges, a significant body of literature tends to suggest that firearm availability predominantly represents a risk factor rather than a protective factor for homicide. In particular, a number of quantitative studies tend towards demonstrating a firearm prevalence-homicide association."

=== United States ===
A National Research Council critical review in 2004 found that, while some strong conclusions are warranted from current research, the state of knowledge is generally poor. The scarcity of relevant data has made gun control one of the most contentious topics in American politics, and scholars remain deadlocked on a variety of issues. Notably, since 1996, when the Dickey Amendment was first inserted into the federal spending bill, the Centers for Disease Control and Prevention (CDC) has been prohibited from using its federal funding "to advocate or promote gun control", thwarting gun violence research at the agency at the time. The funding provision's author has said that this was an over-interpretation, but the amendment still had the outcome of effectively halting federally funded firearm-related research. Since the amendment, the CDC has continued to research gun violence and publish studies about it, although their funding for such research has fallen by 96% since 1996, according to Mayors Against Illegal Guns. According to a spokesman, the CDC has limited funding and has not produced any comprehensive study aimed at reducing gun violence since 2001.

In 2007, the global supply of 875 million small arms was estimated to be in the hands of civilians, law enforcement agencies, and national armed forces, of which 650 million, or 75%, were estimated to be held by civilians. US civilians accounted for 270 million of this total. Later research in 2017 showed the United States had 393 million privately-owned firearms at a per-capita rate of 120.5 per 100 residents.

Annual gun production in the US has increased substantially in the 21st century, after having remained fairly level over preceding decades. By 2023, a majority of US states allowed adults to carry concealed guns in public.

==== Cross-sectional studies ====
In 1983, a cross-sectional study of all 50 US states found that the six states with the most restrictive gun laws (according to the National Rifle Association of America) had suicide rates that were lower than other states by approximately 3 in 100,000 people, and compared to states with the most permissive gun laws the rates were lower by 4 in 100,000 people.

A 2003 study published in the American Journal of Preventive Medicine looked at the restrictiveness of gun laws and suicide rates in men and women in all 50 US states and found that states with more restrictive gun laws had lower suicide rates among both sexes. In 2004, from the National Research Council, commissioned by the National Academy of sciences, it was concluded that the effect of state-level gun laws on gun-related homicides was "limited" and had no measurable effect on violent crime.

A 2005 study looked at all 50 states in the US and the District of Columbia, and found that no gun laws had a particular association with reductions in firearm homicide or suicide, but that a "shall-issue" (mandatory issue of a license when legal criteria met) concealed carry law may be associated with increased firearm homicide rates.

A 2011 study found that firearm regulation laws in the US have "a significant deterrent effect on male suicide".

A 2013 study by the American Medical Association found that, "a higher number of firearm laws in a state are associated with a lower rate of firearm fatalities in that state." Other studies comparing gun control laws in different US states include a 2014 study, which found that states requiring licensing and inspections of gun dealers tended to have lower rates of gun homicides. Another study published the same year, analyzing panel data from all 50 states, found that stricter gun laws may modestly reduce gun deaths. A study in 2015 also found that "stricter state firearm legislation is associated with lower discharge rates" for nonfatal gun injuries.

A 2016 study published in The Lancet found that, of 25 laws studied and in the time period examined (2008–2010), nine were associated with reduced firearm mortality (including both homicide and suicide), nine were associated with increased mortality, and seven had an inconclusive association. The three laws most strongly associated with reduced firearm mortality were laws requiring universal background checks, background checks for ammunition sales, and identification for guns. In an accompanying commentary, economist David Hemenway noted that this study had multiple limitations, such as not controlling for all factors that may influence gun-related deaths aside from gun control laws and the use of 29 explanatory variables in the analysis.

A study from Quinnipiac University economist Mark Guis, using a 30-year period, found a positive correlation between certain restrictions and violent crime. For example, the correlation indicated that violent crime was 19.3% higher on a state level when the federal "assault weapons" ban was in effect. It also found that states with stricter concealed carry laws had a 10% higher gun-related murder rate. Another study, published the same year, found that states with permit to purchase, registration, and/or license laws for handguns had lower overall suicide rates, as well as lower firearm suicide rates.

A 2014 study found that children living in states with stricter gun laws were safer. Similarly, a study in 2016 found that US states with lenient gun control laws had more gun-related child injury hospital admissions than states with stricter gun control laws.

A study looking specifically at suicide rates in the US found that the four handgun laws examined (waiting periods, universal background checks, gun locks, and open carrying regulations) were associated with "significantly lower firearm suicide rates and the proportion of suicides resulting from firearms". The study also found that all four of these laws (except the waiting-period law) were associated with reductions in the overall suicide rate.

A 2016 study found that US military veterans tend to commit suicide with guns more often than the general population, thereby possibly increasing state suicide rates, and that "the tendency for veterans to live in states without handgun legislation may exacerbate this phenomenon". Another study in 2016 found that stricter state gun laws in the United States reduced suicide rates.

California has exceptionally strict gun sales laws, and a 2015 study found that it also had the oldest guns recovered in crimes of any states in the US. The same study stated, "These findings suggest that more restrictive gun sales laws and gun dealer regulations do make it more difficult for criminals to acquire new guns first purchased at retail outlets." A study in 2017 showed that laws banning gun possession by people subject to intimate partner violence restraining orders, as well as requiring such people to give up any guns they have, were associated with lower intimate partner homicide rates.

===== Waiting period laws =====
A 2017 study found that suicide rates declined more in states with universal background check and mandatory waiting period laws than in states without these laws. Another 2017 study found that states without universal background check and/or waiting period laws had steeper increases in their suicide rates than did states with these laws. A third 2017 study found that "waiting period laws that delay the purchase of firearms by a few days reduce gun homicides by roughly 17%".

A 2017 study in the Economic Journal found that mandatory handgun purchase delays reduced "firearm-related suicides by between 2 and 5 percent with no statistically significant increase in non-firearm suicides", and were "not associated with statistically significant changes in homicide rates".

A study in 2021 found that firearm purchase delay laws reduced homicide; the authors suggested that it was driven by reductions in gun purchases by impulsive customers.

==== Findings of systematic reviews ====
In 2015, Daniel Webster and Garen Wintemute reviewed studies examining the effectiveness of gun laws aimed at keeping guns out of the hands of high-risk individuals in the United States. They found that some laws prohibiting gun possession by people under domestic violence restraining orders or who had been convicted of violent misdemeanors were associated with lower violence rates, as were laws establishing more procedures to check if people were prohibited from owning a gun under these laws. They also found that multiple other gun regulations intended to prevent prohibited individuals from obtaining guns, such as "rigorous permit-to-purchase" laws and "comprehensive background checks", were "negatively associated with the diversion of guns to criminals".

A 2016 systematic review found that restrictive gun licensing laws were associated with lower gun injury rates, while concealed carry laws were not significantly associated with rates of such injuries. Another systematic review found that stricter gun laws were associated with lower gun homicide rates; this association was especially strong for background check and permit-to-purchase laws.

A New York Times study reported how outcomes of active shooter attacks varied with actions of the attacker, the police (42% of total incidents), and bystanders (including a "good guy with a gun" outcome in 5.1% of total incidents).

A 2024 review by RAND Corporation of thousands of studies published between 2004 and 2023 found only 207 that met their criteria of methodological rigor, suggesting that "rigorous scientific evidence concerning the effects of many commonly discussed gun policies remains limited". Additionally, only 4 of the 18 gun policies they examined had strong supportive evidence. The policies with the strongest supporting evidence were: child access prevention laws reduce firearm assault and self-injuries, homicides, and deaths among young people; "stand-your-ground" laws increase firearm homicides; raising the minimum age requirement for the purchase of firearms reduces firearm suicide deaths among young people; and "shall-issue" concealed carry laws increase total homicides, firearm homicides, and violent crime. RAND also noted that the limitations of currently available evidence "does not mean that these policies are ineffective ... Instead, it partly reflects shortcomings in the contributions that science has made to policy debates."

==== Studies of individual laws ====
Other studies have examined trends in firearm-related deaths before and after gun control laws are either enacted or repealed. A 2004 study in the Journal of the American Medical Association found evidence that child access prevention laws were "associated with a modest reduction in suicide rates among youth aged 14 to 17 years".

Two 2015 studies found that the permit-to-purchase law passed in Connecticut in 1995 was associated with a reduction in firearm suicides and homicides. One of these studies also found that the repeal of Missouri's permit-to-purchase law was associated with "a 16.1% increase in firearm suicide rates", and a 2014 study by the same research team found that the repeal of this law was associated with a 16% increase in homicide rates.

A 2000 study designed to assess the effectiveness of the Brady Handgun Violence Prevention Act found that the law was not associated with reductions in overall homicide or suicide rates, but that it was associated with a reduction in the firearm suicide rate among individuals aged 55 or older.

A 1991 study looked at Washington, D.C.'s Firearms Control Regulations Act of 1975, which banned its residents from owning all guns except certain shotguns and sporting rifles, which were also required to be stored unloaded, disassembled, or with a trigger lock in their owners' homes. The study found that the law's enactment was associated with "a prompt decline in homicides and suicides by firearms in the District of Columbia". A 1996 study reanalyzed this data and reached a significantly different conclusion as to the effectiveness of this law.

==== Other studies and debate ====
In 1993, Kleck and Patterson analyzed the impact of 18 major types of gun control laws on every major type of gun-involved crime or violence (including suicide) in 170 US cities, and found that gun laws generally had no significant effect on violent crime rates or suicide rates. Similarly, a 1997 study found that gun control laws had only a small influence on the rate of gun deaths in US states compared to socioeconomic variables like poverty and unemployment.

Philosophy professor Michael Huemer argued that gun control may be morally wrong, even if its outcomes would be positive, because individuals have a prima facie right to own a gun for self-defense and recreation.

A 2007 article published by the Journal of Injury Prevention states that approximately 60% of firearms used to commit violent crime can be traced to 1% of licensed dealers. This finding indicates that, although gun laws effectively regulate approximately 99% of purchases made from licensed dealers, a majority of gun-related violent crimes are perpetrated using guns that were purchased in violation of regulations. The Journal of Injury Prevention article advocates for increased monitoring of gun vendors in tandem with the optimization of gun sale regulation as a means to decrease violent crime perpetrated with a firearm.

In 2009, the Public Health Law Research program, an independent organization, published several evidence briefs summarizing the research that assesses the effects of a specific law or policy on public health, particularly as concerns the effectiveness of various laws related to gun safety. Among their findings:

- There is not enough evidence to establish the effectiveness of "shall-issue" laws, as distinct from "may-issue" laws, as a public health intervention to reduce violent crime.
- There is insufficient evidence to determine the effectiveness of waiting period laws as public health interventions aimed at preventing gun-related violence and suicide.
- Although child access prevention laws may represent a promising intervention for reducing gun-related morbidity and mortality among children, there is currently insufficient evidence to validate their effectiveness as a public health intervention aimed at reducing gun-related harms.
- There is insufficient evidence to establish the effectiveness of such bans as public health interventions aimed at reducing gun-related harms.
- There is insufficient evidence to validate the effectiveness of firearm licensing and registration requirements as legal interventions aimed to reduce firearm related harms.

The RAND Corporation conducted a study that demonstrates that background checks may decrease suicides and violent crime; child-access prevention laws may decrease the number of suicides and unintentional injuries and deaths; minimum age requirements may decrease suicides; and prohibitions associated with mental illness may decrease suicides and violent crimes. Additionally, concealed carry laws may increase violent crimes and suicides, while "stand your ground" laws may increase violent crime. Waiting periods and background checks were found to have a moderate effect on lowering violent crime; meanwhile, assault weapons bans, gun registration, and magazine bans were found to have an inconclusive effect on violent crime.

An August 2019 article in Business Insider entitled "Gun control really works" looked at a dozen studies by the CDC, The Journal of the American Medical Association, Rand Corporation, the journal Preventive Medicine, Everytown for Gun Safety, Johns Hopkins University, and others. They concluded that mirroring the firearms regulations in Switzerland such as banning the sale of new assault weapons, denying concealed carry licenses to some individuals, and prohibiting firearm sales to people convicted of multiple alcohol-related offenses will decrease gun-related deaths and injuries.

=== Canada ===
With respect to the Criminal Law Amendment Act, a gun control law passed in Canada in 1977. Some studies have found that it was ineffective at reducing homicide or robbery rates, with one study finding that the law may have actually increased robberies involving firearms.

A 1993 study found that, after the 1977 law was passed, gun suicides decreased significantly, as did the proportion of suicides committed in the country with guns. A 2003 study found that the law "may have had an impact on suicide rates, even after controls for social variables," while a 2001 study by the same research team concluded that the law "may have had an impact on homicide rates, at least for older victims."

A 1994 study found that, after this law came into force in 1978, suicide rates decreased over time in the province of Ontario, and that there was no evidence of method substitution. The same study found that, "These decreases may be only partly due to the legislation."

In 1991, Canada implemented the gun control law Bill C-17. According to a 2004 study, after this law was passed, firearm-related suicides and homicides, as well as the percentage of suicides involving firearms, declined significantly. A 2010 study found that after this law was passed, firearm suicides declined in the province of Quebec among men, but acknowledged that this may not represent a causal relationship. In 1992, Canada promulgated the Canadian Firearms Act, which aimed at ensuring that guns were stored safely.

A 2004 study found that, while firearm suicide rates declined in the Quebec region of Abitibi-Témiscamingue after the law was passed, overall suicide rates did not. A study in 2005 also found that overall suicide rates did not change after passage of Bill C-17.

A 2008 study reached similar conclusions with regard to the entire Quebec province: finding that Bill C-17 did not seem to increase the rate at which the firearm suicide rate was already declining. However, other researchers have criticized this 2008 study for looking at too short a time period and not taking account of the fact that the regulations in C-17 were implemented gradually.

A 1990 study compared suicide rates in the Vancouver, British Columbia, Canada metropolitan area (where gun control laws were more restrictive) with those in the nearby city of Seattle, Washington in the US. The overall suicide rate was essentially the same in the two locations, but the suicide rate among 15 to 24 year olds was about 40 percent higher in Seattle than in Vancouver. The authors concluded that "restricting access to handguns might be expected to reduce the suicide rate in persons 15 to 24 years old, but ... it probably would not reduce the overall suicide rate." A study that looked at provincial gun ownership rates and associated suicide rates found no significant correlations with overall suicide rates.

A 2011 study looked at gun control passed in Canada between 1974 and 2004 and found that gun laws were responsible for 5 to 10 percent drops in firearm homicides. The study found that the homicide reduction effects of Canadian gun legislation remained even after accounting for sociodemographic and economic factors associated with homicide rates.

A 2012 study looked at gun control laws passed in Canada from 1974 to 2008 and found no evidence that these laws had a beneficial effect on reducing firearm homicide rates. According to the study, "other factors found to be associated with homicide rates were median age, unemployment, immigration rates, percentage of population in low-income bracket, Gini index of income equality, population per police officer, and incarceration rate."

A 2013 study of the 1995 Canadian gun control law Firearms Act reported little evidence that this law significantly reduced rates of lethal gun violence against women.

A 2020 study examining laws passed from 1981 to 2016 found no significant changes in overall homicide or suicide rates following changes in legislation. In addition, it also found that firearm ownership by province was not correlated to overall suicide rates by province.

=== Australia ===
In 1988 and 1996, gun control laws were enacted in the Australian state of Victoria, both times following mass shootings. A 2004 study found that in the context of these laws, overall firearm-related deaths, especially suicides, declined dramatically. A 1995 study found preliminary evidence that gun control legislation enacted in Queensland, Australia, reduced suicide rates there.

A 2006 study by gun lobby-affiliated researchers Jeanine Baker and Samara McPhedran found that, after Australia enacted the gun control law, National Firearms Agreement (NFA), in 1996, gun-related suicides may have been affected, but no other parameter appeared to have been.

Another 2006 study, led by Simon Chapman, found that, after this law was enacted in 1996, Australia spent more than a decade without any mass shootings, and gun-related deaths (especially suicides) declined dramatically. The study, which looked at firearm deaths before and after the implementation of the 1996 gun control reforms and the effects of control on mass shootings, homicides, and suicides, found: "an accelerated decline in firearm deaths, particularly suicides" and that, removing "rapid firing firearms may be an effective way of reducing mass shootings, firearm homicides and firearm suicides." The researchers of Chapman's study also criticized the Baker and McPhedran study for using a time-series analysis despite the fact that, according to Chapman et al., "calculating mortality rates and then treating them as a number in a time series ignores the natural variability inherent in the counts that make up the numerator of the rate." Chapman et al. also said that Baker and McPhedran used the Box–Jenkins model inappropriately.

A study in 2010 also looked at the effects of the NFA on gun-related deaths, finding that the law "did not have any large effects on reducing firearm homicide or suicide rates," although David Hemenway has criticized this study for using a structural break test despite the fact that such tests can miss the effects of policies in the presence of lags, or when the effect occurs over several years. Another study, published the same year, found that Australia's gun buyback program reduced gun-related suicide rates by almost 80%, while non-gun death rates were not significantly affected.

Other research has argued that, although gun suicide rates fell after the NFA was enacted, the NFA may not have been responsible for this decrease and "a change in social and cultural attitudes" may have instead been at least partly responsible.

A 2011 study found that "Australia's prohibition of certain types of firearms" has not prevented mass shootings. In 2016, Chapman co-authored another study, which found that there were no mass shootings in the country after the NFA was passed (as of May 2016), and that gun-related death rates declined more quickly after the NFA than they did before it. However, the study also found that non-gun suicide and homicide rates declined even more quickly after the NFA, leading the authors to conclude that "it is not possible to determine whether the change in firearm deaths can be attributed to the gun law reforms."

=== Other countries ===
Possession of long guns by country:
No permit required for both repeating and semi-automatic long guns
Partially licensed – repeating long guns permitless, semi-automatic with permit
Allowed with permit – no good reason required or simple declaration of reason^{1}
Allowed with permit – good reason (like sport shooting license or proving danger to life) required^{1}
Prohibited with exceptions or prohibited in practice – few licenses are issued
Prohibited – civilians are banned from obtaining long guns
Different rules regarding shotguns and rifles
^{1}Some countries in these categories may place additional restrictions or ban semi-automatic long guns

Possession of handguns by country:
No permit required – permits or licenses are not required to obtain handguns
Allowed with permit – no good reason required or simple declaration of reason
Allowed with permit – good reason (like sport shooting license or proving danger to life) required
Prohibited with exceptions or prohibited in practice – few licenses are issued
Prohibited – civilians are banned from obtaining handguns

Notes:

- Map describes policy regarding obtaining new firearms regardless whether firearms that were produced before ban were grandfathered.

A 2007 study found evidence that gun control laws passed in Austria in 1997 reduced the rates of firearm suicide and homicide in that country.

In Brazil, after disarmament laws were passed in 2003, gun-related mortality declined by 8% in 2004 relative to the previous year: the first decline observed in a decade. Gun-related hospitalizations also reversed their previous trend by decreasing 4.6% from 2003 to 2004.

A 2006 study found that, after gun control laws were passed in New Zealand in 1992, suicides committed with guns declined significantly, especially among youth. However, this study also found that overall suicide rates did not change significantly. A case–control study conducted in New Zealand found that gun ownership was significantly associated with a greater risk of gun suicides, but not suicides overall.

A 2010 study looked at the effect of a policy adopted by the Israel Defense Forces, which restricted access to guns among adolescents, on suicide rates and found that, "Following the policy change, suicide rates decreased significantly by 40%." The authors concluded that, "The results of this study illustrate the ability of a relatively simple change in policy to have a major impact on suicide rates."

A 2013 study showed that, after the Military of Switzerland adopted the Army XXI reform which restricted gun availability, in 2003, suicide rates – both overall and firearm-related – decreased.

Also in 2013, a study looking at four restrictive gun laws passed in Norway found that two of them may have reduced firearm mortality among men, but that the evidence was less conclusive with respect to all of the laws they studied.

A 2014 study found that, after South Africa's Firearm Control Act was passed in 2000, homicide rates in the country declined and concluded that, "stricter gun control mediated by the FCA accounted for a significant decrease in homicide overall, and firearm homicide in particular, during the study period [2001–2005]."

A study in 2000 found that a ban on carrying guns in Colombia was associated with reductions in homicide rates in two cities in the country, namely, Cali and Bogotá.

== See also ==
- Concealed carry
- Gun violence
- List of most-produced firearms
- Right to keep and bear arms

=== International ===
- Game law
- Hunting license
- List of countries by gun ownership
- Overview of gun laws by nation
- Firearms Act

=== United States ===
- Assault weapons legislation in the United States
- Federal Assault Weapons Ban
- Gun Control Act of 1968
- Gun control after the Sandy Hook Elementary School shooting
- Gun politics in the United States
- Gun show loophole
- Public opinion on gun control in the United States
- 2018 United States gun violence protests

== Bibliography ==
- Alley, Roderic (2004). Internal Conflict and the International Community: Wars Without End?. Aldershot: Ashgate. ISBN 978-0-7546-0976-6. Archived from the original on 2017-01-10.
- Anestis, MD; Anestis, JC (October 2015). "Suicide Rates and State Laws Regulating Access and Exposure to Handguns". American Journal of Public Health. 105 (10): 2049–58. doi:10.2105/ajph.2015.302753. PMC 4566524. PMID 26270305.
- Anestis, MD; Khazem, LR; Law, KC; et al. (October 2015). "The Association Between State Laws Regulating Handgun Ownership and Statewide Suicide Rates". American Journal of Public Health. 105 (10): 2059–67. doi:10.2105/AJPH.2014.302465. PMC 4566551. PMID 25880944.
- Anestis, MD; Capron, DW (March 2016). "The associations between state veteran population rates, handgun legislation, and statewide suicide rates". Journal of Psychiatric Research. 74: 30–34. doi:10.1016/j.jpsychires.2015.12.014. PMID 26736038.
- Anestis, MD; Anestis, JC; Butterworth, SE (April 2017). "Handgun Legislation and Changes in Statewide Overall Suicide Rates". American Journal of Public Health. 107 (4): 579–581. doi:10.2105/AJPH.2016.303650. PMC 5343707. PMID 28207333.
- Anestis, MD; Selby, EA; Butterworth, SE (July 2017). "Rising longitudinal trajectories in suicide rates: The role of firearm suicide rates and firearm legislation". Preventive Medicine. 100: 159–66. doi:10.1016/j.ypmed.2017.04.032. PMID 28455222.
- Anonymous (1909). "Carrying Concealed Weapons". Virginia Law Register. 15 (5): 337–416. JSTOR 1102220.
- Baker, J.; McPhedran, S. (2006). "Gun Laws and Sudden Death: Did the Australian Firearms Legislation of 1996 Make a Difference?" (PDF). British Journal of Criminology. 47 (3): 455–69. doi:10.1093/bjc/azl084. Archived (PDF) from the original on 2015-07-14.
- Beautrais, A. L.; Joyce, P. R.; Mulder, R. T. (1996). "Access to firearms and the risk of suicide: A case control study". Australian and New Zealand Journal of Psychiatry. 30 (6): 741–48. doi:10.3109/00048679609065040. PMID 9034462. S2CID 9805679.
- Beautrais, A. L.; Fergusson, D. M.; Horwood, L. J. (January 2006). "Firearms legislation and reductions in firearm-related suicide deaths in New Zealand". Australian and New Zealand Journal of Psychiatry. 40 (3): 253–59. doi:10.1080/j.1440-1614.2006.01782.x. PMID 16476153. S2CID 208623661.
- Betz, Marian; Ranney, Megan; Wintemute, Garen (21 January 2016). "Frozen Funding on Firearm Research: "Doing Nothing Is No Longer an Acceptable Solution"". Western Journal of Emergency Medicine. 17 (1): 91–93. doi:10.5811/westjem.2016.1.29767. PMC 4729430. PMID 26823941.
- Blais, Étienne; Gagné, Marie-Pier; Linteau, Isabelle (2011). "L'Effet des lois en matière de contrôle des armes à feu sur les homicides au Canada, 1974–2004". Canadian Journal of Criminology and Criminal Justice. 53 (1): 27–61. doi:10.3138/cjccj.53.1.27. S2CID 143960174.
- Branas, C. C.; Richmond, T. S.; Culhane, D. P.; et al. (2009). "Investigating the Link Between Gun Possession and Gun Assault". American Journal of Public Health. 99 (11): 2034–40. doi:10.2105/AJPH.2008.143099. PMC 2759797. PMID 19762675.
- Bridges, F. Stephen (June 2004). "Gun Control Law (Bill C-17), Suicide, and Homicide in Canada". Psychological Reports. 94 (3): 819–26. doi:10.2466/pr0.94.3.819-826. PMID 15217033. S2CID 25666987.
- Britt, Chester L.; Kleck, Gary; Bordua, David J. (1996). "A Reassessment of the D.C. Gun Law: Some Cautionary Notes on the Use of Interrupted Time Series Designs for Policy Impact Assessment". Law & Society Review. 30 (2): 361–80. doi:10.2307/3053963. JSTOR 3053963.
- Bukstein, O. G.; Brent, O. A.; Perper, J. A.; et al. (1993). "Risk factors for completed suicide among adolescents with a lifetime history of substance abuse: A case-control study". Acta Psychiatrica Scandinavica. 88 (6): 403–08. doi:10.1111/j.1600-0447.1993.tb03481.x. PMID 8310846. S2CID 44711985.
- Bryant, M. S. (2012a). "Germany, Gun Laws". In Carter, G. L. (ed.). Guns in American society: an encyclopedia of history, politics, culture, and the law. Vol. 1. Santa Barbara, CA: ABC-CLIO. pp. 314–16. ISBN 978-0-313-38670-1. Archived from the original on 2022-05-31.
- Bryant, M. S. (2012b). "Holocaust Imagery and Gun Control". In Carter, G. L. (ed.). Guns in American society: an encyclopedia of history, politics, culture, and the law. Vol. 1. Santa Barbara, CA: ABC-CLIO. pp. 411–14. ISBN 978-0-313-38670-1. Archived from the original on 2014-07-01.
- Caron, Jean (October 2004). "Gun Control and Suicide: Possible Impact of Canadian Legislation to Ensure Safe Storage of Firearms". Archives of Suicide Research. 8 (4): 361–74. doi:10.1080/13811110490476752. PMID 16081402. S2CID 35131214.
- Caron, J; Julien, M; Huang, JH (April 2008). "Changes in suicide methods in Quebec between 1987 and 2000: the possible impact of bill C-17 requiring safe storage of firearms". Suicide and Life-Threatening Behavior. 38 (2): 195–208. doi:10.1521/suli.2008.38.2.195. PMID 18444777.
- Carrington, PJ; Moyer, S (April 1994). "Gun control and suicide in Ontario". The American Journal of Psychiatry. 151 (4): 606–08. doi:10.1176/ajp.151.4.606. PMID 8147463.
- Cantor, CH; Slater, PJ (5 June 1995). "The impact of firearm control legislation on suicide in Queensland: preliminary findings". The Medical Journal of Australia. 162 (11): 583–85. doi:10.5694/j.1326-5377.1995.tb138547.x. PMID 7791644. S2CID 43656446.
- Centers for Disease Control and Prevention (3 October 2003). "First Reports Evaluating the Effectiveness of Strategies for Preventing Violence: Early Childhood Home Visitation and Firearms Laws. Findings from the Task Force on Community Preventive Services" (PDF). Morbidity and Mortality Weekly Report. 52 (RR-14): 11–20. ISSN 1057-5987. Archived (PDF) from the original on 2017-07-08.
- Centers for Disease Control and Prevention (2 August 2013). "Firearm Homicides and Suicides in Major Metropolitan Areas – United States, 2006–2007 and 2009–2010". Morbidity and Mortality Weekly Report. 62 (30): 597–602. PMC 4604852. PMID 23903593. Archived from the original on 2017-04-22.
- Chapman, S.; Alpers, P.; Agho, K.; Jones, M. (2006). "Australia's 1996 gun law reforms: Faster falls in firearm deaths, firearm suicides, and a decade without mass shootings". Injury Prevention. 12 (6): 365–72. doi:10.1136/ip.2006.013714. PMC 2704353. PMID 17170183.
- Chapman, Simon; Alpers, Philip; Jones, Michael (22 June 2016). "Association Between Gun Law Reforms and Intentional Firearm Deaths in Australia, 1979–2013". JAMA. 316 (3): 291–99. doi:10.1001/jama.2016.8752. PMID 27332876.
- Cheung, A. H.; Dewa, C. S. (2005). "Current trends in youth suicide and firearms regulations". Canadian Journal of Public Health. 96 (2): 131–35. doi:10.1007/BF03403676. PMC 6975744. PMID 15850034.
- Conner, Kenneth R; Zhong, Yueying (November 2003). "State firearm laws and rates of suicide in men and women". American Journal of Preventive Medicine. 25 (4): 320–24. doi:10.1016/S0749-3797(03)00212-5. PMID 14580634.
- Conwell, Y.; Duberstein, P. R.; Connor, K.; et al. (2002). "Access to Firearms and Risk for Suicide in Middle-Aged and Older Adults". The American Journal of Geriatric Psychiatry. 10 (4): 407–16. doi:10.1097/00019442-200207000-00007. PMID 12095900.
- Crandall, M; Eastman, A; Violano, P; et al. (November 2016). "Prevention of firearm-related injuries with restrictive licensing and concealed carry laws: An Eastern Association for the Surgery of Trauma systematic review". The Journal of Trauma and Acute Care Surgery. 81 (5): 952–60. doi:10.1097/ta.0000000000001251. PMID 27602894. S2CID 22673439.
- Crifasi, CK; Meyers, JS; Vernick, JS; Webster, DW (October 2015). "Effects of changes in permit-to-purchase handgun laws in Connecticut and Missouri on suicide rates". Preventive Medicine. 79: 43–49. doi:10.1016/j.ypmed.2015.07.013. PMID 26212633.
- Dandurand, Yvon (September 1998). "4. Firearm Suicides". Firearms, Accidental Deaths, Suicides and Violent Crime (PDF) (working document). Department of Justice, Canada. Archived (PDF) from the original on 2021-06-15.
- Díez, C; Kurland, RP; Rothman, EF; et al. (17 October 2017). "State Intimate Partner Violence-Related Firearm Laws and Intimate Partner Homicide Rates in the United States, 1991 to 2015". Annals of Internal Medicine. 167 (8): 536–43. doi:10.7326/M16-2849. PMID 28975202.
- de Fatima Marinho de Souza, M.; Macinko, J.; Alencar, A. P.; et al. (March–April 2007). "Reductions In Firearm-Related Mortality And Hospitalizations In Brazil After Gun Control". Health Affairs. 26 (2): 575–84. doi:10.1377/hlthaff.26.2.575. PMID 17339689.
- Dyer, Gwynne (2010). War: The New Edition. Random House. ISBN 978-0-307-36901-7. Archived from the original on 2017-01-10.
- Edwards, Griffin; Nesson, Erik; Robinson, Josh; Vars, Fredrick (2018). "Looking Down the Barrel of a Loaded Gun: The Effect of Mandatory Handgun Purchase Delays on Homicide and Suicide". The Economic Journal. 128 (616): 3117–40. doi:10.1111/ecoj.12567. ISSN 1468-0297. S2CID 155851188.
- Fleegler, EW; Lee, LK; Monuteaux, MC; et al. (13 May 2013). "Firearm legislation and firearm-related fatalities in the United States". JAMA Internal Medicine. 173 (9): 732–40. doi:10.1001/jamainternmed.2013.1286. PMID 23467753.
- Gagne, M.; Robitaille, Y.; Hamel, D.; St-Laurent, D. (29 June 2010). "Firearms regulation and declining rates of male suicide in Quebec". Injury Prevention. 16 (4): 247–53. doi:10.1136/ip.2009.022491. PMID 20587817.
- Gjertsen, Finn; Leenaars, Antoon; Vollrath, Margarete (30 December 2013). "Mixed Impact of Firearms Restrictions on Fatal Firearm Injuries in Males: A National Observational Study". International Journal of Environmental Research and Public Health. 11 (1): 487–506. doi:10.3390/ijerph110100487. PMC 3924456. PMID 24380979.
- Hahn, RA; Bilukha, O; Crosby, A; et al. (February 2005). "Firearms laws and the reduction of violence: a systematic review". American Journal of Preventive Medicine. 28 (2 Suppl 1): 40–71. doi:10.1016/j.amepre.2004.10.005. PMID 15698747.
- Hemenway, D. (2009). "How to find nothing". Journal of Public Health Policy. 30 (3): 260–68. doi:10.1057/jphp.2009.26. PMID 19806067.
- Hemenway, David (March 2016). "Firearm legislation and mortality in the USA". The Lancet. 387 (10030): 1796–97. doi:10.1016/S0140-6736(16)00206-3. PMID 26972841. S2CID 37771810.
- Hemenway, D.; Miller, M. (2000). "Firearm availability and homicide rates across 26 high-income countries". The Journal of Trauma. 49 (6): 985–88. doi:10.1097/00005373-200012000-00001. PMID 11130511.
- Hepburn, L. M.; Hemenway, D. (2004). "Firearm availability and homicide: A review of the literature". Aggression and Violent Behavior. 9 (4): 417–40. doi:10.1016/S1359-1789(03)00044-2.
- Huemer, Michael (2003). "Is There a Right to Own a Gun?". Social Theory and Practice. 29 (2): 297–324. doi:10.5840/soctheorpract200329215. Archived from the original on 2017-12-13.
- Irvin, N; Rhodes, K; Cheney, R; Wiebe, D (August 2014). "Evaluating the effect of state regulation of federally licensed firearm dealers on firearm homicide". American Journal of Public Health. 104 (8): 1384–86. doi:10.2105/ajph.2014.301999. PMC 4103238. PMID 24922158.
- Juma, Monica Kathina, ed. (2006). Compendium of Key Documents Relating to Peace and Security in Africa. Series on peace and conflict in Africa. Pretoria: Pretoria University Law Press. ISBN 978-0-9585097-3-2. Archived from the original on 2021-06-13.
- Kalesan, Bindu; Mobily, Matthew E; Keiser, Olivia; et al. (March 2016). "Firearm legislation and firearm mortality in the USA: a cross-sectional, state-level study" (PDF). The Lancet. 387 (10030): 1847–55. doi:10.1016/S0140-6736(15)01026-0. PMID 26972843. S2CID 21415884. Archived (PDF) from the original on 2020-02-13.
- Kapusta, ND; Etzersdorfer, E; Krall, C; Sonneck, G (September 2007). "Firearm legislation reform in the European Union: impact on firearm availability, firearm suicide and homicide rates in Austria". The British Journal of Psychiatry. 191 (3): 253–57. doi:10.1192/bjp.bp.106.032862. PMID 17766767.
- Karp, Aaron (2010). "Elusive Arsenals: Gang and Group Firearms". In Berman, Eric G.; et al. (eds.). Small Arms Survey 2010: Gangs, Groups, and Guns. Cambridge: Cambridge University Press. ISBN 978-0-521-14684-5. Archived from the original on 2010-11-04.
- Karp, Aaron (2007). "Completing the Count: Civilian Firearms" (PDF). In Berman, Eric G.; et al. (eds.). Small Arms Survey 2007: Guns and the City. Cambridge: Cambridge University Press. ISBN 978-0-521-70654-4. Archived from the original on 2018-08-27.
- Kates, D. B. (1983). "Handgun Prohibition and the Original Meaning of the Second Amendment" (PDF). Michigan Law Review. 82 (2): 204–73. doi:10.2307/1288537. JSTOR 1288537. Archived (PDF) from the original on 2014-12-22.
- Kates, D. B.; Mauser, G. A. (2007). "Would Banning Firearms Reduce Murder and Suicide? A Review of International and Some Domestic Evidence" (PDF). Harvard Journal of Law & Public Policy. 30 (2): 649–94. Archived from the original (PDF) on 2008-09-10.
- Kellermann, A. L.; Rivara, F. P.; Somes, G.; et al. (1992). "Suicide in the Home in Relation to Gun Ownership". New England Journal of Medicine. 327 (7): 467–72. doi:10.1056/NEJM199208133270705. PMID 1308093. S2CID 35031090.
- Kellermann, Arthur L.; Rivara, Frederick P.; Rushforth, Norman B.; et al. (7 October 1993). "Gun Ownership as a Risk Factor for Homicide in the Home". New England Journal of Medicine. 329 (15): 1084–91. doi:10.1056/NEJM199310073291506. PMID 8371731.
- Killias, Martin (1993). "Gun ownership, suicide and homicide: an international perspective" ( (PDF)). In Del Frate, A. A.; et al. (eds.). Understanding crime: experiences of crime and crime control (Report). Rome: UNICRI. pp. 289–306. Archived from the original on 2013-12-24.
- Killias, M.; van Kesteren, J.; Rindlisbacher, M. (2001). "Guns, violent crime, and suicide in 21 countries". Canadian Journal of Criminology. 43 (4): 429–48. doi:10.3138/cjcrim.43.4.429.
- Kleck, G.; Patterson, E. B. (1993). "The impact of gun control and gun ownership levels on violence rates". Journal of Quantitative Criminology. 9 (3): 249–87. doi:10.1007/BF01064462. S2CID 144180611.
- Klieve, Helen; Barnes, Michael; De Leo, Diego (2009) [Epub: 4 October 2008]. "Controlling firearms use in Australia: has the 1996 gun law reform produced the decrease in rates of suicide with this method?". Social Psychiatry and Psychiatric Epidemiology. 44 (4): 285–92. doi:10.1007/s00127-008-0435-9. PMID 18839044. S2CID 22624912.
- Kposowa, A; Hamilton, D; Wang, K (21 March 2016). "Impact of Firearm Availability and Gun Regulation on State Suicide Rates". Suicide and Life-Threatening Behavior. 46 (6): 678–96. doi:10.1111/sltb.12243. PMID 26999372.
- Krug, E.; Powell, K. E.; Dahlberg, L. L. (1998). "Firearm-related deaths in the United States and 35 other high- and upper-middle-income countries". International Journal of Epidemiology. 27 (2): 214–21. doi:10.1093/ije/27.2.214. PMID 9602401.
- Kwon, Ik-Whan G.; Scott, Bradley; Safranski, Scott R.; Bae, Muen (24 August 2010). "The Effectiveness of Gun Control Laws". American Journal of Economics and Sociology. 56 (1): 41–50. doi:10.1111/j.1536-7150.1997.tb03449.x.
- LaPierre, W. (1994). Guns, crime, and freedom. Washington, D.C.: Regnery. ISBN 978-0-89526-477-0.
- Lambert, Michael T.; Silva, Peter S. (1998). "An Update on the Impact of Gun Control Legislation on Suicide". Psychiatric Quarterly. 69 (2): 127–34. doi:10.1023/A:1024714619938. PMID 9627930. S2CID 37048769.
- Langmann, C. (10 February 2012). "Canadian Firearms Legislation and Effects on Homicide 1974 to 2008". Journal of Interpersonal Violence. 27 (12): 2303–21. doi:10.1177/0886260511433515. PMID 22328660. S2CID 42273865.
- Lanza, Steven P. (3 April 2014). "The effect of firearm restrictions on gun-related homicides across US states". Applied Economics Letters. 21 (13): 902–05. doi:10.1080/13504851.2014.896977. S2CID 154724050.
- Lee, Wang-Sheng; Suardi, Sandy (January 2010). "The Australian Firearms Buyback and ITS Effect on Gun Deaths". Contemporary Economic Policy. 28 (1): 65–79. doi:10.1111/j.1465-7287.2009.00165.x. S2CID 53520961.
- Lee, LK; Fleegler, EW; Farrell, C; et al. (14 November 2016). "Firearm Laws and Firearm Homicides: A Systematic Review". JAMA Internal Medicine. 177 (1): 106–19. doi:10.1001/jamainternmed.2016.7051. PMID 27842178. S2CID 205119294.
- Leenaars, Antoon A; Lester, David (July 2001). "The impact of gun control (Bill C-51) on homicide in Canada". Journal of Criminal Justice. 29 (4): 287–94. doi:10.1016/S0047-2352(01)00094-0.
- Leenaars, Antoon A.; Moksony, Ferenc; Lester, David; Wenckstern, Susanne (February 2003). "The Impact of Gun Control (Bill C-51) on Suicide in Canada". Death Studies. 27 (2): 103–24. doi:10.1080/07481180302890. PMID 12675070. S2CID 10059933.
- Leigh, A.; Neill, C. (20 August 2010). "Do Gun Buybacks Save Lives? Evidence from Panel Data". American Law and Economics Review. 12 (2): 509–57. doi:10.1093/aler/ahq013. hdl:10419/36943. S2CID 787141.
- Lester, David; Leenaars, Antoon (June 1993). "Suicide Rates in Canada before and after Tightening Firearm Control Laws". Psychological Reports. 72 (3): 787–90. doi:10.2466/pr0.1993.72.3.787. PMID 8332684. S2CID 25191464.
- Loftin, Colin; McDowall, David; Wiersema, Brian; Cottey, Talbert J. (5 December 1991). "Effects of Restrictive Licensing of Handguns on Homicide and Suicide in the District of Columbia". New England Journal of Medicine. 325 (23): 1615–20. doi:10.1056/NEJM199112053252305. PMID 1669841.
- Lott, J. R. (2010). More guns, less crime understanding crime and gun-control laws (3rd ed.). Chicago: University of Chicago Press. ISBN 978-0-226-49367-1. Archived from the original on 2022-05-31.
- Lott, J. R. (2012). "What a Balancing Test Will Show for Right-to-Carry Laws". University of Maryland Law Review. 71 (4): 1205–18. Archived from the original on 2013-12-24.
- Lubin, Gad; Werbeloff, Nomi; Halperin, Demian; et al. (October 2010). "Decrease in Suicide Rates After a Change of Policy Reducing Access to Firearms in Adolescents: A Naturalistic Epidemiological Study". Suicide and Life-Threatening Behavior. 40 (5): 421–24. doi:10.1521/suli.2010.40.5.421. PMID 21034205.
- Luca, Michael; Malhotra, Deepak; Poliquin, Christopher (16 October 2017). "Handgun waiting periods reduce gun deaths". Proceedings of the National Academy of Sciences. 114 (46): 12162–65. Bibcode:2017PNAS..11412162L. doi:10.1073/pnas.1619896114. ISSN 0027-8424. PMC 5699026. PMID 29078268.
- Ludwig, Jens; Cook, Phillip J. (2 August 2000). "Homicide and Suicide Rates Associated With Implementation of the Brady Handgun Violence Prevention Act". JAMA. 284 (5): 585–91. doi:10.1001/jama.284.5.585. PMID 10918704.
- Malcolm, Joyce (1994). To Keep and Bear Arms: The Origins of an Anglo-American Right. Cambridge, MA: Harvard University Press. ISBN 978-0-674-89306-1.
- Malcolm, Joyce (2002). Guns and violence: The English experience. Cambridge, Mass: Harvard University Press. ISBN 978-0-674-00753-6.
- Matzopoulos, Richard G.; Thompson, Mary Lou; Myers, Jonathan E. (March 2014). "Firearm and Nonfirearm Homicide in 5 South African Cities: A Retrospective Population-Based Study". American Journal of Public Health. 104 (3): 455–60. doi:10.2105/AJPH.2013.310650. PMC 3953758. PMID 24432917.
- Mauser, G. A.; Holmes, R. A. (1 December 1992). "An Evaluation of the 1977 Canadian Firearms Legislation". Evaluation Review. 16 (6): 603–17. doi:10.1177/0193841X9201600602. S2CID 144576514.
- Mauser, Gary A.; Maki, Dennis (April 2003). "An evaluation of the 1977 Canadian firearm legislation: robbery involving a firearm". Applied Economics. 35 (4): 423–36. doi:10.1080/00036840210143099. S2CID 154344131.
- McPhedran, S; Mauser, G (2013). "Lethal firearm-related violence against Canadian women: did tightening gun laws have an impact on women's health and safety?". Violence and Victims. 28 (5): 875–83. doi:10.1891/0886-6708.vv-d-12-00145. hdl:10072/57640. PMID 24364129. S2CID 21714121.
- Medoff, M. H.; Magaddino, J. P. (1 January 1983). "Suicides and Firearm Control Laws". Evaluation Review. 7 (3): 357–72. doi:10.1177/0193841X8300700305. S2CID 145607862.
- Miller, M. (1978). "Geriatric Suicide: The Arizona Study". The Gerontologist. 18 (5 Part 1): 488–95. doi:10.1093/geront/18.5_Part_1.488. PMID 263566.
- Miller, M.; Azrael, D.; Hemenway, D. (2002). "Rates of Household Firearm Ownership and Homicide Across US Regions and States, 1988–1997". American Journal of Public Health. 92 (12): 1988–93. doi:10.2105/AJPH.92.12.1988. PMC 1447364. PMID 12453821.
- Miller, M.; Hemenway, D.; Azrael, D. (2007). "State-level homicide victimization rates in the US in relation to survey measures of household firearm ownership, 2001–2003". Social Science & Medicine. 64 (3): 656–64. doi:10.1016/j.socscimed.2006.09.024. PMID 17070975.
- Miller, M.; Hemenway, D. (2008). "Guns and Suicide in the United States". New England Journal of Medicine. 359 (10): 989–91. doi:10.1056/NEJMp0805923. PMID 18768940.
- National Research Council (2005). Wellford, C. F.; Pepper, J. V.; Petrie, C. V. (eds.). Firearms and Violence: A Critical Review. Committee to Improve Research Information and Data on Firearms. Washington, DC: The National Academies Press. ISBN 978-0-309-09124-4. Archived from the original on 2008-10-13.
- Ozanne-Smith, J.; Ashby, K.; Newstead, S.; et al. (2004). "Firearm related deaths: The impact of regulatory reform". Injury Prevention. 10 (5): 280–86. doi:10.1136/ip.2003.004150. PMC 1730132. PMID 15470007.
- Parker, Sarah (2011). "Balancing Acts: Regulation of Civilian Firearm Possession". In Berman, Eric G.; et al. (eds.). Small Arms Survey 2011: States of Security. Cambridge: Cambridge University Press. ISBN 978-0-521-14686-9. Archived from the original on 2011-07-11.
- Perrin, Noel (1980). Giving Up the Gun: Japan's Reversion to the Sword, 1543–1879. Shambhala. ISBN 978-0-87773-184-9. Archived from the original on 2020-02-13.
- Pierce, GL; Braga, AA; Wintemute, GJ (June 2015). "Impact of California firearms sales laws and dealer regulations on the illegal diversion of guns". Injury Prevention. 21 (3): 179–84. doi:10.1136/injuryprev-2014-041413. PMID 25472991. S2CID 41375606.
- Price, James H.; Thompson, Amy J.; Dake, Joseph A. (August 2004). "Factors Associated with State Variations in Homicide, Suicide, and Unintentional Firearm Deaths". Journal of Community Health. 29 (4): 271–83. doi:10.1023/B:JOHE.0000025326.89365.5c. PMID 15186014. S2CID 12678341.
- Reisch, T; Steffen, T; Habenstein, A; Tschacher, W (September 2013). "Change in suicide rates in Switzerland before and after firearm restriction resulting from the 2003 "Army XXI" reform". The American Journal of Psychiatry. 170 (9): 977–84. doi:10.1176/appi.ajp.2013.12091256. PMID 23897090.
- Reuter, Peter; Mouzos, Jenny (2003). "Australia: A Massive Buyback of Low-Risk Guns". In Ludwig, J.; Cook, P. J. (eds.). Evaluating Gun Policy: Effects on Crime and Violence (PDF). Brookings Institution Press. pp. 121–56. ISBN 978-0-8157-5337-7. Archived from the original (PDF) on 2013-10-20.
- Rodríguez Andrés, Antonio; Hempstead, Katherine (June 2011). "Gun control and suicide: The impact of state firearm regulations in the United States, 1995–2004". Health Policy. 101 (1): 95–103. doi:10.1016/j.healthpol.2010.10.005. PMID 21044804.
- Rosengart, M; Cummings, P; Nathens, A; et al. (April 2005). "An evaluation of state firearm regulations and homicide and suicide death rates". Injury Prevention. 11 (2): 77–83. doi:10.1136/ip.2004.007062. PMC 1730198. PMID 15805435.
- Rudolph, KE; Stuart, EA; Vernick, JS; Webster, DW (August 2015). "Association Between Connecticut's Permit-to-Purchase Handgun Law and Homicides". American Journal of Public Health. 105 (8): e49–54. doi:10.2105/ajph.2015.302703. PMC 4504296. PMID 26066959.
- Safavi, A; Rhee, P; Pandit, V; et al. (January 2014). "Children are safer in states with strict firearm laws: a National Inpatient Sample study". The Journal of Trauma and Acute Care Surgery. 76 (1): 146–50, discussion 150–51. doi:10.1097/ta.0b013e3182ab10fb. PMID 24368370. S2CID 11563737.
- Santaella-Tenorio, Julian; Cerdá, Magdalena; Villaveces, Andrés; Galea, Sandro (10 February 2016). "What Do We Know About the Association Between Firearm Legislation and Firearm-Related Injuries?". Epidemiologic Reviews. 38 (1): 140–57. doi:10.1093/epirev/mxv012. PMC 6283012. PMID 26905895.
- Simonetti, Joseph A.; Rowhani-Rahbar, Ali; Mills, Brianna; et al. (August 2015). "State Firearm Legislation and Nonfatal Firearm Injuries". American Journal of Public Health. 105 (8): 1703–09. doi:10.2105/AJPH.2015.302617. PMC 4504301. PMID 26066935.
- Sloan, JH; Rivara, FP; Reay, DT; et al. (8 February 1990). "Firearm regulations and rates of suicide. A comparison of two metropolitan areas". The New England Journal of Medicine. 322 (6): 369–73. doi:10.1056/nejm199002083220605. PMID 2393410.
- Tahmassebi, S. B. (Summer 1991). "Gun Control and Racism". George Mason University Civil Rights Law Journal. 2 (1): 67–100. Archived from the original on 2000-08-16.
- Tashiro, J; Lane, RS; Blass, LW; et al. (3 August 2016). "The Effect of Gun Control Laws on Hospital Admissions for Children in the United States". The Journal of Trauma and Acute Care Surgery. 81 (4 Suppl 1): S54–60. doi:10.1097/TA.0000000000001177. PMID 27488481. S2CID 25217599.
- Villaveces, Andrés; Cummings, Peter; Espitia, Victoria E.; et al. (1 March 2000). "Effect of a Ban on Carrying Firearms on Homicide Rates in 2 Colombian Cities". JAMA. 283 (9): 1205–09. doi:10.1001/jama.283.9.1205. PMID 10703790.
- Webster, DW; Vernick, JS; Zeoli, AM; Manganello, JA (4 August 2004). "Association between youth-focused firearm laws and youth suicides". JAMA. 292 (5): 594–601. doi:10.1001/jama.292.5.594. PMID 15292085.
- Webster, Daniel; Crifasi, Cassandra Kercher; Vernick, Jon S. (7 March 2014). "Effects of the Repeal of Missouri's Handgun Purchaser Licensing Law on Homicides". Journal of Urban Health. 91 (2): 293–302. doi:10.1007/s11524-014-9865-8. PMC 3978146. PMID 24604521.
- Webster, Daniel W.; Wintemute, Garen J. (18 March 2015). "Effects of Policies Designed to Keep Firearms from High-Risk Individuals". Annual Review of Public Health. 36 (1): 21–37. doi:10.1146/annurev-publhealth-031914-122516. PMID 25581152.
- Winkler, A. (2013). Gunfight: the battle over the right to bear arms in America. New York: W.W. Norton & Co. ISBN 978-0-393-34583-4. Archived from the original on 2022-05-31.
- Zeoli, April M.; Malinski, Rebecca; Turchan, Brandon (5 January 2016). "Risks and Targeted Interventions: Firearms in Intimate Partner Violence". Epidemiologic Reviews. 38 (1): 125–39. doi:10.1093/epirev/mxv007. PMID 26739680.
