= Sporting Shooters Association of Australia =

Sporting Shooters' Association of Australia
- Formation: 15 April 1948
- Headquarters: Adelaide, South Australia; Sydney, New South Wales; Canberra, ACT
- Members: 218,700
- President: Andrew Judd
- CEO: Tom Kenyon
- Website: www.ssaa.org.au

The Sporting Shooters' Association of Australia (SSAA) is a federated non-government organisation established in 1948 as a representative body to promote shooting sports and protect the legal rights and interests of firearm owners in Australia. As of 2022 the SSAA has a membership of around 218,000. In addition to the state branches overseeing various clubs and gun ranges, SSAA also has a national political lobbying department and an insurance arm. State branches run local- and state-level shooting competitions, while the SSAA also coordinates competitions at the national and international levels.

== History ==
On April 15, 1948, about 100 shooters met in the Sydney's Railway Institute Building in Elizabeth Street to form The Sporting Shooters’ Association of Australia. One of the most notable changes since that time is the number of members, which continues to increase each year. In 1959, it had a mere 250 members, compared to today’s 218,700 members. Membership fees have also increased since the SSAA first formed in 1948, with urban members paid 10 shillings and country members paid 7/6.

The SSAA began in New South Wales because of the government’s increasing involvement in firearms legislation. In 1950, NSW adopted the title of "SSAA NSW" so everyone was clear that it was not just a "one-state organisation". State branches came into being at different times, with Victoria in 1951, Queensland in 1957, South Australia in 1964, the Northern Territory in 1965-66, the ACT in 1965, Western Australia in 1967 and Tasmania in 1969.

In 1962, SSAA National came to life as a result of a meeting consisting of 12 people. The group agreed that there was a need for a federal body, whose purpose would be to assist and advise state bodies.

== Structure ==
The SSAA is organised at the bottom level as local sporting clubs, around locations and/or speciality shooting disciplines or conservation activities. Members may be unaffiliated with a club, or members of one or more clubs. Clubs are organised in branches, where each club sends two voting delegates to the branch AGM. A state may have one or more branches according to the population and size of membership. State level executive teams deal with state level sporting management and legislative issues, and elect the SSAA National Executive Board. SSAA states it is independent of any political party and supports politicians who support recreational shooting and hunting while condemning those that work against its members' interests.

== Activities ==
The SSAA at the club and branch level has many thousands of volunteers and officials running competitions and managing facilities of their clubs for all levels of competition. The SSAA manages more than 16 handgun, rifle and shotgun shooting competitions at the local, state, national and international levels, as well as having several branches devoted to historic and collectible firearms.

The SSAA runs its own political lobbying department, the SSAA Legislative Action (SSAA-LA). The SSAA-LA is "dedicated to ensuring Australians are able to exercise their freedoms and calling out those who threaten those freedoms", and focuses on important political news, national and international perspectives on legislative and regulatory developments and other time-sensitive matters. The SSAA National E-newsletter is a free-of-charge subscription email service available to SSAA members, which allows subscribers to select preferred contents between regular and/or SSAA-LA news. Regular news includes current and upcoming news, views and events about firearms ownership, sport shooting and recreational hunting issues, plus special offers. SSAA-LA news includes important political news, national and international perspectives on legislative and regulatory developments and other time-sensitive matters.

The SSAA also comprises an insurance arm, the SSAA Insurance Brokers Pty Ltd, which is based in Fullarton, South Australia and provides general insurance for the majority of major shooting organisations within Australia, as well as public liability insurance for SSAA members while shooting or hunting.

== Conservation and Wildlife Management ==
SSAA South Australia created its Conservation & Wildlife Management (CWM) branch in the 1990s, which focuses on the management of feral animals in South Australia. These include goats, gats, pigs, foxes and wild dogs, as well as occasional native species (in particular kangaroos) which are having a negative impact on the environment. CWM collaborates with government departments, non-government organisations, private landholders and universities, and offers a free service to land managers to target a specific species. One of their most successful projects was "Operation Bounceback" in the Flinders Ranges of South Australia. It has won recognition and awards from government, the University of Adelaide, volunteer groups and the Nature Foundation.

== Facilities ==
Each SSAA state branch runs/leases a number of shooting ranges and facilities, open to both SSAA members and non-members with varying fees and rules:

=== New South Wales ===
Metropolitan

- ANZAC (at Malabar Headland)
- St. Marys
- Silverdale
- Hornsby
- Holroyd (at Greystanes)

Regional

- Coffs Harbour (at Dairyville)
- Ballina
- Kempsey
- Macksville
- Port Macquarie
- Cessnock
- Grafton (at South Grafton)
- Taree/Wingham
- Merriwa
- Newcastle (at East Seaham)
- Snowy River (Coolamatong)
- Southern Highlands (at Berrima)
- Goulburn
- Illawarra (at Hill Top)
- Batemans Bay
- Tenterfield
- Urbenville/Woodenbong
- Guyra (at Armidale)
- Kyogle
- Northern Rivers (at Casino)
- Glen Innes (at Emmaville)
- Armidale (at Balala)
- Mudgee (at Cudgegong)
- Orange
- Bathurst
- Deep Lead (at Parkes)
- Parkes (at Eugowra)
- Coonabarabran (at Ulamambri)
- Dubbo (at Wuuluman)
- Fairlight (at Moonan Flat)
- Forbes
- Gilgandra
- Grenfell
- Albury (at Ettamogah)
- Tumut
- Wagga Wagga (near Livingstone National Park)
- West Wyalong
- Hay
- Leeton/Narrandera (at Yanco)
- Griffith (also at Rankins Springs)
- Narrabri/Gunnedah
- Broken Hill

=== ACT ===
- Majura

=== Victoria ===
Metropolitan

- Springvale
- Eagle Park (at You Yangs, near Little River)

Regional

- Bendigo (at Marong)
- Cobaw/Kyneton (at Lancefield)
- Bonang (at Bendoc)
- Nhill (at Kaniva and Lillimur)
- Daylesford (at Trentham East)
- East Gippsland (at Buchan South)
- Wodonga (at Barnawartha North)
- Portland
- Warrnambool (at Allansford)
- Mildura (at Cardross)
- Shepparton (at Pine Lodge)

=== Queensland ===
Regional

- Biloela

=== Western Australia ===
Wanneroo Shooting Complex Jarrahdale Shooting Complex Mundaring Shooting Complex

=== Tasmania ===
Metropolitan

- Oakdale (at Warrane)
- Glenorchy

Regional

- Bracknell
- Westbury
- Sheffield (at Lake Barrington and East Sassafras)
- Scottsdale
- Huon (at Franklin)
- Blue Hills (at Copping)
- St. Helens
- Waratah
- Spring Bay (at Ashgrove)
- Bruny Island (at Alonnah)
- Macquarie (at Ross)
- King Island (at Lymwood)

=== Northern Territory ===
- Micket Creek (at Berrimah)
- Alice Springs (at Ilparpa)

== Publications ==
The SSAA publishes a range of publications, including:

- Australian Shooter (monthly)
- Australian Hunter (quarterly)
- Australian & New Zealand Handgun (annual)
- SSAA's Comprehensive Guide to Shooting & Hunting in Australia
- Shooting and the SSAA - A Beginner's Guide
- A Journalist's Guide to Firearms and the Shooting Sports
- ASJ: The political voice of the SSAA
- SSAA National E-newsletter
- Field to Fork - The Australian Game Cookbook.

== Revenue ==
The national branch of the SSAA collects tens of millions of dollars in annual fees.

== See also ==
- Gun laws in Australia
