= Simon Chapman (academic) =

Australian academic and antismoking activist

- Born: Simon Fenton Chapman; 14 December 1951 (age 74); Bowral, New South Wales, Australia
- Occupation: Public health academic
- Known for: Anti-tobacco activism
- Awards: World Health Organization's World No Tobacco Day Medal (1997); National Heart Foundation of Australia's gold medal (1999)

Simon Fenton Chapman, AO (born 14 December 1951) is an Australian academic and tobacco control activist.

== Life and career ==
Chapman was born in Bowral, New South Wales to Margaret and Alec Chapman who had emigrated from England in 1948. He is an Emeritus Professor in Public Health at the University of Sydney. In his PhD in social medicine he examined the semiotics of cigarette advertising. He has authored 21 books and major reports, 338 papers and editorials, and 198 letters and commentaries in peer reviewed journals.

Chapman is a regular writer on public health matters in leading Australian newspapers and blogs, having written some 470 opinion page and journalistic articles since 1981. His main research interests are in tobacco control, media discourses on health and illness, and risk communication. He taught annual courses in Public Health Advocacy and Tobacco Control in the University of Sydney's MPH program. He wrote a regular column, Smoke Signals, on public health matters for The Conversation from January 2015-August 2017 which by February 2022 had been read 3.6 million times. He blogs at simonchapman6.com

In 1997 Chapman won the World Health Organization's World No Tobacco Day Medal; in 1999, the National Heart Foundation of Australia's gold medal; in 2006 the Thoracic Society of Australia & New Zealand President's Award. In 2003 he was voted by his international peers to be awarded the American Cancer Society's Luther L. Terry Award for outstanding individual leadership in tobacco control. In 2005, his research on the tobacco industry was selected by the National Health and Medical Research Council as being one of its "top 10" projects. He was foundational deputy editor of the British Medical Journal's specialist journal, Tobacco Control from 1992 to 1998, and its editor from 1999 to 2008. He was Tobacco Control's commissioning editor for Low and Middle Income Countries from 2008 to 2010 and is now editor emeritus.

Chapman studied health complaints regarding wind farms in Australia in 2012 and concluded the complaints were likely to be the result of nocebo effects.

In 2008 he was awarded the $50,000 NSW Premier's award for Cancer Researcher of the Year, voted to become a Fellow of the Academy of Social Sciences in Australia, won the Public Health Association of Australia's Sidney Sax medal, and was included in the Sydney Morning Herald's Sydney Magazine list of 100 of Sydney's most influential people. He appeared in that magazine's list again in 2012. In 2013 he was given a Distinguished Professorial Award by the faculty of Medicine at the University of Sydney and made an Honorary Fellow of the Faculty of Public Health of the Royal College of Physicians (UK).

Simon Chapman is a life member of the Australian Consumers' Association and was its chairman 1999–2002. He served on the board of The Cancer Council New South Wales for nine years until 2006. He was a key member of the Coalition for Gun Control which won the 1996 Australian Human Rights and Equal Opportunity Commission's Community Human Rights award for its advocacy for gun law reform after the Port Arthur massacre in 1996. The Australian Skeptics Inc conferred on him the award of Australian Skeptic of the Year in 2013.

He was a staff elected Fellow of Senate, at the University of Sydney from 2007 to 2011. He was a board member of Action on Smoking and Health (ASH) from 1996 to 2013.

He was lead singer with a Sydney-based rock covers band, the Original Faux Pas, from 2007 to 2012 and then with The Bleeding Hearts.

In November 2019, he directed the inaugural St.Anmoré (Stanmore) Festival of Music to honour the late conductor and musical educator Richard Gill AO. He was awarded senior citizen of the year 2020 by Sydney's Inner West Council.

Chapman was made an Officer (AO) in the General Division of the Order of Australia on 10 June 2013.

He retired in January 2016 and was awarded Emeritus Professor status by the University of Sydney commencing 2016.

In December 2017, Public Health England accused him of presenting factual errors during a Federal Government Enquiry His full reply to these claims was published in Hansard (submission 313.1

== Selected books ==
- Chapman, Simon (2022). Quit Smoking Weapons of Mass Distraction. Sydney University Press. doi:10.30722/sup.9781743328538. hdl:2123/28576. ISBN 978-1-74332-853-8. S2CID 249978397.
- Chapman, S, Crichton, F (2017) Wind turbine syndrome: a communicated disease. (Sydney, Sydney University Press)
- Chapman, S. (2016) Smoke signals: selected writing. (Sydney, Darlington Press)
- Chapman, S, Freeman B. (2014) Removing the emperor's clothes: tobacco plain packaging in Australia. (Sydney, Sydney University Press, ISBN 9781743323977)
- Chapman, S, Barratt A, Stockler M.(2010) Let sleeping dogs lie? What men should know before getting tested for prostate cancer. (Sydney, Sydney University Press)
- Chapman, S. (2007) Public health advocacy and tobacco control: making smoking history (Oxford, Blackwell)
- Chapman, S. (1998) Over our dead bodies: Port Arthur and Australia's fight for gun control (Sydney, Pluto Press). Reprinted 2013 by Sydney University Press
- Chapman, S. (1995) The last right?: Australians take sides on the right to die (Sydney: Mandarin)
- Chapman, S. & Lupton, D. (1994) The fight for public health: principles and practice of media advocacy (London, BMJ).
- Chapman, S. (1990) Tobacco in the third world: a resource atlas (International Organisation of Consumers' Unions).
- Chapman, S. (1986) Great expectorations: advertising and the tobacco industry (London: Comedia).
- Chapman, S. (1983) The lung goodbye: tactics for counteracting the tobacco industry in the 1980s (International Organisation of Consumers' Unions).
