= Robby Poblete Foundation =

Non-profit organisation based in California, USA

The Robby Poblete Foundation is an American non-profit organization based in Vallejo, a city in the San Francisco Bay Area in California. The organization which aims to reduce the number of illegal guns through a gun buyback program. The organization's other initiatives include an Art of Peace program where artists create sculptures and other artworks from melted and disassembled guns and advocacy and awareness of the reduction of crime through the promotion of skilled trades. The organization's founder is Pati Navalta Poblete, who established it in her son's memory.

== Activities ==
- Buyback Program - The organization has organized gun buyback events, to reduce the number of guns available in the Bay Area. The events are run in coordination with local police, and are used in the organization's art program.
- Art of Peace - The organization has run art exhibitions from artists whose work includes guns from the organization's buyback program.
- Other activities - The organization aims to reduce criminal activity by promoting skilled trades to High School students. The foundation provides scholarships for students to study commercial driving and building trades through apprenticeship programs. The organization also has organized job training for inmates, to enable them to transition back to society.

== Founder ==
The organization was founded by Pati Navalta whose 23-year-old son, Robby Poblete, was murdered in Vallejo in 2014. The gun used in the murder was purchased illegally.

Pati Navalta, a former journalist for The San Francisco Chronicle and editor-in-chief of San Francisco magazine, subsequently authored a book titled A Better Place: A Memoir of Peace in the Face of Tragedy which recounts the pain of the loss of her son, and her activism efforts.

== Awards ==
The Robby Poblete Foundation was named Nonprofit of the Year for California's 14th State Assembly district for its work to prevent gun violence.

== See also ==
- Gun buyback program
