= Mindich =

Mindich is a surname. Notable people with the surname include:

- David Mindich, American historian
- Jessica Mindich, American lawyer
- Timur Mindich (born 1979), Ukrainian-Israeli entrepreneur
