= Jessica Mindich =

American lawyer and businesswoman

Jessica Mindich is a former lawyer and the founder and CEO of the Caliber Collection (FKA Jewelry for a Cause), which takes guns off streets and transforms them with bullet casings into jewelry and nonprofit donations.

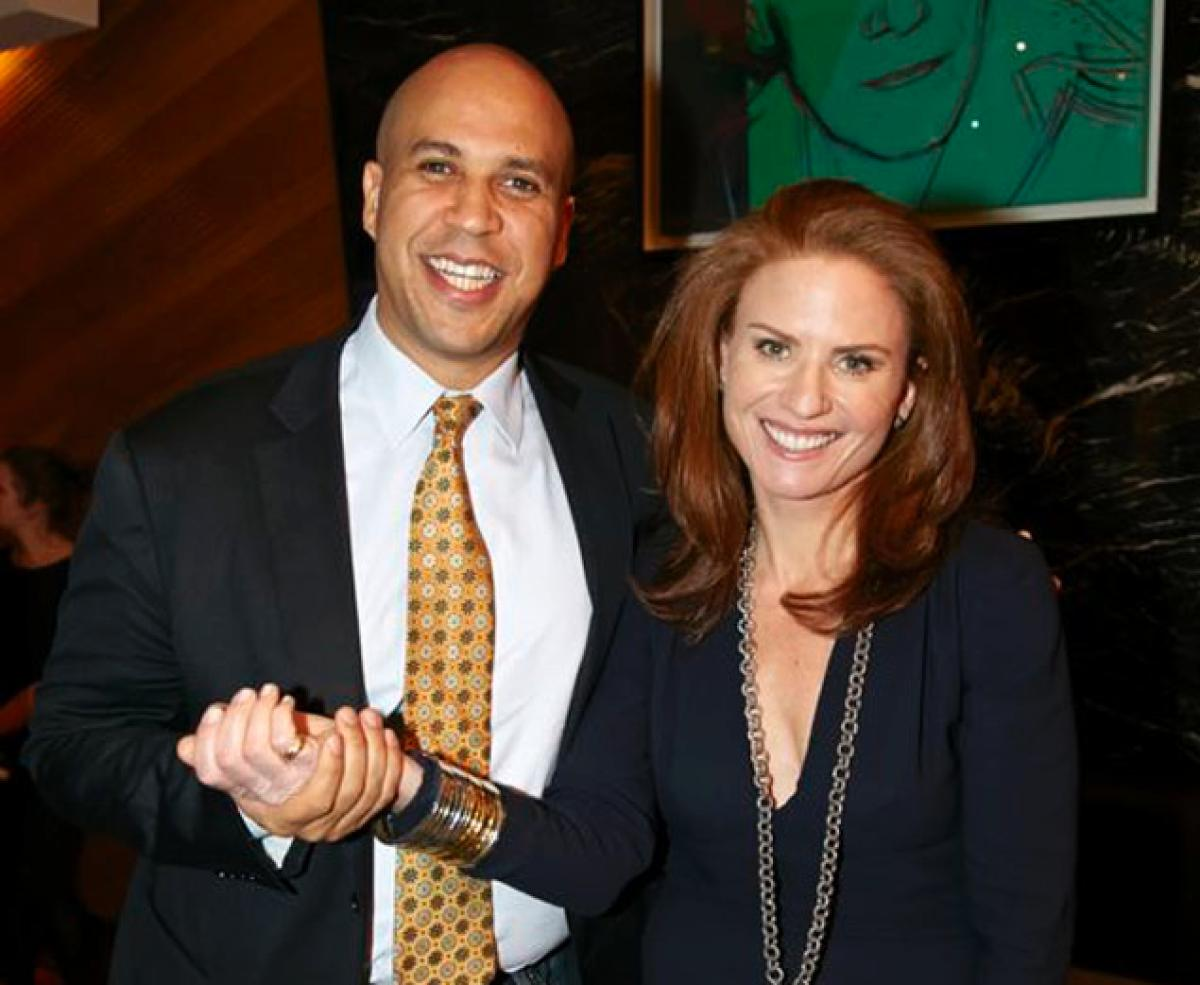
Newark Mayor Cory Booker has teamed up with jewelry designer Jessica Mindich to repurpose some of the guns and bullet casings to create bracelets that raise awareness about gun violence. (COURTESY OF JESSICA MINDICH)

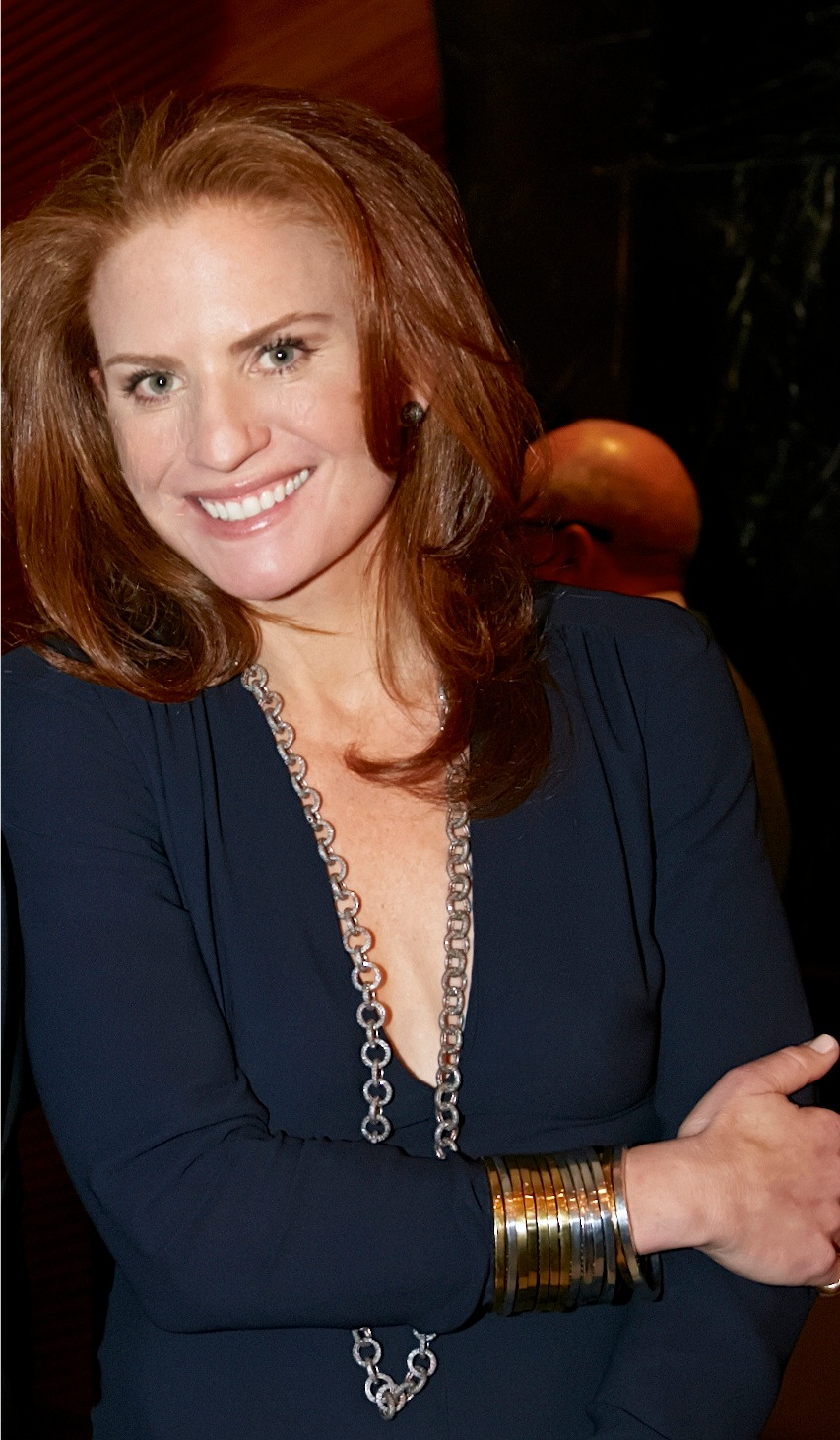
Founder and CEO of the Caliber Collection, formerly known as Jewelry for a Cause.

== Caliber Collection ==
The Caliber Collection began in January 2012 in collaboration with the Mayor of Newark, NJ, Cory Booker, as a way to turn illegal and unwanted guns into jewelry. 20% of the net proceeds are to fund voluntary gun buyback and amnesty programs. Since then, Caliber has partnered additionally with San Francisco, Detroit, Hartford, and most recently North Miami Beach. To date, the programs have taken 2,500 illegal guns off the streets of those cities and has raised over $165,000 for police departments.

=== Gun Buyback and Amnesty Programs ===
In 2013, Jessica Mindich was able to present the Mayor Booker of Newark, NJ with a check for $40,000, as a result of nine weeks of sales, to fund her first gun buyback and amnesty program in Newark, NJ. A second buyback was funded in Newark by Mindich's company in 2014 and collected 185 guns ranging from sniper rifles to assault weapons.

In 2016, Mindich donated $25,000 to the Wayne County Sheriff's Office in Michigan to buyback 500 guns.

== Caliber Foundation ==
The Caliber Foundation is a registered 501(c)(3) organization that supports victims and communities affected by illegal gun violence.

=== Notable Contributors ===
In 2014, Serena Williams and the Serena Williams Fund announced a grant to the Caliber Foundation to prevent young people from experiencing the same pain Williams' had through the murder of her sister in 2003.

In 2016, street artist Shepard Fairey donated 20% of sales from his art exhibit at the Library Street Collective in Detroit, MI. In July 2016, Fairey also dedicated a portion of the proceeds of the sale from his gun control American Civics collaboration with photographer Jim Marshall to the Caliber Foundation.

== Raise The Caliber ==
Mindich is also the founder of the Raise The Caliber initiative, a national advocacy campaign to end illegal gun violence. Proceeds from partnerships under Raise The Caliber are donated to the Caliber Foundation.

== Journalism ==
In 2016, Mindich became a frequent Huffington Post journalist creating a series of interviews under the title YOU CAN DO SOMETHING ABOUT IT. Interviews included men and women who are leaders, activists and influencers on the subject of gun violence in America.
