= One Mitzvah for Bondi =

Mitzvah campaign in response to the Bondi Beach shooting

One Mitzvah for Bondi is an official campaign launched by the government of New South Wales in Australia that encourages residents of the state and the nation as a whole to perform acts of kindness in honor of the victims of the 2025 Bondi Beach shooting, which occurred in Sydney, the capital city of the state. The effort is based on the distinctly Jewish concept of performing a mitzvah, an act of kindness or charity, in response to tragedy. The initiative operates with the support of the government of New South Wales and of religious and political leaders at the state and national level, and was developed under the auspices of the state's Faith Affairs Council.

== Development ==
In the days after the Islamic State-inspired terrorist attack in December 2025, in which 15 people were murdered during a celebration of the Jewish holiday of Hanukkah organized by Chabad and attended by approximately 1,000 people at Bondi Beach, efforts were made to craft a response that would honour the victims through positive action, rather than through the traditional approaches that include statements of condolence or heightened security measures. Led by Steve Kamper, the Minister for Multiculturalism, an emergency meeting of the New South Wales Faith Affairs Council was held. At the meeting, religious leaders sought to craft a response to the incident, where they were told by leaders of the Jewish community that, in addition to the "unambiguous support" from the community at large, they were seeking to have people perform one mitzvah as part of an effort "to bring some light into the world".

Rabbi Nochum Schapiro proposed that the ultimate response to an act of such hatred was through acts of kindness, one person at a time. The choice to use the Hebrew word mitzvah was described as a deliberate choice of Minister Kamper as a way to spread the request from the Jewish community. Michael Stead, Anglican bishop of South Sydney and the committee's chair, thanked the leaders of the Jewish community for their input in developing the effort to spread the "love and compassion" that is shared across religious groups.

== Announcement ==
On 21 December, the last night of Hanukkah, more than 20,000 people attended a memorial event at Bondi Beach for the victims, at which a national moment of silence was held and the traditional menorah was lit with all eight candles. Chris Minns, the Premier of New South Wales, informed the assembled crowd about the "One Mitzvah for Bondi" project, citing the spirit of the slain Chabad rabbi Eli Schlanger. Minns had spoken to rabbis who were consistent in expressing their belief that this approach was the ideal way to help the nation heal, saying that "if hatred spreads through words and actions, then so does goodness," citing the message of Hanukkah "that darkness cannot extinguish the light".

Rabbi Mendy Kotlarsky of Chabad International emphasised that "our response is more light", and that he was encouraging people to create "more light" through positive actions, saying "we are not going to say never again, we are going to do never again." Australian Prime Minister Anthony Albanese supported the effort as a way to "bring light into the world".

A portal on the official website of the state of New South Wales asks people of "all faiths and all communities" to commit to describe the good deed that they plan to perform, seeking to "create a powerful wave of goodwill" through the collective efforts of individuals in an effort to "help unite our state".

In January 2026, the campaign was incorporated into the Australian Government's observance of the national day of mourning for victims of the Bondi Beach attack. For the commemoration on 22 January, the government encouraged members of the public to undertake one or more of 15 suggested "Mitzvah for Bondi", corresponding to the 15 people killed in the attack. ABC News reported that the Prime Minister's office had put forward the 15 suggestions, which included charitable giving, visiting the sick, helping older relatives, hospitality, family time, prayer and teaching children. The government's guidance also stated that the Chabad community in Bondi had selected the theme for the day and that a memorial event organised by Chabad of Bondi would be recognised as a national event.

== Responses ==
Anthony Fisher, the Catholic Archbishop of Sydney spoke in support, saying "let us bring the light of charity into the darkness" as Christmas approaches. In a statement, the Australian Council of Social Service encouraged Australians to show their support through participation in the program as way to "show that love will always triumph over hate."
