= Bondi Beach shooting =

Terrorist attack in Sydney, Australia

- The two gunmen at the Campbell Parade footbridge. The man on the left is shooting towards Archer Park.
- Location of the shooting in Sydney
- Location: 33°53′22″S 151°16′42″E; Archer Park, Bondi Beach, Sydney, New South Wales, Australia
- Date: 14 December 2025; 11 months ago 18:42–18:48 (AEDT, UTC+11:00)
- Target: Jewish people at a Hanukkah event
- Attack type: Mass shooting and attempted bombing
- Weapons: Beretta rifle; Two single-barrel shotguns; Four assorted homemade bombs (failed to detonate)
- Deaths: 16 (including one attacker)
- Injuries: 41 (including the accused)
- Perpetrators: Sajid Akram and Naveed Akram (alleged)
- Defenders: New South Wales Police; Boris and Sofia Gurman; Ahmed al-Ahmed; Gefen Bitton; Reuven Morrison; Unnamed Iranian refugee
- Motive: Islamic State ideology; Antisemitism
- Accused: Naveed Akram
- Charges: 78 counts: Murder (15 counts); Attempted murder (40 counts); Committing a terrorist act; Discharging firearm to cause grievous bodily harm; Public display of prohibited terrorist symbol (flag of the Islamic State); Placing explosive with intent to cause harm; Shooting at with intent to murder (10 counts); Discharging a firearm with intent to resist arrest (6 counts); Causing wounding or grievous bodily harm with intent to murder (3 counts)

On 14 December 2025, an antisemitic and Islamic State (IS)–inspired terrorist attack occurred at the Archer Park area of Bondi Beach in Sydney, New South Wales, Australia, during a celebration of the Jewish holiday of Hanukkah attended by around 1,000 people. Sajid Akram and his son, Naveed Akram, allegedly shot dead 15 people, aged between 10 and 87, and injured 40 others, including two police officers. IS later claimed credit for the attack.

Over the course of the attack, six civilians confronted and attempted to stop the gunmen. Three were killed and two suffered gunshot wounds. Surf lifesavers and other first responders rushed to the scene to provide first aid during the active shooting. Members of the New South Wales Police Force shot the two alleged gunmen, killing Sajid and critically injuring Naveed, who is now on remand in Goulburn Correctional Centre awaiting trial for 15 murders and 63 other offences.

The Australian prime minister, Anthony Albanese, said the shooting was "deliberately targeted at the Jewish community on the first day of Chanukah". The ongoing investigation by federal and New South Wales police forces is named "Operation Arques". A federal royal commission will examine the circumstances surrounding the attack.

The Bondi shooting is the first fatal attack on Jews in Australia, the worst terrorist attack in Australia, and the deadliest mass shooting in Australia since the 1996 Port Arthur massacre in which 35 people were killed. Mass casualty attacks are uncommon in Australia; the country enacted strict gun laws in response to the Port Arthur massacre. Following the Bondi Beach shooting, the National Cabinet unanimously agreed to further restrict gun laws and introduce a gun buyback program. The attack led to changes to federal hate speech laws and was marked by a national day of reflection and a national day of mourning. In New South Wales, the attack led to changes to terrorism and protest laws.

== Background ==
=== Religious and racial intolerance in Australia ===
The December 2025 attack in Bondi was the first deadly attack targeting Jews in Australia. Prior to this incident, the Australian Jewish community experienced an increase in antisemitic attacks on Jewish individuals and institutions since the beginning of the Gaza war in October 2023. The shooting targeted an annual community Hanukkah celebration organised by Chabad named "Chanukah by the Sea". (Note: There are multiple ways to transliterate the Hebrew name of the holiday; "Hanukkah" is currently the most common spelling by English-speakers, with "Chanukah" being a more traditional spelling. See Hanukkah § Alternative spellings for more details.) The event was held at Archer Park just east of the Bondi Pavilion, with around 1,000 people in attendance.

=== Islamic State ===
In the 2010s, around 500 Australians who supported the self-declared Islamic State (IS) terrorist group (Note: During this period, IS was most commonly known as ISIS.) attempted to migrate to, or succeeded in migrating to, its territory in Iraq and Syria. Many of those who migrated were killed in combat, but dozens of survivors remain in camps guarded by Kurdish forces in Rojava in Syria.

Beginning in 2014, IS directed its supporters around the world to commit "lone wolf" attacks. Since then, there have been other Islamic State–inspired lone wolf attacks, often on Jewish or Christian festivals. However, Islamic State has not historically focused on the Palestine conflict with Israel.

=== Violence and terrorism in Australia ===
Mass casualty terrorism is rare in Australia. The Bondi Beach shooting is the worst terrorist attack committed in Australia. According to the Combating Terrorism Center (CTC), prior to the Bondi Beach shooting, there had been eleven successful jihadi attacks in Australia since the start of the 21st century, resulting in a total of seven fatalities excluding perpetrators and each of which resulted in no more than two people being killed. In addition, the CTC found 22 foiled jihadi plots during the same time period. The CTC attributed these numbers to "a combination of good fortune, gun control measures, and effective counterterrorism (including the extensive use of travel restrictions to prevent local jihadis from gaining training experience abroad)".

In August 2024, the Australian Security Intelligence Organisation (ASIO) raised Australia's national terrorism threat level from "possible" to "probable", citing the risk of community tensions and political violence related to the Gaza war as one of the reasons for doing so.

About a month before the attack, Mossad warned Australian intelligence about possible attacks from the Islamic Republic of Iran. The Australian Financial Review said Mossad was helping ASIO.

The Bondi Beach shooting was the deadliest mass shooting in Australia since the 1996 Port Arthur massacre. Australia's strict gun laws – including restrictions on automatic, semi-automatic, and pump-action rifles, as well as shotguns – were introduced after 35 people were killed in that shooting. Despite this, the number of firearms in Australia, and the number of people licensed to own them, has increased, and hit "a record high" before the shootings. In New South Wales, where the Bondi Beach shooting took place, there were 260,000 gun licences in 2025, up from 181,000 in 2001.

== Attack ==
External videos
- Drone footage showing one gunman neutralised and the other continuing to fire his weapon
- Beachgoers fleeing en masse
- Compilation by Euronews of the gunmen firing their weapons

1 Footbridge
2 Archer Park
3 Bondi Pavilion
4 Bondi Beach

During the start of the attack, Boris and Sofia Gurman, a Russian-Jewish Australian couple in their 60s, noticed an Islamic State flag displayed on a parked vehicle. One gunman was already firing his weapon on the footbridge, while another exited the vehicle, at which point the Gurmans struggled with him, seizing his gun. The second gunman then retrieved another rifle, and one or both of the attackers shot them. The couple, married for 34 years, died there in each other's arms.

Police allege that Sajid and Naveed Akram, a father and son, threw three pipe bombs and a tennis ball bomb into the crowd from a footbridge arching over the carpark to the north of the Bondi Pavilion, all of which failed to detonate. After throwing the bombs, they began shooting into the crowd. Videos of the attack showed two men dressed in black tops firing on the crowd from the footbridge, reportedly with a straight-pull bolt-action rifle and a shotgun. A nearly continuous 11-minute video, recorded by a bystander and beginning shortly after the gunmen opened fire, filmed the attackers from the street side of the footbridge approximately 50 metres (160 ft) away. The video includes the final moments of the shooting, including the first police officer stepping onto the footbridge to apprehend the gunmen, as well as treatment of the wounded.

The gunmen fired repeatedly at Archer Park, shooting several attendees and trapping dozens of others within the fencing bordering the festival. The younger gunman paused and appeared to wave away bystanders approaching him from directions other than that of the Hanukkah celebration, before resuming fire at the Jewish gathering. During the attack, bystander footage filmed Reuven Morrison, an Orthodox Jew in his 60s attending the Chabad festivities, confronting one of the attackers by throwing rocks or bricks, the only weapon he had. He was running directly at them, and acted in an apparent attempt to draw the gunfire away from others.

As one of the attackers left the footbridge and walked towards the festival, he was disarmed by Ahmed al-Ahmed, an unarmed 43-year-old Syrian Australian Muslim and father of two. Al-Ahmed approached him by crouching between two parked cars. He then tackled the gunman from behind, seized the weapon, and turned it toward him before propping the weapon against a tree. Al-Ahmed was accompanied by Gefen Bitton, an Israeli citizen living in Australia who ran back towards the gunfire after seeing al-Ahmed confronting the attacker.

After the first gunman was disarmed, the second gunman reacted by briefly leaving the footbridge and firing three shots towards al-Ahmed and Bitton, injuring the latter. The disarmed gunman retreated to the footbridge; as he did, the aforementioned Morrison charged at him and threw a brick at him. Upon returning to the bridge, the disarmed gunman retrieved another weapon. At that point, al-Ahmed was shot twice and wounded, and Morrison was killed.

Several police officers responded to the scene and used their pistols to shoot at the gunmen from both sides of the footbridge. A detective, using a tree as cover approximately 40 metres (130 ft) away, fired on the gunmen from behind, killing one of them with a fatal shot to the head. The second gunman was shot twice in the stomach and wounded, apparently by the detective and a female officer. Another Muslim bystander, a refugee from Iran, also rushed to help. However, he has remained anonymous in the media; the ABC referred to him as "AB". AB approached the bridge, intending to disarm one gunman, unaware that there were two. He reached the bridge soon after the Akrams were shot, but he managed to kick the gun away from Naveed, who was still alive. Then police fired on AB as well as the gunmen, and AB was nearly shot. In March 2026, the ABC reported that the Australian Government was trying to deport AB to Nauru, due to drug and assault convictions, that his immigration lawyer says are related to untreated trauma from his experiences in Iran. The attack had lasted for six minutes from 18:42 to 18:48.

According to The Guardian, the first thing police did when they reached the footbridge was give CPR to Naveed. The wounded Naveed was apprehended by police and rushed to hospital in critical condition. According to the ABC, the gunmen fired a total of 82 rounds (61 from Naveed and 21 from Sajid) during the attack, with police firing an additional 26 rounds.

Emergency services were first called to the scene at about 18:45 (AEDT, UTC+11). Police released a statement at 18:57 confirming their response to an ongoing incident. More than 123 ambulance personnel attended the scene.

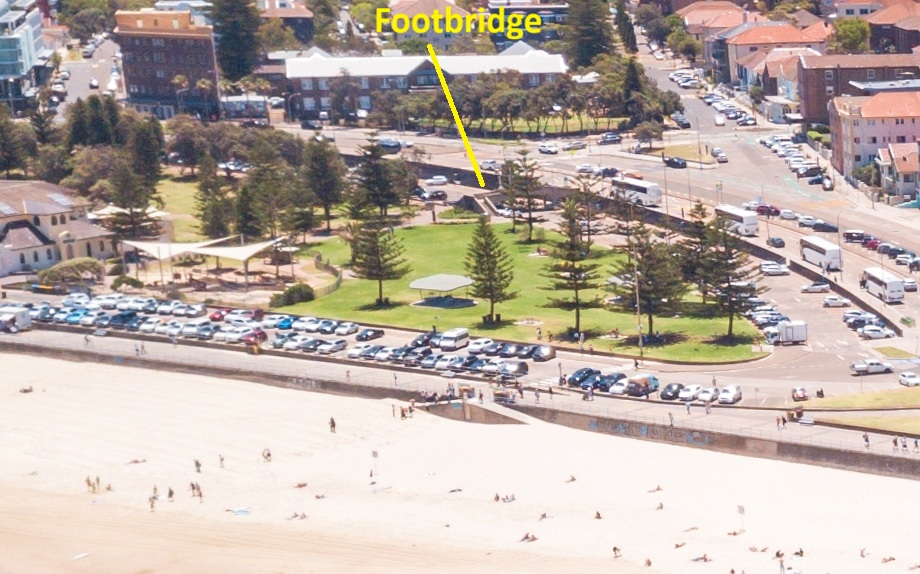
A 2018 aerial view of Bondi Beach proper; Archer Park is in the centre, with the footbridge over the car park to its north. The curving road is Campbell Parade.

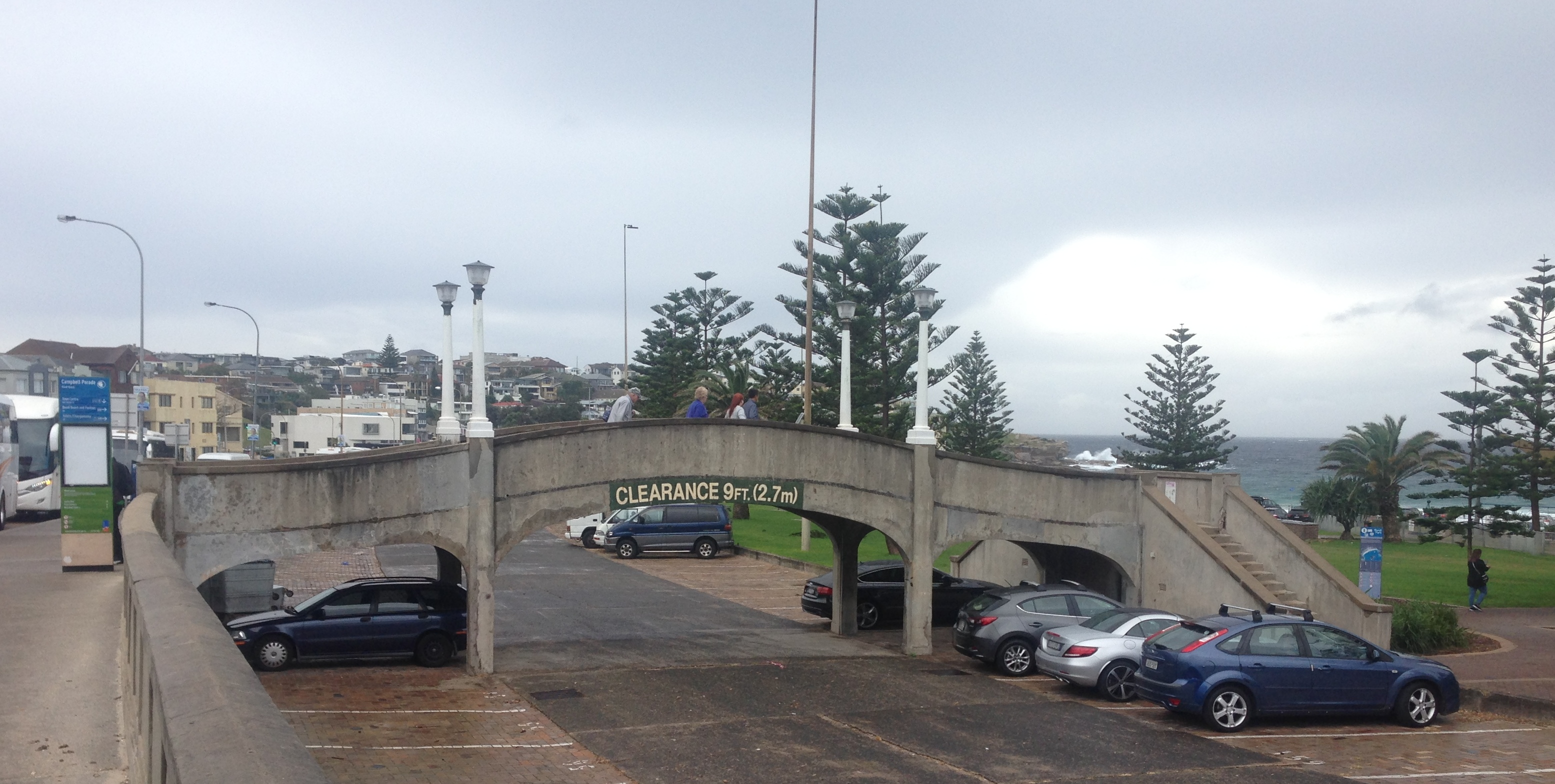
The gunmen mostly fired from this footbridge (2019 photo). The view is from the northwest; Archer Park is in the background.

=== First aid ===
Dozens of on-duty lifesavers, along with many off-duty lifesavers who were present in the area for their clubs' annual Christmas parties, rushed to the aid of victims under fire at the risk to their own lives. They were on the unsecured scene before police and ambulance crews arrived. They used surfboards as stretchers and depleted the club's stock of bandages, as well as giving approximately 250 people shelter inside the club, including a heavily pregnant woman who went into labour during the attack. One lifesaver performed water rescues while the scene was under fire. New South Wales Opposition Leader Kellie Sloane arrived minutes after the attack began and helped provide first aid to victims.

=== Timeline ===
Time	Event	Ref.
5:00 p.m.	"Chanukah by the Sea" event starts.	
6:40 p.m.	The gunmen park their car (a silver 2001 Hyundai Elantra) on Campbell Parade near a footbridge. They are confronted by a couple, who are subsequently killed.	
6:42 p.m.	The gunmen begin firing into the crowd from the footbridge.	
c. 6:43 to 6:45 p.m.	First emergency services calls received by police and ambulance.	
6:47 to 6:49 p.m.	The older gunman walks off the footbridge towards the park. A bystander disarms him. The older gunman walks back to the footbridge and picks up another rifle.	
6:49 to 6:51 p.m.	Police begin firing at the gunmen. Both gunmen are shot and fall to the ground.	
6:57 p.m.	Police release a statement confirming that an incident is being responded to, and urge the public to avoid the area.	
7:08 p.m.	Ambulances arrive at the scene.	
7:14 p.m.	Police release a statement saying they are still responding and urging the public to take shelter.	
7:37 p.m.	Police announce that two people are in custody.	
8:00 p.m.	Police raid the home of the suspects.	
9:36 p.m.	The police commissioner declares a terrorist attack.	
10:13 p.m.	Police disarm bombs in the suspects' car.	

== Casualties ==
Fifteen people were killed in the attack. Thirteen died at the scene and two died shortly after in hospital. Forty people were injured and hospitalised, five of whom required extended hospitalisation into 2026. Additionally, gunman Sajid Akram was killed at the scene by police and the other alleged gunman, Naveed Akram, was injured by police fire and hospitalised.

=== List of victims killed ===
The fifteen victims killed in the shooting were:

- Edith Brutman, 68, vice president of B'nai B'rith NSW anti-prejudice and anti-discrimination committee
- Dan Elkayam, 27, a French national who played for Rockdale Ilinden FC and worked as an IT analyst for NBCUniversal
- Boris, 69, and Sofia Gurman, 61, who disarmed the older gunman on his arrival but were killed with another rifle
- Alex Kleytman, 87, a Holocaust survivor who immigrated to Australia from Ukraine and worked as a civil engineer
- Yaakov Levitan, 39, a South African–born rabbi who was secretary of Sydney Beth Din
- Matilda, (Note: Matilda's family have requested that her last name not be published.) 10, the youngest fatality; a student at La Perouse Public School, born to Ukrainian immigrants
- Peter Meagher, 61, retired police detective and Randwick DRUFC manager who was hired as a freelance photographer at Chanukah by the Sea
- Reuven Morrison, 62, a Soviet-born businessman who threw an object at the older gunman before being killed
- Marika Pogany, 82, a Czechoslovak-born Australian who delivered meals and services to Jewish seniors
- Eli Schlanger, 41, Israeli-Australian dual citizen, assistant rabbi of Chabad and chaplain for Corrective Services NSW
- Adam Smyth, 50, a Bondi local taking a walk with his wife
- Boris Tetleroyd, 68, a Soviet-born singer who was attending the event with his son, who was injured
- Tania Tretiak, 68, a Soviet-born Randwick resident who attended the event with her Jewish husband and granddaughter
- Tibor Weitzen, 78, a Soviet-born automotive engineer who died shielding his wife and Edith Brutman

=== Wounded ===
Without consent, Liverpool Hospital in south Western Sydney changed the name of wounded victim Rosalia Shikhverg to "Karen Jones" and removed the reference to Judaism as her religion in their records while she was a patient there. The story was reported in early January by Nine News, who interviewed the former patient on their Today program. When the interviewer asked if the hospital explained their reasons, she replied, "they said it's for my safety, keep away the media from me, that's what they answer, nothing, nothing else". Then, on 27 January 2026, Sky News Australia interviewed Shikhverg and she told them, "Well, in my opinion, they were afraid of staff, not media… They can't trust their own staff". In a follow-up interview, also with Sky News Australia, Federal Health Minister Mark Butler said about the incident, "We know that Jewish Australians in our health care system have been nervous about antisemitism in health care".

Some of the survivors sought suppression orders to prevent the publication of their names by news media. The suppression orders were first offered in December, shortly after the attack. In April 2026, more survivors took the option to protect their identities.

Eva Geller, a Holocaust survivor, was severely wounded in the attack and never recovered from her injuries. On 5 November 2026, she died at age 90.

== Accused ==
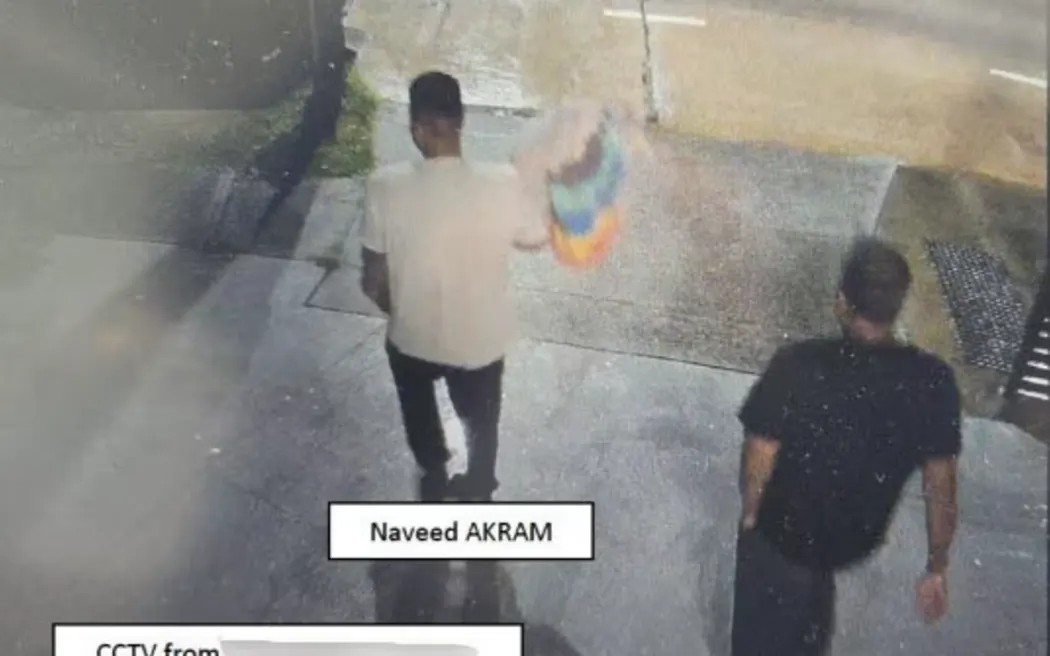
Naveed and Sajid Akram outside their Campsie rental house at about 2 a.m. on 14 December

The alleged shooters were a father and son duo: 50-year-old Sajid (died 14 December 2025) and 24-year-old Naveed Akram (born 12 August 2001). Sajid was a fruit shop owner and Naveed an unemployed bricklayer.

=== Sajid Akram ===
Sajid migrated to Australia in 1998 on a student visa after completing a business degree in Hyderabad, India. According to the Australian home affairs minister, Tony Burke, he transferred to a partner visa in 2001 and later obtained a resident return visa because he was an Australian permanent resident.

Sajid was from an affluent, moderate, Muslim family in Hyderabad. Sajid had no "adverse record" prior to his emigration, and his family in India appeared to be unaware of his "radical mindset or activities". His brother, who lives in Hyderabad, said that his family in India cut ties with him after he married Naveed's mother in 2001. She came from a devoutly religious Catholic family who migrated to Australia from Italy. Associates of Sajid described him as a controlling father and husband, and very secretive. According to Naveed's maternal uncle, Sajid first expressed an interest in obtaining a gun licence in 2010. Sajid was estranged from Naveed's mother at the time of the attack. She has owned the family home in Bonnyrigg since Sajid assigned his share to her in 2024.

Sajid was shot and killed by police at the scene of the attack.

=== Naveed Akram ===
Sajid's son Naveed was born in Australia. He is an Australian citizen.

ASIO examined Naveed's associations beginning in October 2019, though "not in an immediate-threat perspective", as part of an investigation into the leader of Islamic State's Sydney cell, Isaac El Matari. Naveed followed the radical Islamic preacher and spiritual leader of Australia's pro-IS network, William Haddad (known as "Wissam Haddad" and "Abu Ousayd"), who was found to have violated Australia's Racial Discrimination Act in July 2025. Several men linked to Haddad were convicted of terrorism-related offences. In response to a Four Corners investigation in 2026, ASIO defended their 2019 investigation and criticised a former undercover agent the ABC used as a source.

After being shot at the scene, Naveed was hospitalised in critical condition and woke from a coma two days later on 17 December. He is being held on remand in Goulburn Supermax, having been charged with 59 offences, including 15 murders.

== Investigations ==
On the night of the attack, the New South Wales police commissioner, Mal Lanyon, declared the attack a terrorist incident. The investigation was named Operation Arques. Following the incident, Operation Shelter, a NSW Police operation aimed at preventing antisemitic and other hate-related attacks, was expanded with additional personnel, resources and operational support deployed to boost surveillance and increase police presence across Sydney. The same night, police raided a property in Bonnyrigg where the suspects had lived. Three people were taken into custody but released without charge shortly after. Police also raided an Airbnb house in Campsie where the suspects were believed to have been staying prior to the attack. The Sydney Morning Herald reported that the pair had told a family member they were going on a fishing trip.

Albanese and NSW Police stated the attack was motivated by antisemitism and Islamic State ideology.

On 22 December, further details of the attack were released following the lifting of a court suppression order. Screenshots from a video located on Naveed's phone were also released, showing him and Sajid allegedly conducting firearms training in October 2025 in a rural location. Another video, also located on Naveed's phone filmed in October, allegedly showed him and Sajid sitting in front of an image of an IS flag in which the two made statements "condemning the acts of 'Zionists'". On 30 December, Barrett said, "There is no evidence to suggest these alleged offenders were part of a broader terrorist cell or were directed by others to carry out an attack".

Sajid's family in Hyderabad were questioned by Indian authorities.

=== Weapons ===
Sajid had a firearms licence, was the registered owner of six guns, and was a member of a shooting club, Zastava Hunting Association. Naveed trained at the same shooting club. During 2025, the pair made a series of trips to a rural property west of Sydney, ostensibly to shoot foxes that were attacking the property owner's livestock. However, they spent their time shooting at cardboard targets.

Three firearms were used during the attack, and a fourth was located at the scene. Court documents said the weapons they loaded into their vehicle before driving towards Bondi included "two single-barrel shotguns, a Beretta rifle, [and] four home-made improvised explosive devices". Firearms experts believe that the attackers used a Beretta BRX1 straight-pull rifle and two Stoeger M3000 M3K 12-gauge straight-pull shotguns. Firearms such as these have been imported to Australia to bypass restrictions on pump actions, and their rate of fire is comparable to the banned weapons.

After the shooting, police located a large, box-like homemade bomb in the boot of the suspects' vehicle.

=== Islamic State influence ===
The Akrams were inspired by IS ideology, and the attack fits the profile of lone actor terrorism, a tactic sanctioned by IS since 2014. Reportedly, both gunmen had pledged allegiance to IS, and police found two IS flags in their car. According to police reports, documents prove that the gunmen planned the attack months ahead.

=== Travel to the Philippines ===
Australian police investigated a trip the two suspects made to the Philippines a month before the attack. According to Filipino officials, the men travelled to Davao City, on the island of Mindanao, where an Islamic State insurgency is ongoing. According to local police and staff, they spent 1–28 November in Davao City, rarely leaving their hotel room, only for an hour or so at a time, and received no visitors. According to hotel staff, they initially booked a 7-day stay but repeatedly extended it.

According to the Philippine National Police and Australian authorities, there is no evidence that they undertook training for their attacks or were part of a terrorist cell. The Mindanao Development Authority (MinDA) refuted media reports which characterized Mindanao as a "terror hotspot".

== Criminal proceedings ==
On 17 December, police charged Naveed Akram with 59 offences, including 15 counts of murder, 40 counts of attempted murder and one count each of committing a terrorist act, discharging a firearm to cause grievous bodily harm, public display of prohibited terrorist symbols, and placing an explosive with intent to cause harm. He did not request bail, and his court date was set for 8 April 2026. On 22 December 2025, Naveed was moved from Royal North Shore Hospital to Long Bay Correctional Centre. On 5 January 2026, he was transferred to Goulburn Correctional Centre, a supermax prison.

On 16 February, Naveed appeared by video link for a court status mention hearing. He said little, only acknowledging that he had heard what was said in court. On 9 March, Naveed sought a court order to prevent publication of details about his mother, brother and sister, including their names, addresses and workplaces. The application was declined on 2 April 2026. On 10 June, Naveed was charged with 19 additional offences, including 10 counts of shooting at with intent to murder, six counts of discharging a firearm with intent to resist arrest, and three counts of causing wounding or grievous bodily harm with intent to murder. The matter is next listed for hearing on 24 February 2027.

== Analysis ==
Australian National University (ANU) radicalisation expert Clarke Jones said that it is unusual for a father and son to attack together, he said that in all the cases he had seen, "families are the protective factors, the ones who minimise the chances of a young person going out and doing crazy stuff". However, Levi West, an ANU expert in countering violent extremism, said "If the two are on board, they are driving each other." Associates and experts who spoke to the ABC's Background Briefing said that Sajid might have radicalised his son.

== Aftermath ==
After national blood donation service Lifeblood appealed for blood donations, the Lifeblood website promptly crashed due to a surge in traffic, and the national record for donations in 24 hours was broken, reaching 7,180 on 15 December. Over the next week, over 50,000 donated, and over 120,000 appointments were made.

=== Impact on the Jewish community ===
Following the shooting, the Queensland Police Service increased their security presence at Jewish places of worship. Across Australia and New Zealand, Jewish events were cancelled due to the security risks from terror threats, after already having had to cancel many public events in recent years due to the high risk of attacks. In other areas of Sydney, Jewish synagogues, schools, and similar sites were closed on 15 December. Victorian premier Jacinta Allan increased funding for security personnel for Jewish spaces.

In the wake of the attack, major cities across the world increased police presence and security measures at Jewish institutions and public Hanukkah events. In the United Kingdom, authorities cited the Bondi Beach attack as a factor in increasing enforcement against potentially violent protest behavior, alongside the Manchester synagogue attack that took place on the Jewish holiday of Yom Kippur on 2 October 2025. On 17 December 2025, police forces in London and Greater Manchester announced that individuals chanting "globalise the intifada" at protests would be arrested, describing the action as necessary because "violent acts have taken place, the context has changed, words have meaning and consequence".

Threats against the Jewish community in Australia and antisemitic harassment continued in the weeks following the shooting. A man in Perth was arrested on 23 December 2025 for expressing support for the attack. Police in Perth discovered six rifles, thousands of rounds of ammunition, and Hezbollah and Hamas flags in the man's home. A police employee in Queensland was charged on 5 January 2026 with antisemitic online posts and comments related to the Bondi shooting.

=== Anti-Muslim backlash ===
The Bondi shooting exacerbated older ethnic and religious tensions in the community. In the immediate aftermath of the attack, there was a threat of escalating violence with incitement circulated online focused on Cronulla, another beach in Sydney, that was the epicentre of an anti-Arab and anti-Muslim race riot in 2005. The targets of the calls for violent retaliation were the "Middle Eastern" and broader locally described "wog" ethnic groups – Lebanese Australians and other Eastern Mediterranean ethnic groups – who were the target of the previous mob violence. The previous race riots, 20 years earlier, were triggered by local violent crimes committed by individual Lebanese Australian men in Sydney, in the context of tensions already heightened by terrorist attacks in Bali in 2002 targeting Australian tourists, and the September 11 attacks in 2001. A 20-year-old man appeared in court on charges of "using a carriage service to menace, harass, offend, and publicly threaten violence on grounds of race or religion", for attempting to incite retaliatory mob violence in response to the Bondi shooting. The magistrate said he appeared to be a "Muslim hater", and denied bail. NSW police prohibited all public assemblies across the entire Sydney metro area for 14 days.

Two weeks after the attack, the Australian National Imams Council reported a tripling of hostile acts towards Australian Muslims and Islamic institutions, including vandalism, online abuse, and physical intimidation, in particular towards women wearing hijabs. Some groups started taking security measures, with members of one mosque sleeping in it overnight to protect the building against vandalism. In a statement on the UN International Day to Combat Islamophobia, 16 March 2026, Australia's Special Envoy to Combat Islamophobia, Aftab Malik, said that reports of Islamophobic incidents increased eightfold across the country since the Bondi attack.

=== Policy changes and proposals ===
On the day following the shooting, the National Cabinet, which consists of the leaders of Australia's state and territory governments and the prime minister, unanimously agreed to strengthen gun laws. Proposals brought forward during the meeting included restricting firearm ownership to Australian citizens only, accelerating the launch of a national firearms register, limiting the number of firearms a single person can own, and further restricting the types of legal weapons. The NSW Parliament was recalled to debate the state's proposed reforms before Christmas. On 19 December, Albanese announced that the federal government will establish a gun buyback program, which will require the state and territory governments to agree to ambitious new gun law reforms. The Albanese government intends to introduce legislation into parliament to fund the buyback scheme, under a 50:50 cost-sharing arrangement between Australia's federal government and its state and territory governments.

On 18 December, the Albanese government responded to a report delivered to the government in July 2025 on antisemitism by the government's special envoy to combat antisemitism, Jillian Segal, saying that they would take action on all the report's recommendations. The same day, the Albanese government announced the strengthening of hate speech laws. The Minister for Home Affairs would receive new powers to cancel or reject visas of hate preachers. A taskforce to ensure that the education system counters antisemitism will be set up. Special envoy Segal had previously supported lessons on antisemitism and the Holocaust.

On 24 December, the NSW government passed new legislation – the Terrorism and Other Legislation Amendment Bill 2025 – addressing hate speech, the display of offensive symbols, tightened gun controls, and restricted mass protests following terrorism incidents. Premier Chris Minns stated that the government would take stronger action against what it classifies as hate speech and confirmed plans to have the chant "globalise the intifada" officially designated as hate speech. On 16 April 2026, the New South Wales Court of Appeal unanimously struck down the anti-protest laws, passed on 24 December 2025 as a response to the Bondi mass-shooting. The laws were ruled to be unconstitutional, as they were found to impermissibly burden the implied freedom of political communication.

==== Immigration debates and hate crime laws ====
The attack prompted discussions regarding Australia's immigration framework and gun laws, with some officials questioning the pathways from temporary visas to permanent residency and the criteria for obtaining a firearms licence as a non-citizen permanent resident.

On 12 January 2026, Albanese announced that the Australian Parliament would reconvene on 19 January to introduce fast-tracked hate speech and firearms legislation. The Prime Minister also confirmed that the federal government would seek cross-party support from the Coalition and Australian Greens.

The Bill passed both houses of parliament on 20 January 2026. It passed in the House 116 votes to 7, and 38–22 in the senate and would come into force as the Combatting Antisemitism, Hate and Extremism (Criminal and Migration Laws) Act 2026 the day after receiving royal assent.

=== Royal commission ===
In the days following the attack, the New South Wales government announced that it would hold a state-based royal commission to investigate the rise and prevalence of antisemitism, the police response to the shooting, and gun licensing issues.

On 21 December, Albanese announced an Independent Commonwealth Review into Australia's federal law enforcement and intelligence agencies to be led by retired public servant Dennis Richardson that would deliver a public report on the attack to government by the end of April 2026. On 29 December, the review's terms of reference were released. On 29 December, Albanese said that there were no plans for a federal royal commission, as it would give a platform to antisemitic views and was not the best format for national security issues.

On 8 January, Albanese announced a federal Royal Commission on Antisemitism and Social Cohesion which will examine the circumstances surrounding the attack. Former High Court justice Virginia Bell has been appointed the commissioner. The Richardson review will become part of the commission and he will support its work, with delivery of an interim report by the commission in April. The federal royal commission will replace the proposed state-based New South Wales royal commission. The commissioner is required to deliver her report before the end of 2026.

== Reactions to the attack ==
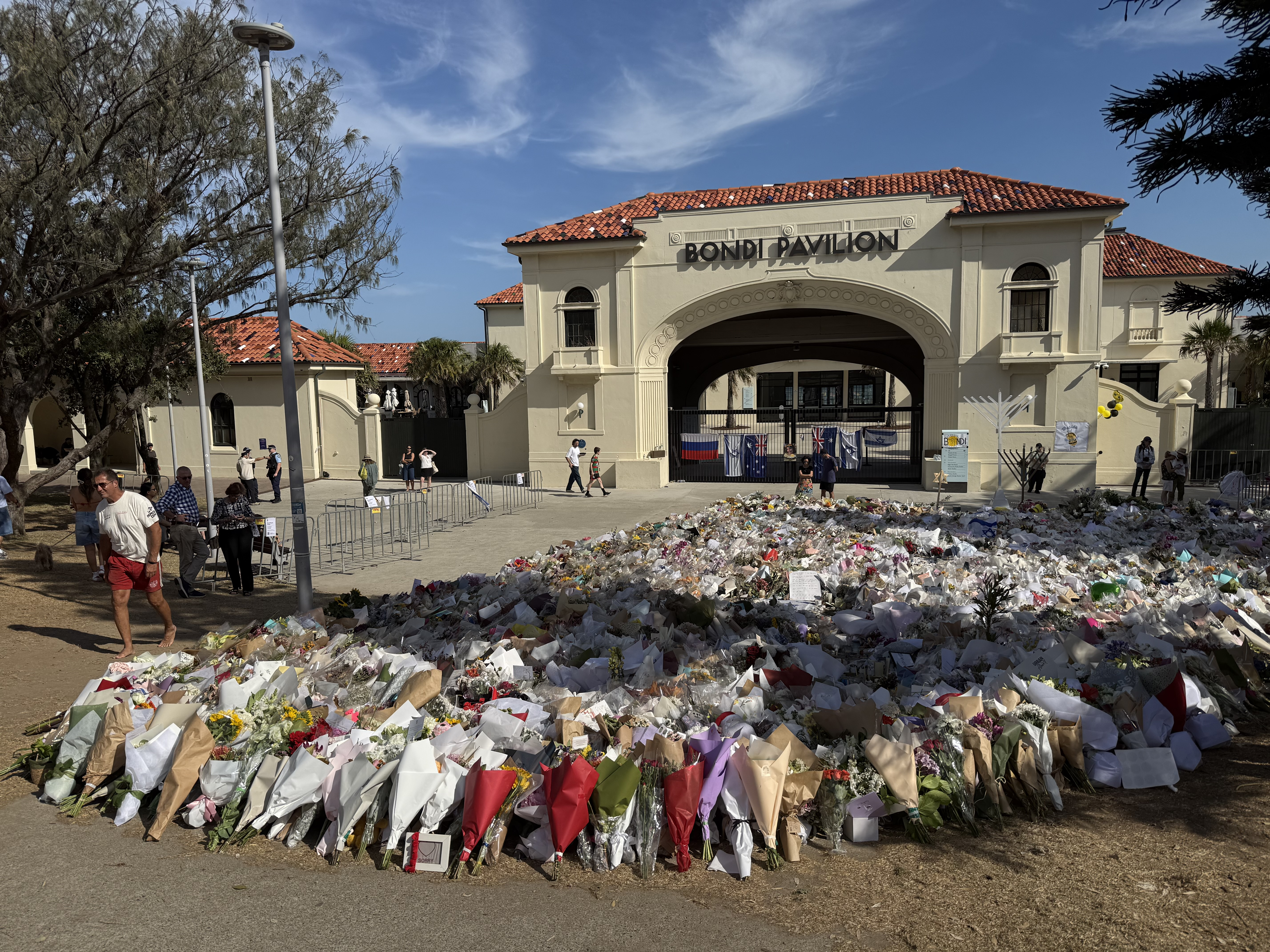
Large floral memorial at the Bondi Pavilion

Organisations such as the DPMC, SBS News, ABC News, The Ethics Centre, and The Guardian have referred to the attack as the Bondi massacre.

=== Tributes ===
On the second day of Hanukkah, the Sydney Opera House was lit with an image of candles on the Menorah. The decision to do this was an initiative of NSW Premier Chris Minns.

At the third Ashes test in Adelaide on 17 December, a three-minute silence was observed before the start of play, while both the Australian and English teams wore black armbands in memory of the victims of the shooting. A second tribute was held at the opening of the fifth Ashes test in Sydney on 4 January 2026 to honour victims and first responders.

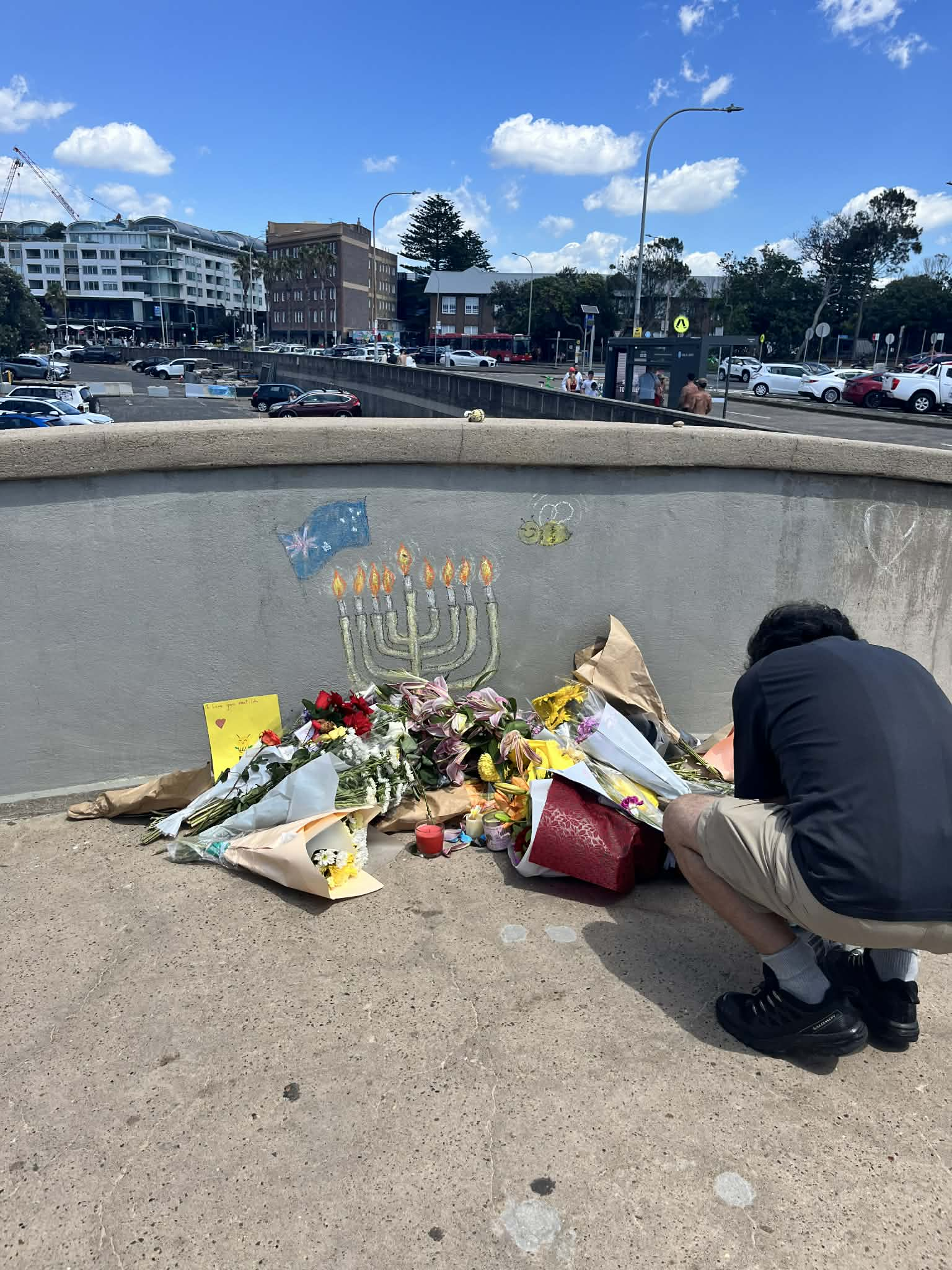
Person paying tribute at the footbridge where the shooters fired

Led by Steve Kamper, the Minister for Multiculturalism, an emergency meeting of the New South Wales Faith Affairs Council was held on 19 December, at which the campaign One Mitzvah for Bondi was established. Minns announced the project at a vigil at Bondi Beach on 21 December, the eighth night of Hanukkah, citing the lesson of the holiday: "that darkness cannot extinguish the light". The effort encourages individuals to perform a mitzvah, an act of kindness or charity.

On 21 December, a nationwide minute of silence was held in Australia as part of a national day of reflection over the shooting.

The 2025 Sydney New Year's Eve fireworks event included a minute's silence at 11pm and the projection of a menorah onto the pylons. The original plan was for a dove with the word "Peace" but after criticism from the Jewish community, the decision was made to feature a Jewish-specific symbol.

On 22 January 2026, Australia observed a national day of mourning.

On the Jewish holiday of Tu BiShvat, in early February 2026, the Jewish community planted trees in honour of those killed in the attack.

In the wake of the incident, the Sydney Jewish Museum worked to preserve artifacts from the massacre, including rescue boards used as stretchers for victims, flowers and plush toys placed at the site to memorialise the tragedy, and recordings of eyewitness testimonies. Saying that the incident was "not history yet", the museum's senior curator said that the effort to gather and display the items was intended to provide a measure of "comfort that can be found in knowing that these stories are going to be preserved".

=== Support for bystanders who intervened ===
External videos
- Dashcam captures Boris and Sofia Gurman struggle with one of the gunmen
- Ahmed al-Ahmed tackles one of the gunmen

Many of the responses included praise for Syrian-born Ahmed al-Ahmed, one of the bystanders who intervened to disarm one of the attackers, praising his bravery. United States president Donald Trump praised a man who intervened, saying "it's been a very, very brave person who went and attacked frontally one of the shooters and saved a lot of lives." King Charles' 2025 Christmas message paid tribute to "the ways in which individuals and communities display spontaneous bravery, instinctively placing themselves in harm's way to defend others", such as those at Bondi. Eva Corlett, The Guardian's correspondent from Wellington New Zealand, wrote that many global headlines covering the shooting centred on the intervention from bystander al-Ahmed. Jonathan Sacerdoti wrote in The Jewish Chronicle that British news media emphasised the heroism of al-Ahmed while editorially sidelining the fact that Jews were killed in an act of antisemitic terror.

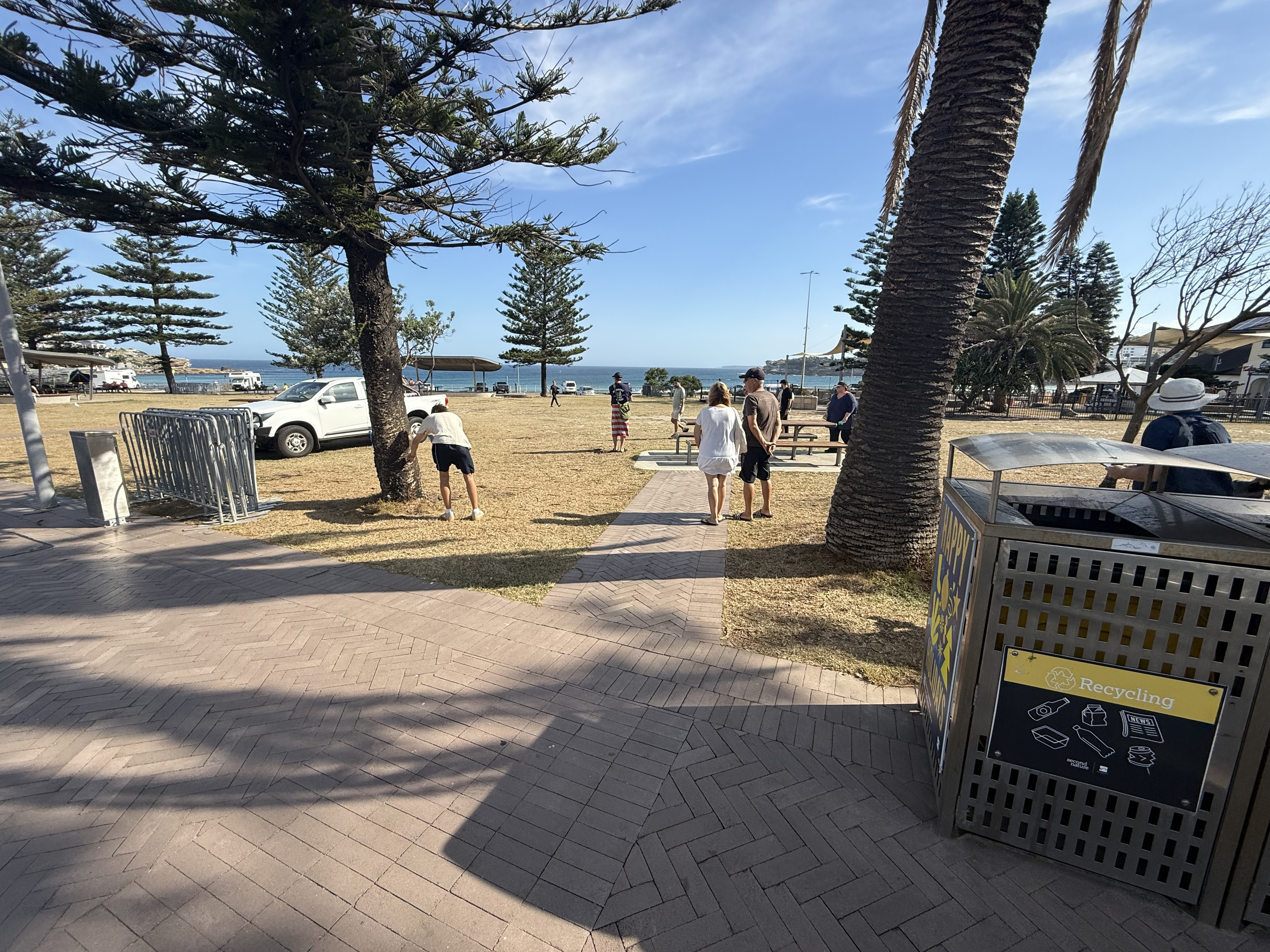
The spot where Ahmed al-Ahmed disarmed Sajid

Israeli prime minister Benjamin Netanyahu praised al-Ahmed without naming him: "We saw an action of a brave man – turns out a Muslim brave man, and I salute him – that stopped one of these terrorists from killing innocent Jews". In earlier remarks, Netanyahu praised an unnamed Jewish man, describing a video he saw. The Sydney Morning Herald reported that Netanyahu "initially got it wrong" by telling journalists that it was a Jewish bystander who wrestled the gun away. Boris Gurman, a Jewish man, was videoed tackling and temporarily disarming Sajid during the beginning of the attack, before al-Ahmed was videoed tackling and temporarily disarming Sajid.

Two days after the attack, Albanese visited al-Ahmed in hospital. On 18 December, al-Ahmed received A$2.5 million in donations from GoFundMe, with the largest donation coming from Jewish-American billionaire Bill Ackman, who donated A$99,999.

=== Responses from Australian political leaders ===
Australian prime minister Anthony Albanese described the shooting as "shocking and distressing" and called it "deliberately targeted at the Jewish community on the first day of Chanukah" and "an act of pure evil, an act of antisemitism and terrorism on our shores". He later said that more could have been done to prevent the attack, and that he accepts his share of responsibility as the prime minister. The minister for home affairs, Tony Burke, called the shooting an "appalling act of violence". The Premier of New South Wales, Chris Minns, said "the reports and images coming out of Bondi tonight are deeply distressing" and encouraged people to follow the directions of police.

Australian opposition leader Sussan Ley delayed the release of the Coalition's new migration policy, citing concerns about fraying social cohesion and the risk that a fresh debate on migration levels would be inflammatory during "an extremely sensitive time". Instead of pursuing the migration debate, Ley shifted the Coalition's focus to national security and counterterrorism, calling for the immediate formation of an antisemitism and counter-terrorism taskforce. Ley caused controversy and confusion by stating that the Royal Commission "must include reference to radical Islamic extremism, as well as far-left (pause) neo-Nazi extremism". When asked if she meant that Nazis were left wing, she said, "Far left and neo-Nazi extremism were the words that I used. Yes."

=== Responses from Australian Jewish organisations ===
Various Australian Jewish organisations had differing responses. The Executive Council of Australian Jewry issued a statement saying: "The time for talking is over. We need decisive leadership and action now to eradicate the scourge of antisemitism from Australia's public life, for which the Jewish community has long been advocating ... The shooting attack targeted the Jewish community but it took place at Bondi Beach, the people's beach, on what should have been a carefree summer's day. It was an attack on all Australians, our freedoms and our way of life." The CEO of the conservative Australian Jewish Association, Robert Gregory, said: "This is an attack on the Jewish community that deeply pains us as a community". The president of the Zionist Federation of Australia, Jeremy Leibler, said: "An attack on Jews celebrating their faith is an attack on Australia itself. It is an assault on our values, our social cohesion, and the basic right of people to gather without fear."

Other organisations issuing statements included the Jewish Communal Appeal, Chabad NSW, Jewish National Fund Australia, Australian Association of Jewish Holocaust Survivors and Descendants, Sydney Jewish Museum, Queensland Jewish Board of Deputies, Anti-Defamation Commission, and The Joint Australia.

Co-founder and executive of the progressive non-Zionist group Jewish Council of Australia (JCA) Max Kaiser called remarks by special envoy Jillian Segal "highly irresponsible", for a statement suggesting that the attack was a logical consequence of pro-Palestinian protests since October 2023. The JCA later published an online petition calling upon the prime minister and all Australian leaders to oppose division hindering the fight against antisemitism.

=== Responses from Australian Islamic organisations ===
The Australian National Imams Council condemned the shooting, saying: "This is a moment for all Australians, including the Australian Muslim community, to stand together in unity, compassion, and solidarity, rejecting violence in all its forms and affirming our shared commitment to social harmony and the safety of all Australians". They issued a statement saying the council stood in solidarity with the Australian Jewish community and "unequivocally condemns ISIS as an evil, dangerous terrorist organisation whose actions and ideology stand in complete opposition to the teachings of Islam and the values upheld by Muslims worldwide". Muslim leaders in Sydney refused to perform funeral rites or receive the deceased gunman's body, condemning the shooting as a "barbaric, criminal, and terrorist act". The Australia Palestine Advocacy Network condemned the attack and said "perpetrators of this horrendous attack do not represent our movement or the values we uphold".

=== International responses ===
==== Israel ====
Prime minister Benjamin Netanyahu spoke about the attack on Sunday 14 December Israeli time (Monday AEDT). Netanyahu delivered a speech from a government meeting at Dimona. Netanyahu attacked prime minister Albanese for failing to prevent the spread of antisemitism in Australia. In what The Times of Israel called "an oblique attack on the Australian government" Netanyahu said, "...We will continue to demand from them to do what is demanded of leaders of free nations. We will not give up, we will not bow our heads, we will continue to fight as our ancestors did".

On 16 December, Amichai Chikli, Israel's Minister of Diaspora Affairs and Combating Antisemitism, made a brief trip to Sydney. He visited the site of the attack and the memorial for the victims, and visited pro-Israel advocate Arsen Ostrovsky in hospital.

Writing in Haaretz, Dana Segall said that progressive reactions to the attack failed to acknowledge and emphasise its antisemitic nature, "dilut[ing] Jewish victimhood into a vague slurry of 'violence,' 'tragedy,' and 'shared humanity'."

===== Isaac Herzog's presidential visit =====
On 9 February 2026, Israeli president Isaac Herzog began an official visit to Australia, arriving in Sydney and laying a wreath at the Bondi Beach memorial site, where he also met survivors and victims' families.

In debates in the Australian Senate before the visit, the Australian Greens said that the president's visit would "inflame community tensions". The Jewish Council of Australia opposed his visit, urging the Australian government to rescind the invitation. According to the Executive Council of Australian Jewry, the visit was intended to "lift the spirits of a pained community", express solidarity with Jewish Australians and recalibrate bilateral ties. His visit was also welcomed by the Zionist Federation of Australia.

United Nations Commissioner Chris Sidoti said the visit should not have happened because Herzog is personally guilty of incitement to genocide, relating to the genocide in Gaza. There were calls for Herzog to be arrested, and discussion about whether this was possible. The visit drew attention to other past actions of Herzog, such as signing bombs that were later dropped in Gaza.

Herzog's visit was met with several protests, including pro-Palestinian demonstrations in Sydney, Melbourne and Brisbane criticising Israel's actions in Gaza and opposing Herzog's presence. Police used pepper spray on protesters and journalists in Sydney.

More than 100 Muslim organisations condemned the actions of NSW Police using disproportionate force against the group of Australian Muslims who were praying near the rally. Aftab Malik, Australia's special envoy to combat Islamophobia, demanded an apology from NSW police for using "excessive and unprovoked" force against a group of Muslim men who conducted impromptu prayers during a protest in Sydney which, according to Minns, was in "the middle of a riot". The independent Law Enforcement Conduct Commission will investigate the conduct of police at the rally.

A demonstration outside parliament house in Canberra was addressed by Greens deputy leader Mehreen Faruqi and joined by independent senator David Pocock.

==== United States ====
US President Donald Trump described the shooting as a "terrible ... antisemitic attack". According to The Jerusalem Post, an American official told Fox News that the US would support Israeli strikes on Iran if the Bondi attack had been ordered by Iran.

==== Islamic State ====
On 18 December, IS called the attack a "source of pride" on its full page editorial in the 18 December 2025 issue of Al-Naba, their Arabic-language propaganda magazine. Reuters and several other media sources in English described the announcement as not claiming responsibility. According to SITE Intelligence, IS has been using the attack as propaganda. Lebanese news quoted the al-Naba editorial as saying, "The Islamic State's official speeches and writings have consistently incited attacks against Jews and Christians during their holidays and gatherings," and the attackers "answered the call and carried out the recommendations to target holidays and gatherings".

In late February 2026, IS spokesperson Abu Hudhayfah al-Ansari claimed credit for the Bondi massacre, calling Sajid and Naveed Akram "soldiers" and "brave lions". Counter terrorism experts commented that it was part of a propaganda strategy to extend its influence and "typical" of them to claim affiliation and that the group sought to inspire "self-directed" terrorism.

==== Elsewhere overseas ====
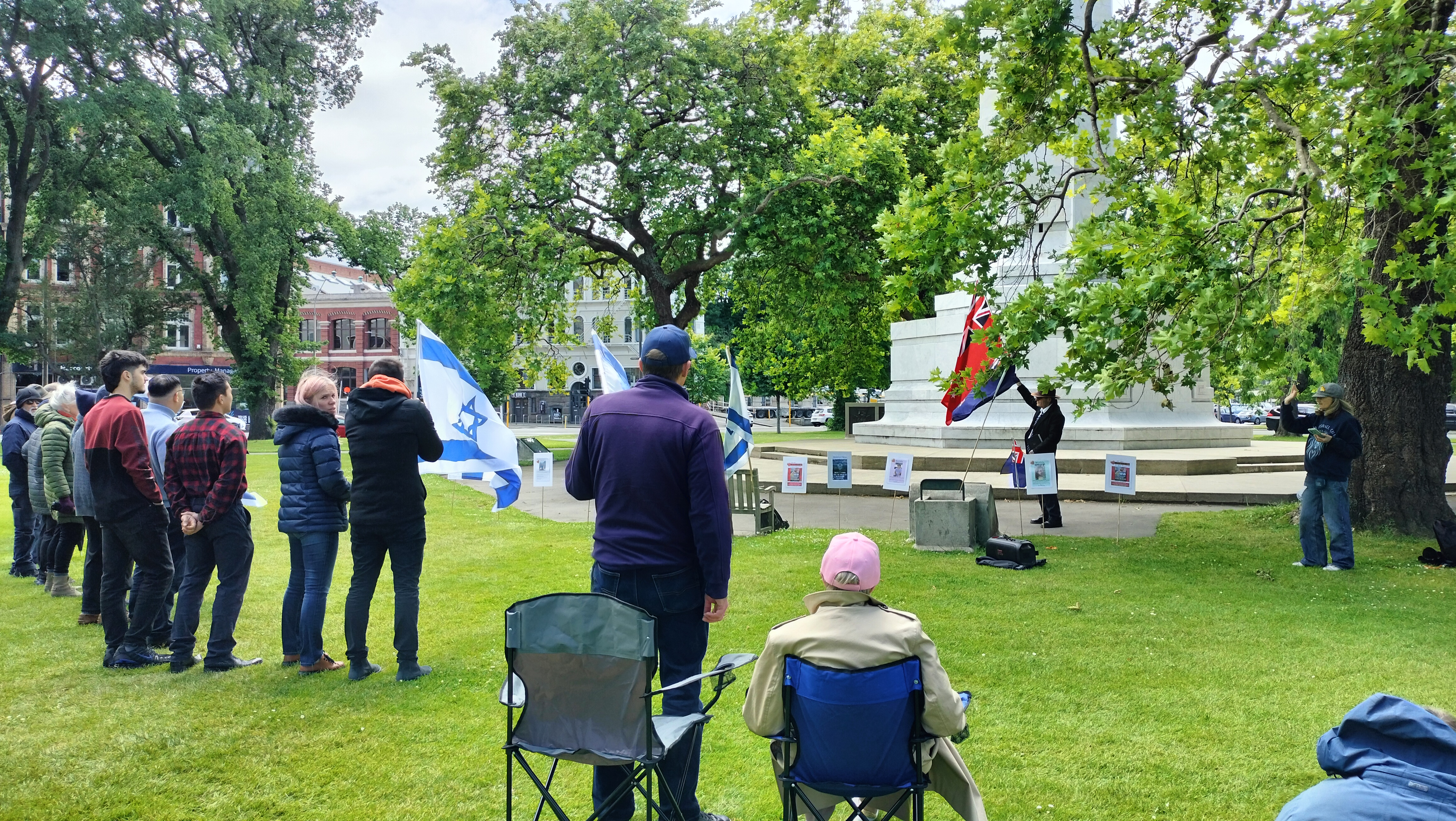
Vigil for victims of the Bondi Beach shooting at the Dunedin Cenotaph in New Zealand

The attack was condemned by the leaders of many other nations, including France, India, Iran, Jordan, Pakistan, the Palestinian Authority, (Note: The authority of the Palestinian government in Ramallah. There is a parallel Palestinian government in Gaza led by Hamas, due to the Fatah–Hamas conflict. Australia recognises only the Ramallah government.) Qatar, Saudi Arabia, Turkey, and the United Arab Emirates. Statements of support for the victims were issued by New Zealand prime minister Christopher Luxon, United Kingdom prime minister Keir Starmer, and King Charles III, Australia's head of state, (Note: Usually represented in Australia by the governor-general.) wrote:

In times of hurt, Australians always rally together in unity and resolve. I know that the spirit of community and love that shines so brightly in Australia – and the light at the heart of the Chanukah Festival – will always triumph over the darkness of such evil.

==== Criticism of Afghanistan and Iran ====
According to Saudi-backed UK-based news agency Iran International, Iranian or Iran-affiliated Tasnim News Agency and Sabereen News (Note: Sabereen News is published in Iraq, but is believed to have ties to Iran's Revolutionary Guard, an opponent of the Islamic State.) appeared to have praised the killings. Iran international also pointed out that "The son of Iran's ex-ambassador to Australia" had posted about Hanukkah on X on 15 December 2015, even though his post made no mention of the attack. Afghanistan International criticised the Taliban for allegedly failing to condemn the attack, but noted that the rest of the Islamic world had, highlighting that officials in Iran, Jordan, Qatar, Saudi Arabia, Turkey, and the United Arab Emirates voiced strong disapproval of the attack.

=== Speculation and accusations ===
==== Recognition of the state of Palestine ====
Australian opposition leader Sussan Ley and other Liberal–National coalition MPs criticised Australia's recognition of Palestine for being linked to the shooting, despite this being directly contrary to the goals of the Islamic State, who aspire to be the only Islamic state and reject nation states as a concept, and have no interest in their local supporters.

Israeli prime minister Benjamin Netanyahu blamed the Albanese government for "pouring fuel on this antisemitic fire" as a result of policies such as the recognition of Palestine at the United Nations General Assembly in September 2025. Albanese rejected the accusations, but later expressed his concern regarding some of the language used during pro-Palestine protests. Netanyahu has been pushing a "Hamas is ISIS" slogan since the 2014 Gaza war.

In an interview with Channel 4 News UK, former Australian prime minister Malcolm Turnbull criticised Israeli Prime minister Benjamin Netanyahu for attributing the attack to Australian recognition of the State of Palestine, pointing out that the vast majority of nations recognise the state, and told "Bibi Netanyahu" to "stay out of our politics". Turnbull's remarks to Channel 4 UK were repeated in multiple other news sources.

==== False flag conspiracy theories ====
Islamic State (Daesh) state media criticised the false flag claims in their Al-Naba newspaper.

Iranian officials condemned the attack. Iran's Mehr News Agency called the attack a "false flag" and blamed Israel for it. IRGC military officer Mohammad Reza Naqdi and Iranian Armed Forces chief Abdolrahim Mousavi were also quoted making false flag accusations. False flag conspiracy theories had broadly become more common over the past five years. The Israeli false flag rumours were also circulating on social media.

There were also false flag conspiracy theories about Iran and the Islamic State.

=== Misinformation ===
Following the attack, various pieces of misinformation were shared online. A website impersonating The Daily Aus, registered the same day as the shooting, launched an article purposely mislabelling bystander Ahmed al-Ahmed.

There were rumours on social media blaming Lebanese people and other Arabs, or claiming the shooters were Pakistani.

Additional posts online falsely claimed one of the alleged shooters had served in the IDF. Arsen Ostrovsky, a human rights attorney, survivor of the 7 October attacks, and employee of the Israeli think-tank Misgav Institute for National Security and Zionist Strategy, moved to Australia on 1 December, and became a victim of diverse online suspicion and even accusation after the shooting.

Jordanian fact checking website Misbar reported that a fabricated statement was circulating on social media. The social media posts contained a fabricated quote "welcoming" the attack, claiming it was from a statement issued by Hamas. Some posts contained the additional false claim that it was translated by Al Jazeera. Misbar found that no genuine statements issued by Hamas referred to the attack.

A fake AI-generated image was posted on the social media website X on 16 December 2025 by a Pakistan-based account going by the username of @RomiAlerts, with the caption claiming that Naveed Akram, one of the alleged assailants in the shooting, had travelled to Manila, Philippines, on an Indian passport before the shooting, and met with Kant Kothari, the defence attaché of India, outside a Jollibee restaurant. The post was fact-checked and debunked as "fake news" by the Australian Associated Press and the Agence France-Presse.

A Pakistani man living in Australia was harassed and threatened online due to having an identical name to one of the attackers. Pakistani officials accused "hostile countries", in particular India, of spreading such misinformation.

Such claims, alongside others, were spread by xAI's chatbot, Grok. Al Jazeera noted social media posts from around the world claiming that Ahmed al-Ahmed, one of the bystanders who intervened, had a completely different name or that he was a Lebanese Maronite Christian or a Jew. Al-Ahmed was later confirmed to be a Muslim, and a naturalised citizen of Australia who had emigrated from Syria.

Various social media personalities and influencers circulated misinformation surrounding the attack. A false story was circulated that Australian Muslims launched fireworks to celebrate the attack.

== Media depictions ==
=== Documentaries ===
- Four Corners produced a two-part special on the attack. Part 1, Bondi: Light Over Darkness, aired on 2 February 2026. Part 2, Bondi: Path to Terror, was aired on 9 February, and investigated the secret lives of the terrorists, uncovering new information about the years leading up to the attack. The report was criticised by the Australian Security Intelligence Organisation for focusing on a former ASIO informant (known pseudonymously as Marcus) as a source. The ABC stood by the report.
- Three-part ABC Radio National documentary: The Road to Bondi
- Bondi: A Timeline of Terror – Sky News Australia (owned by News Corp Australia) announced that it will release its 90-minute documentary of the event on 24 February 2026.

=== Books ===
- In January 2026, Menachem Creditor, an American rabbi, published We Will Prevail: Jewish Responses to Bondi Beach, an anthology of essays, poems and firsthand reflections from around the world. The anthology includes a foreword by a survivor of the attack, Creditor's brother-in-law Arsen Ostrovsky.
- Bondi Terror was published on 11 September 2026 and authored by Alex Ryvchin and journalist Sharri Markson, the book focuses on stories that unfolded during the event and the people involved.
- Ahmed al Ahmed's account, Light Will Win – The Bondi Hero's story of humanity, hope and courage was published in November 2026.

== See also ==
- 2024 Melbourne synagogue attack – arson attack on the Adass Israel Synagogue, in a neighbouring state
- Demographics of Sydney
- List of massacres in Australia
- List of terrorist incidents linked to the Islamic State

== Notes ==
=== Works cited ===
- Eichner, Itamar (14 December 2025). "Netanyahu at government meeting: 'Brave Muslim stopped one of the terrorists in Australia'". Ynet global.
