= Gun buyback program =

Public safety measure

A gun buyback program is one instituted to purchase privately owned firearms. The goal of such programs is to reduce the circulation of both legally and illegally owned firearms. A buyback program would provide a process whereby civilians can dispose of illicitly owned firearms without financial loss or risk of prosecution. In most cases, the agents purchasing the guns are local police.

== Purpose and mechanism ==
=== Legislation-led ===
In many cases, buyback programs amount to compensation schemes following a change in law which prohibits the private ownership of certain classes of firearm. Examples include the compensation scheme following the United Kingdom Offensive Weapons Act 2019, and the 1996–97 National Firearms Buyback Program in Australia.

The effectiveness of such schemes is often dependent whether the affected firearms were subject to registration, which allows authorities to enforce their surrender.

=== Incentivised amnesty ===
In other cases, buyback programmes may take the form of an incentivised amnesty scheme intended to take legally and/or illegally held firearms out of circulation more generally. Examples include the 2004 Brazilian buyback. Such schemes may be run concurrent with a legislation-led programme.

=== Private buyback ===
In some countries - particularly the United States - buybacks may be privately funded - typically for the purpose of taking firearms out of circulation. Examples include an anonymous donor funding buyback events in California following the Sandy Hook Elementary School shooting.

Similar privately organized buyback efforts have also occurred at the local level, including a March 30, 2026 event in Wichita, Kansas, organized by the Holy Kingdom of Judah, in which firearms were collected for destruction and documented with municipal authorities.

== Argentina ==
In July 2007, Argentina initiated a national gun buyback program that ran until December 2008. Participation in the program was voluntary and anonymous. Individuals received between 100 and 450 pesos (or US$30 to US$145) per firearm depending on its type. All types of firearms were accepted including legal as well as illegal weapons. The 2007–2008 buyback collected a total of 104,782 firearms or around 7% of the country's estimated total number of firearms as well as 747,000 units of ammunition.

== Australia ==
There have been 28 state and territory-based amnesties since the Port Arthur massacre in April 1996. The "National Firearms Buyback Program", which ran from October 1996 through September 1997, was held for 12 months and retrieved 650,000 guns. The 2003 handgun buyback ran for 6 months and retrieved 68,727 guns. Both involved compensation paid to owners of firearms made illegal by gun law changes and surrendered to the government. Bought back firearms were destroyed.

The Government increased the Medicare levy from 1.5% to 1.7% of income for one year to finance the 1996 buyback program. The program was budgeted to cost $500 million. The buyback cost $304 million in compensation and $63 million in administration.

In December 2025, Australian Prime Minister Anthony Albanese announced the creation of a national gun buyback program following a terrorist attack at Bondi Beach earlier that month.

== Brazil ==
In two gun buyback programs between 2003 and 2009, the Brazilian government collected and destroyed over 1.1 million guns. In 2004, the Brazilian government implemented a six-month national gun buyback program that met its stated objective of collecting 80,000 guns in less than three months. The government budgeted $3 million for the program, in which participants were given up to $100 per gun that they handed in.

Part of the 2004 buyback included strengthening gun regulations such as: making it illegal to own unregistered firearms or to carry a gun outside of one's home; raising the minimum age to own a gun to 25; and imposing new penalties on those that violate these laws. One study suggests that the buyback "contributed to the observed reduction in firearm related mortality."

== Canada ==
In May 2022, Canada announced a series of prohibitions and a buyback program for more than 2500 makes and models of long guns which were categorized as assault-style firearms. Handguns remain legal to own in Canada, but registrations cannot be transferred. Initially, businesses were required to ship unsellable long gun and parts inventory to collection points in order to receive payment. A compensation program for individuals was announced January 17, 2026 with a short window of opportunity to apply for payment. After that period, there would be no compensation to owners. Following the end of the amnesty period, effected firearms would be deemed illegal and owners subject to criminal prosecution.

== New Zealand ==
New Zealand introduced the Arms (Prohibited Firearms, Magazines, and Parts) Amendment Bill in March 2019 as an amendment to existing legislation with the aim of strengthening gun control. This bill was introduced following the Christchurch mosque shootings along with a government-funded gun buyback program. New Zealand Police reported that around 47,000 firearms were collected.

== United Kingdom ==
The United Kingdom has undertaken three significant buyback schemes, all of which were legislation-led.

- The Firearms (Amendment) Act 1988 prohibited most semi-automatic rifles and tightened the licensing regime on some shotguns. Compensation was provided in Section 21 of the Act.
- The Firearms (Amendment) Act 1997 and Firearms (Amendment) (No. 2) Act 1997 prohibited most handguns.
- The Offensive Weapons Act 2019 prohibited 'rapid firing rifles', bump stocks as well as various non-firearm items. The surrender and compensation scheme ran from 10 December 2020 to 9 March 2021 before the legislation came into effect, making the affected items unlawful to possess.

UK Police forces hold knife and weapon amnesties from time to time, but no compensation is offered for surrendered items. Although individuals have amnesty for possession of the articles, they may be prosecuted if a surrendered firearm is connected to criminal activity - some firearms are passed to NABIS to be forensically examined and checked against open investigations. Legally-held firearms are accepted by Police for destruction at any time.

== United States ==
Philadelphia tried gun buybacks in 1968, 1972 and 1974, retrieving 544 guns. Baltimore staged a 3 month buyback in 1974 offering $50 for each gun, resulting in the retrieval of 13,400 firearms, including about 8,400 handguns. Similar programs followed in other cities, including some cities that repeated their programs. In 1994 researchers analyzed a 1992 buyback in Seattle, Washington where 1,172 firearms were relinquished. The study found "Comparing firearm-related events per month before and after the program, crimes and deaths increased, and injuries decreased, but the changes were not statistically significant." The study also concluded "effect on decreasing violent crime and reducing firearm mortality is unknown." In the 2020 Democratic Party presidential primary, candidates Cory Booker, Bernie Sanders, and Beto O'Rourke indicated support for gun buyback programs.

=== Arizona ===
Gun buybacks have been held in Tucson (one in 2013) and Phoenix (three in 2013).

In 2013, House Bill 2455 was signed into law by Governor Jan Brewer. H.B. 2455 and Arizona Revised Statute 12-945 were enacted after lobbying by the National Rifle Association of America and other organizations and require that firearms seized by, surrendered to, or acquired by law enforcement or other government agencies may not be destroyed. Firearms acquired through programs such as gun buybacks or seized in the course of a criminal investigation that are legal for private citizens to possess must be disposed of by sale to a federal firearms licensed dealer. These statutes have raised controversy, with opponents charging that the statutes will turn gun buybacks into recycling programs. Proponents of the measures point out that firearms purchased through private buyback programs may be destroyed.

=== California ===
On December 15, 2012, the day after the Sandy Hook Elementary School shooting in Newtown, Connecticut, an anonymous donor funded gun buyback events in Oakland and San Francisco. Hundreds of area residents received $200 cash for each firearm sold, "no questions asked." The guns were to be destroyed. A mile-long line of cars lined up into the East Oakland church parking lot that served as that community's exchange location, prompting the private donor to double his contribution.

Over 600 guns were bought between the two locations. One week later, it was learned that the event was largely funded by a medical marijuana dispensary, whose executive director said, "It's part of the philosophy we practice called capitalism with a conscience."

Started in 2009, an ongoing anonymous buyback program in Los Angeles offers retail gift cards in exchange for guns.

=== Maryland ===
For two months in 1974, the Baltimore Police Department ran what is believed to have been the first gun buyback program in the U.S. Police commissioner Donald Pomerleau, not known as an advocate for strict gun control, was credited in contemporary news stories, as coming up with the idea while at a funeral for an officer who was shot in the line of duty. Operation PASS (People Against Senseless Shootings) paid a $50 "bounty" for surrendered guns and $100 for tips leading to the confiscation of illegal guns. Some bounty seekers attempted to game the system by buying cheap, new guns that retailed for as low as $21.95 and then trying to turn them in. In all, the police collected 13,500 firearms - mostly handguns - at a cost of over $660,000. However, the city's already high gun homicide and assault rates actually increased during the program, for which police officials offered no explanation.

=== Massachusetts ===
From July 12–14, 2006, the Boston Police Department collected 1,000 firearms. Residents received a $200 Target gift card for each gun donated.

=== Michigan ===
At an August 2012 buyback, the Detroit Police Department paid $16,820 for 365 guns, including six assault weapons and a few sawed-off shotguns. The guns were collected at a church where participants could receive $50 to $100 for unloaded, operational weapons. Gun-carrying protesters offered to purchase the firearms from those in line for more money than the police were offering.

=== New Jersey ===
A buyback in Camden, New Jersey, in December 2012 collected 1,137 firearms. In April 2013, Newark Police Department collected more than 200 firearms during a buyback funded by Jewelry for a Cause. This was the first buyback in the city's history to be completely funded through private sources. Such programs allow residents to turn in guns for cash. In January 2014, Newark police director Samuel DeMaio said he was reviewing the implementation of an ongoing program instead of once or twice a year. Gun buybacks in several locations in Essex County, New Jersey, including Newark, collected about 1,700 guns in February 2013.

=== Washington ===
The city of Seattle has experimented with gun buyback programs since the early 1990s. Seattle's 1992 gun buyback was initiated in response to a string of shootings in a local neighborhood. The buyback program was watched with great interest given the local demographic and the generally positive public support for the buyback from residents of Seattle and the surrounding area. A public health survey titled "Money for Guns" was conducted and while it concluded that no statistically significant result was produced on Seattle's gun crime or gun death ratio, the report maintained that a larger buyback program would be sure to yield positive results. While Seattle's 2013 gun buyback program could be considered a success, collecting more than 700 guns, handing out almost $70,000 in gift cards and even netting a Stinger missile launcher tube, the program also had a widely unanticipated effect from the local gun buying community. Hundreds of gun buyers showed up to the event seeking to offer cash for valuable antiques or functioning second hand firearms. The lack of any need for background check in transactions involving private firearms sales turned the city sponsored event into an open air gun bazaar. Since then other cities have experienced similar situations, including private sales and/or local gun owners taking advantage of lucrative gift card offers to unload rusted or non-functioning firearms onto the police.
