= Pati Navalta Poblete =

- Born: Pati Navalta
- Occupations: Communications executive, author, advocate
- Employer: California State University
- Known for: Gun violence prevention advocacy; Founder of the Robby Poblete Foundation
- Notable work: My Filipino Grandparents in America (2006); A Better Life: A Memoir of Peace in the Face of Tragedy (2018)
- Title: Associate Vice Chancellor, Strategic Communications and Brand Marketing

Pati Navalta Poblete is an American communications executive, author, and gun violence prevention advocate. She serves as Associate Vice Chancellor of Strategic Communications and Brand Marketing for the Office of the Chancellor at the California State University system.

Poblete is the founder and executive director of the Robby Poblete Foundation, a nonprofit organization dedicated to reducing gun violence and creating career pathways for at-risk populations. She established the foundation after the shooting death of her son, Robby Poblete, on September 21, 2014, in Vallejo, California.

== Career ==
At California State University, Poblete leads systemwide strategic communications and brand marketing initiatives for the nation’s largest four-year public university system. She has held senior communications roles within the CSU system, including leadership in public affairs and integrated marketing.

Her work has included overseeing major systemwide campaigns and strategic messaging initiatives.

== Writing ==
Poblete is the author of The Oracles: My Filipino Grandparents in America (Heyday Books, 2006), a work exploring Filipino American identity and intergenerational experience. The book has been discussed in coverage of Filipino American literature and representation.

She later authored A Better Life: A Memoir of Peace in the Face of Tragedy (Nothing But the Truth Publishing, 2018), recounting her family’s experience after her son’s death and her advocacy work.

== Advocacy ==
Following her son’s death, Poblete became an advocate for gun violence prevention and restorative justice initiatives. Through the Robby Poblete Foundation, she has promoted programs that convert firearms into art and support job training and career pathways for individuals impacted by violence.

She has spoken publicly about gun policy and community safety, including appearances in national media discussions. Her advocacy has also been recognized in Filipino American media outlets and journalism circles.

== Awards ==
- The Headliner Award, 2007: Second Place in Editorial Writing
- Scripps Howard Foundation Editorial Commentary Prize, 2007, for writing on California's troubled foster care system
- Society of Professional Journalists Sigma Chi Award, 2006, for “California’s Dysfunctional Foster-Care System” article at the San Francisco Chronicle.
