= Demographics of Sydney =

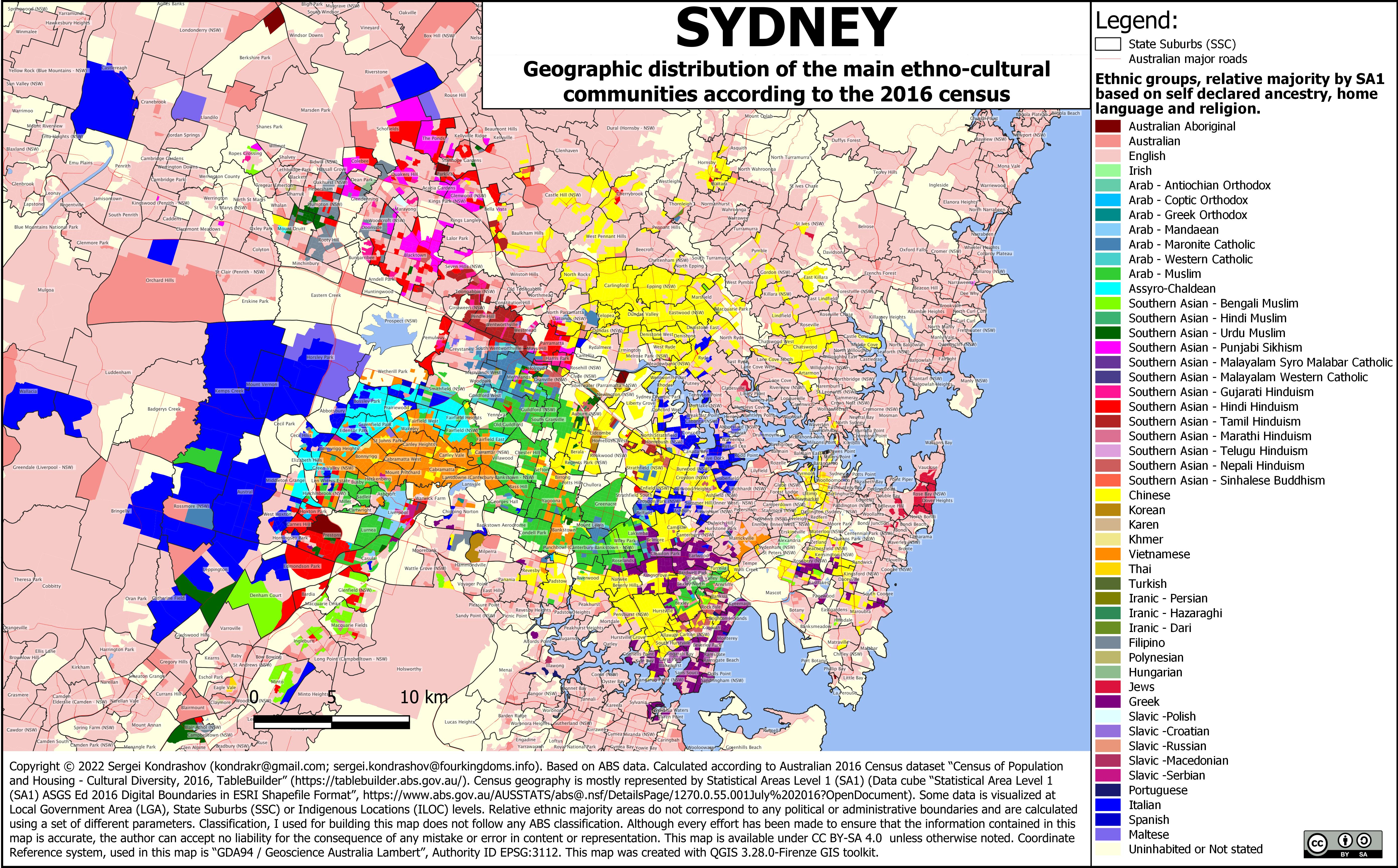
Geographic distribution of the main ethno-cultural communities of Sydney according to the 2016 census

Map of the median age of Sydney residents by postal area in the 2011 census

Sydney is Australia's most populous city, and is also the most populous city in Oceania. In the 2021 census, 5,231,147 persons declared themselves as residents of the Sydney Statistical Division–about one-fifth (20.58%) of Australia's total population. With a population density of 2037 people per square kilometre, the urban core has population density five times that of the greater region.

Sydney is the most densely populated city in Australia and is also the busiest city in Australia. The median age of Sydney residents was 37 years, and households comprised an average of 2.7 members.

== History ==
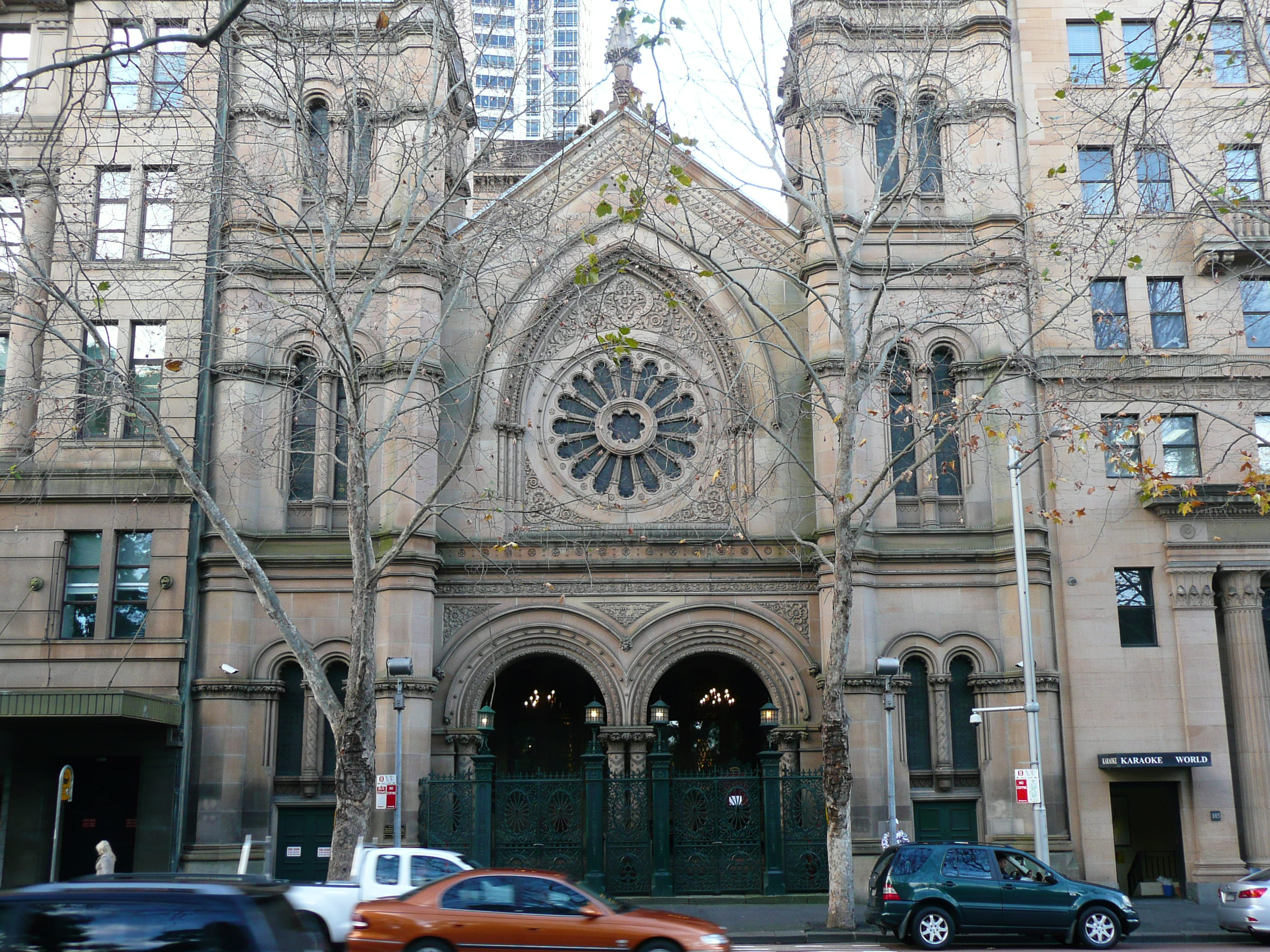
The Great Synagogue of Sydney, constructed in 1878

Sydney population by year
1796	2,953
1828	10,815
1833	16,232
1836	19,729
1841	29,973
1846	38,358
1851	44,240
1856	53,358
1911	629,503
1921	899,099
1933	1,235,367
1947	1,484,434
1954	1,863,217
1961	2,183,231
1971	2,807,828
1981	3,204,696
1991	3,672,855
1996	3,881,136
2001	4,128,272
2006	4,281,988
2011	4,627,345
2016	4,823,991
2021	5,231,147

European settlement in Sydney began in 1788, and in 1800 Sydney had around 3,000 non-indigenous inhabitants. It took time for the city's population to grow–in 1851 its population was only 39,000, compared with 77,000 in Melbourne. The subsequent gold rushes in Victoria caused the population of Melbourne to increase rapidly, while the lesser gold rushes in New South Wales had a less profound effect on the population of Sydney.

Sydney overtook Melbourne as Australia's most populous city in the early twentieth century, and reached the million inhabitants milestone around 1925. The opening of the Sydney Harbour Bridge in 1932 helped pave the way for further urban development north of Sydney Harbour. Post-war immigration and a baby boom helped the population reach 2 million by 1962. Sydney remained Australia's most populous city throughout the 20th century, and is projected to retain this position until between 2032 and 2046.

At the August 2021 Australian census, Sydney's population reached 5 million people.

== Density ==
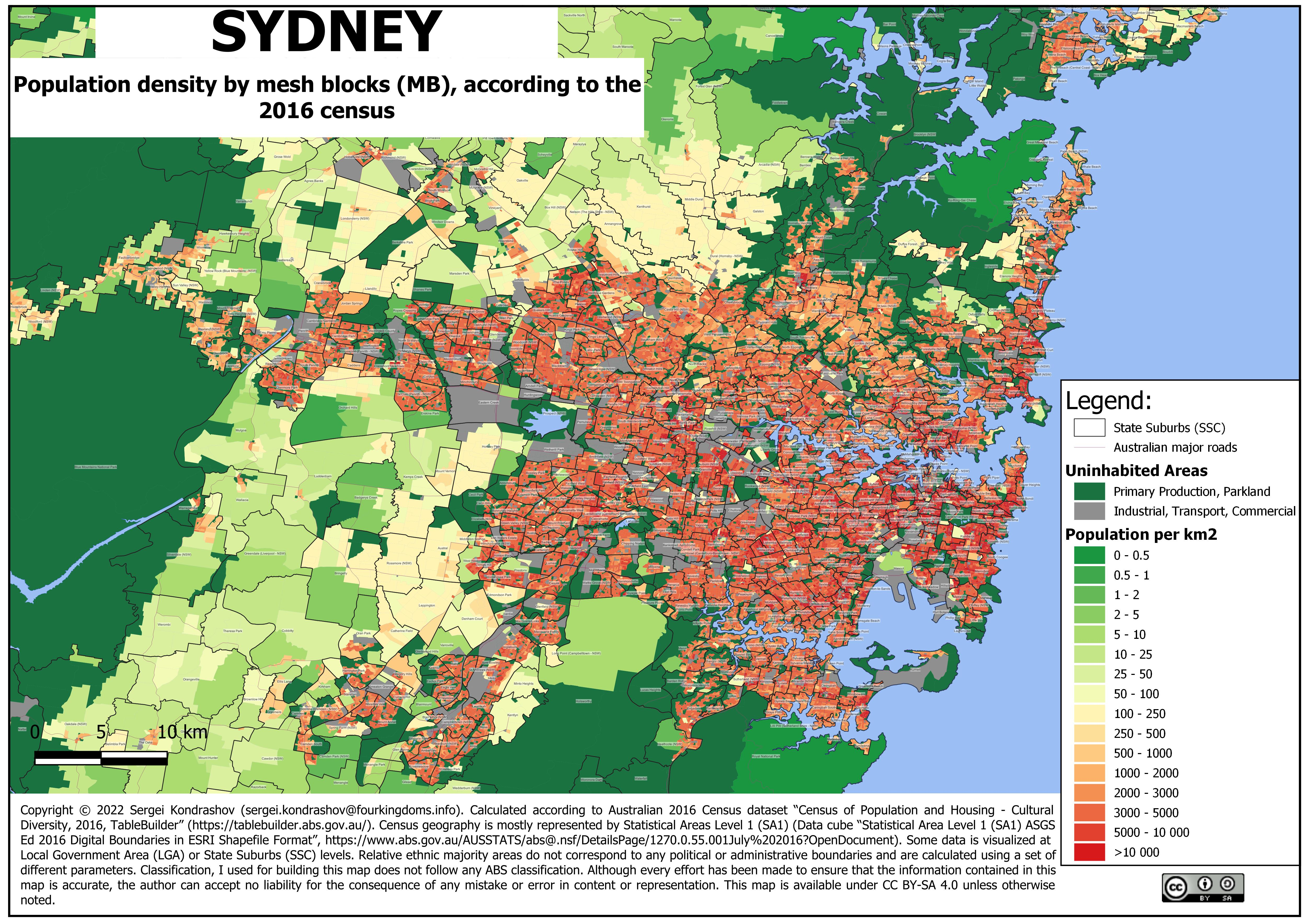
Sydney population density by mesh blocks, according to the 2016 census

Sydney is particularly noted for its low population density, due to its history. Surrounded by land that was considered unowned by the city's founders, early Sydney enjoyed relatively low land values. Coupled with successive governments' willingness to release new land on the city's outskirts for further development, this history has given Sydney a low-density self-image.

== Multiculturalism ==
Country of birth (2021)
Birthplace (Note: In accordance with the Australian Bureau of Statistics source, England, Scotland, Mainland China and the Special Administrative Regions of Hong Kong and Macau are listed separately.)	Population
Australia	2,970,737
Mainland China	238,316
India	187,810
England	153,052
Vietnam	93,778
Philippines	91,339
New Zealand	85,493
Lebanon	61,620
Nepal	59,055
Iraq	52,604
South Korea	50,702
Hong Kong SAR	46,182
South Africa	39,564
Italy	38,762
Indonesia	35,413
Malaysia	35,002
Fiji	34,197
Pakistan	31,025

Most immigrants to Sydney between 1840 and 1930 were British and Irish. At the 2021 census, the most commonly nominated ancestries were: (Note: As a percentage of 4,920,815 persons who nominated their ancestry at the 2021 census.)

- English (21.8%)
- Australian (20.4%) (Note: The Australian Bureau of Statistics has stated that most who nominate "Australian" as their ancestry are part of the Anglo-Celtic group.)
- Chinese (11.6%)
- Irish (7.2%)
- Scottish (5.6%)
- Indian (4.9%)
- Italian (4.3%)
- Lebanese (3.5%)
- Filipino (2.7%)
- Greek (2.6%)
- Vietnamese (2.5%)
- German (2.2%)
- Korean (1.4%)
- Nepalese (1.4%)
- Australian Aboriginal (1.4%)
- Maltese (1.1%)

At the 2021 census, there were 2,260,410 people living in Sydney that were born overseas, accounting for 43.2% of the population of Sydney, above Vancouver (42.5%), Los Angeles (37.7%), New York City (37.5%), Chicago (20.7%), Paris (14.6%) and Berlin (13%). Only 31.0% of the population had both parents born in Australia. Sydney has the eighth-largest immigrant population among world metropolitan areas. Foreign countries of birth with the greatest representation are Mainland China, India, England, Vietnam and the Philippines.

42.0% of people in Sydney speak a language other than English at home with Mandarin (5.0%), Arabic (4.2%), Cantonese (2.8%), Vietnamese (2.2%) and Hindi (1.5%) the most widely spoken.

1.7% of the population, or 90,939 people, identified as Indigenous Australians (Aboriginal Australians and Torres Strait Islanders) in 2021. (Note: Of any ancestry. Includes those identifying as Aboriginal Australians or Torres Strait Islanders. Indigenous identification is separate to the ancestry question on the Australian Census and persons identifying as Aboriginal or Torres Strait Islander may identify any ancestry.)

Sydney has been a hub of a number of migrant communities, such as the Lebanese, Fijian, Korean and Nepalese. Well over half of Australia's 25,000-strong Nepalese community, for example, is concentrated in Sydney. Seven out of every ten Lebanese migrants in Australia live in Sydney. The Ghanaian community has been noted as being quite visible in Sydney, with the number of Ghanaian churches being unusually large considering the relatively small number of Ghanaians in Australia. Furthermore, the suburb of Fairfield in the Greater Western Sydney area, is an ethnic enclave of Assyrian Christians, where they are the largest ethnic group in the suburb and also in the surrounding areas of Fairfield Heights, Prairiewood and Greenfield Park. There is a Romani community in Sydney.

In 1947, 12.8% were foreign born in Sydney, which had risen to 22.1% in 1966. In 1971, 37.6% of Sydney were either the children of immigrants (12.7%) or immigrants themselves (24.9%).

== Religion ==
As of the 2021 Census, the most common responses for religion in Greater Sydney were Christian (45.8%), Islam (6.3%), Hinduism (4.8%), and Buddhism (3.8%). Among those who identified as Christian, the most common denominations were Catholic (22.1%) and Anglican (9.2%), with 2.5% of responders answering "Christian: Not further defined".

The proportion of people who were not religious or had secular beliefs was 30.5%, up from 24.9% five years prior.

Major religious groups in Sydney (2021)
Religion	Total population	% of total
Christianity	2,394,622	45.8%
Islam	329,566	6.3%
Hinduism	253,210	4.8%
Buddhism	200,547	3.8%
Sikhism	38,713	0.7%
Judaism	37,879	0.7%
Non-classifiable religious belief	23,803	0.5%
No religion/secular beliefs	1,597,467	30.5%
Not stated	326,469	6.2%
Total population	5,231,144	100%

== See also ==
- Demographics of Australia
- Immigration to Australia
- List of population demographics of New South Wales by local government area
