= 2026 Australia gun buyback program =

Proposed public safety initiative in Australia

2026 National Gun Buyback Program
- Date: 19 December 2025 (announced)
- Location: Australia
- Type: Gun buyback program
- Motive: Response to the 2025 Bondi Beach shooting
- Target: Surplus, newly banned and illegal firearms
- Organised by: Federal government in partnership with state and territory governments

On 19 December 2025, Australian prime minister Anthony Albanese announced a proposed national gun buyback program following a terrorist attack at Bondi Beach in Sydney, New South Wales on 14 December 2025.

== Background ==
In 1996, following the Port Arthur massacre, a buyback program was put in place. The program saw the collection of more than 650,000 newly prohibited firearms. During the two years when the program was carried out, 1996 and 1997, the percentage of homicide rates dropped the most in any two-year timeframe in Australia between 1915 and 2004, although the rates increased slightly in 1997, and peaked in 1999 but have declined since 2007.

On 14 December 2025, a mass shooting occurred at Bondi Beach during a Hanukkah celebration with two gunmen allegedly killing fifteen people and injuring forty. The fifteen victims were aged between 10 and 87. One of the gunmen had a firearms licence and was the registered owner of six firearms.

== New state and territory firearms laws ==
On 15 December 2025, at a National Cabinet meeting, all the state and territory governments agreed to strengthen firearms laws in the wake of the mass shooting. The federal government proposes that state and territory governments agree to ambitious new firearm law reforms no later than March 2026, and that reforms are legislated no later than 1 July 2026.

== Buyback funding ==
The federal government will introduce legislation to support funding the buyback. The cost of the buyback, which is expected to collect hundreds of thousands of firearms, will be split between the federal government and with the state and territory governments. On 20 January, the federal parliament passed laws to establish the funding scheme for the buyback.

== Collection of prohibited firearms ==
The federal government proposes that states and territories be responsible for the collection, processing and payment to individuals for surrendered firearms. The Australian Federal Police will be responsible for the destruction of surrendered firearms.

=== Implementation ===
New South Wales Premier Chris Minns has announced plans to begin the buyback program there on 2 November 2026, with individuals being eligible for up to $1,000 AUD per firearm surrendered. The state also prohibits any individual from owning more than 4 firearms in the wake of the aforementioned Bondi Beach shooting.

== See also ==
- Gun violence in Australia
