= Archer Park =

Park in New South Wales, Australia

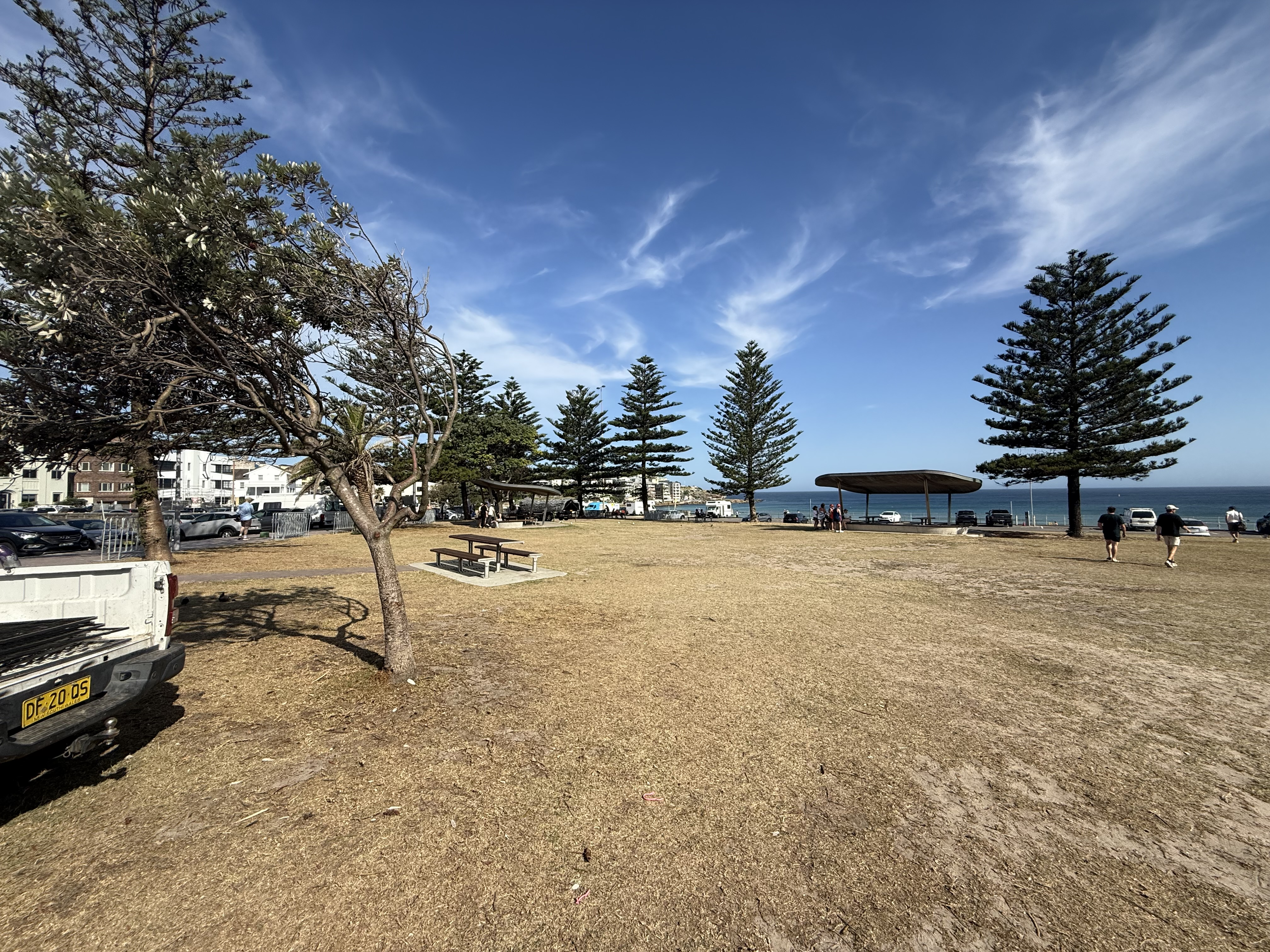
- View of Archer Park, four days after the 2025 Bondi Beach shooting
- Interactive map of Archer Park
- Location: New South Wales, Australia
- Nearest city: Sydney
- Coordinates: 33.8897°S 151.2788°E
- Elevation: 7 m (23 ft)

Archer Park is a park in Bondi Beach, New South Wales, Australia. It is located in the eastern suburbs of Sydney.

== Geography ==
The terrain surrounding Archer Park is generally flat, and the park itself is situated within a valley. The highest nearby point is Lynn Park, which rises to approximately 93 metres above sea level and is located about 2.2 kilometres north of Archer Park.

The surrounding area is densely populated, with an estimated population density of around 3,757 people per square kilometre.

== Climate ==
Archer Park has a humid subtropical climate, according to the Köppen–Geiger climate classification. The average annual temperature is approximately 18 °C. January is the warmest month, with average temperatures around 25 °C, while June is the coolest month, averaging about 11 °C.

The average annual rainfall is approximately 1,380 millimetres. February is typically the wettest month, receiving around 200 millimetres of rainfall, while July is the driest month, with about 36 millimetres.

== Notable incidents ==
On 14 December 2025, Archer Park was the scene of a terror attack during a Jewish event, when two gunmen opened fire on crowds in and around the park, killing 15 and injuring 40 people.
