= Caliber Collection =

American jewelry company

Caliber Collection (formerly Jewelry for a Cause) is an online company that was founded by Jessica Pollack Mindich, an American jewelry designer, in December 2008.

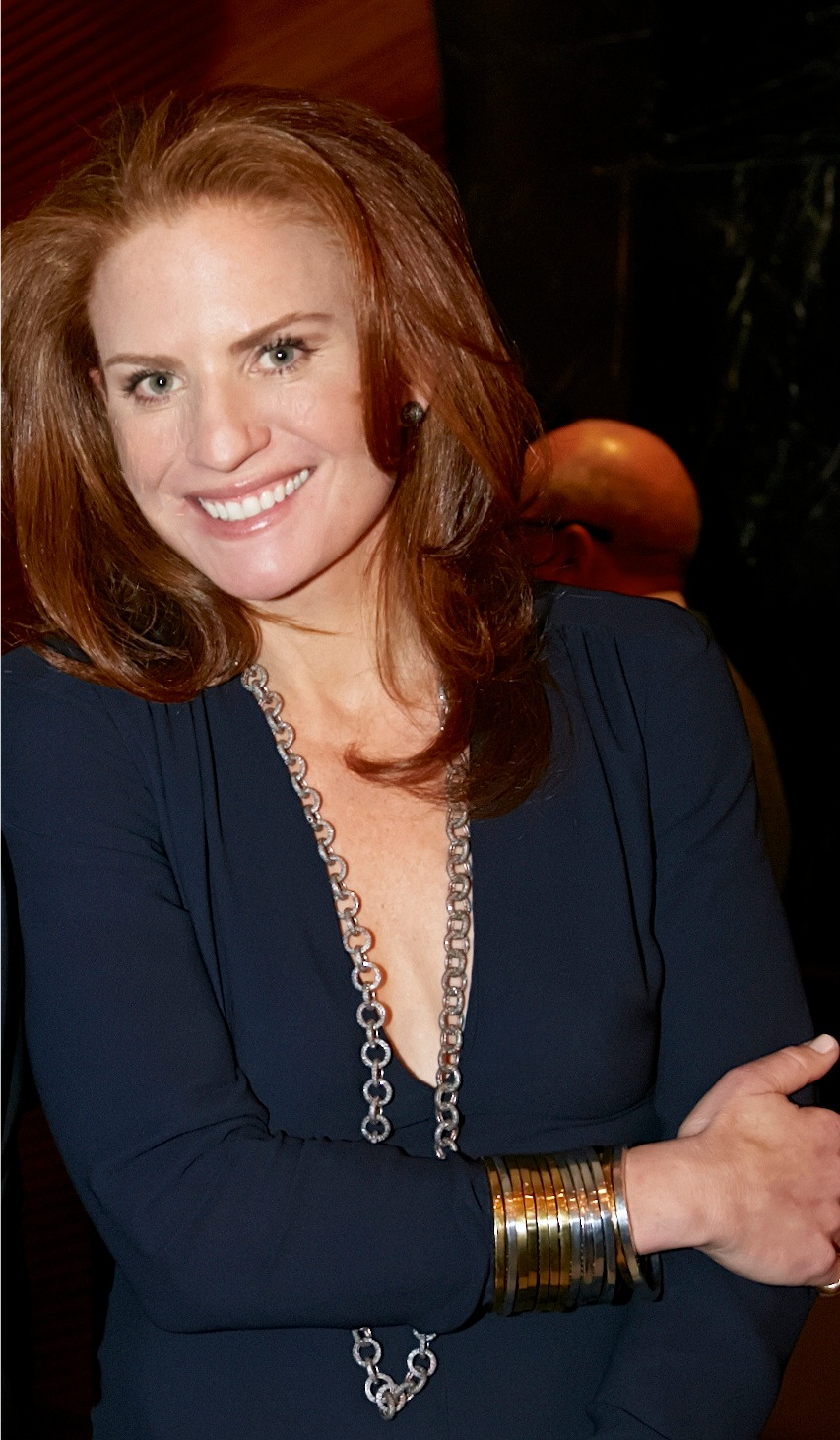
Founder and CEO of the Caliber Collection, formerly known as Jewelry for a Cause.

== History ==
In 2008, Mindich launched Jewelry for a Cause, with the idea of making and selling jewelry to raise money for both foreign and domestic causes.

== Gun buyback ==
=== Newark ===
On the weekend of April 27, 2013, the Newark Police Department in New Jersey and Jewelry for a Cause hosted a gun buyback. Police recovered 210 weapons, including eight assault rifles. The weekend event was fully funded by Mindich's company by providing $60,000, from the sales of the Caliber Collection bracelets, in total to the cause.

== San Francisco ==
Captain Michael Perry, of the Pittsburg Police Department in California, shipped Mindich disabled guns from the department's buyback program in 2013 to create the Caliber San Francisco jewelry line. A privately funded buyback had collected 291 weapons, including semi-automatic rifles, handguns, shotguns and manually operated rifles. "San Francisco" is stamped on the inside of the bracelet to represent the Bay area as a whole. A portion of the sales goes towards future gun buybacks in Pittsburg, California.
