= List of population demographics of New South Wales by local government area =

This is a list of population demographics of New South Wales by local government area as at the 2016 census.^{a}

The local government area with the largest population was City of Canterbury-Bankstown with 346,302 people resident on census night; and the area with the smallest population was Lord Howe Island with 698.^{a} As at census night, the local government area with the largest population density was the City of Sydney with approximately 8,335 people per square kilometre; and the area with the smallest population density was the Unincorporated Far West with approximately 0.01 person per square kilometre.

Local government area	Region	Area			Population		Population density		References
Local government area	Region	km^{2}	sq mi	Rank	2016 census	Rank	People/km^{2}	Rank	References
Albury, City of	Riverina	164	63	107	51,076	44	311.43	32	
Armidale Regional Council	New England	8,621	3,329	27	29,449	60	3.42	79	
Ballina Shire	Northern Rivers	484	187	92	41,790	50	86.34	40	
Balranald Shire	Riverina	21,693	8,376	7	2,287	126	0.11	125	
Bathurst Region	Central West	3,820	1,470	55	41,300	51	10.81	58	
Bayside Council	Eastern Suburbs / St George-Sutherland	50	19	114	156,058	17	3,121.16	14	
Bega Valley Shire	South Coast	6,279	2,424	37	33,253	57	5.30	68	
Bellingen Shire	Mid North Coast	1,602	619	80	12,668	84	7.91	63	
Berrigan Shire	Riverina	2,066	798	75	8,462	97	4.10	76	
Blacktown, City of	Western Sydney	247	95	103	336,962	2	1,364.22	22	
Bland Shire	Central West / Riverina	8,560	3,310	29	5,995	109	0.70	115	
Blayney Shire	Central West	1,525	589	81	7,257	100	4.76	70	
Blue Mountains, City of	Western Sydney / Blue Mountains	1,432	553	83	76,904	31	53.70	46	
Bogan Shire	Orana	14,611	5,641	12	2,692	125	0.18	123	
Bourke Shire	Orana	41,679	16,092	4	2,834	123	0.07	128	
Brewarrina Shire	Orana	19,188	7,409	8	1,651	128	0.09	127	
Broken Hill, City of	Far West	170	66	106	17,708	72	104.16	39	
Burwood Council	Inner West	7	2.7	129	36,809	55	5,258.43	4	
Byron Shire	Northern Rivers	567	219	91	31,556	58	55.65	45	
Cabonne Shire	Central West	6,026	2,327	38	13,386	80	2.22	88	
Camden Council	Macarthur	201	78	104	78,219	29	389.15	31	
Campbelltown, City of	Macarthur	312	120	98	157,006	16	503.22	27	
Canada Bay, City of	Inner West	20	7.7	121	88,015	27	4,400.75	8	
Canterbury-Bankstown, City of	South-Western Sydney	72	28	112	346,302	1	4,809.75	6	
Carrathool Shire	Central West / Riverina	18,933	7,310	9	2,719	124	0.14	124	
Central Coast Council	Central Coast	1,681	649	78	327,736	3	194.96	37	
Central Darling Shire	Far West	53,511	20,661	2	1,833	127	0.03	129	
Cessnock, City of	Hunter	1,966	759	77	55,560	42	28.26	47	
Clarence Valley Council	Northern Rivers	10,441	4,031	18	50,671	45	4.85	69	
Cobar Shire	Orana	44,065	17,014	3	4,647	113	0.11	125	
Coffs Harbour, City of	Mid North Coast	1,175	454	86	72,944	33	62.08	44	
Coolamon Shire	Riverina	2,433	939	73	4,315	114	1.77	94	
Coonamble Shire	Orana	9,926	3,832	20	3,918	116	0.39	118	
Cootamundra-Gundagai Regional Council	Riverina	3,981	1,537	54	11,141	89	2.80	81	
Cowra Shire	Central West	2,810	1,080	67	12,460	85	4.34	75	
Cumberland Council	Western Sydney	72	28	112	216,079	7	3,001.10	15	
Dubbo Regional Council	Orana	7,536	2,910	31	50,077	46	6.65	65	
Dungog Shire	Hunter	2,251	869	74	8,975	93	3.99	78	
Edward River Council	Riverina	8,881	3,429	25	8,851	95	1.00	107	
Eurobodalla Shire	South Coast	3,428	1,324	59	37,232	54	10.86	57	
Fairfield, City of	Western Sydney	102	39	109	198,817	11	1,949.19	20	
Federation Council	Riverina	5,685	2,195	41	12,777	83	2.25	87	
Forbes Shire	Central West	4,720	1,820	49	9,587	91	2.03	90	
Georges River Council	St George	38	15	116	146,841	19	3,864.24	10	
Gilgandra Shire	Orana	4,836	1,867	46	4,236	115	0.88	111	
Glen Innes Severn Council	New England	5,487	2,119	42	8,836	96	1.61	96	
Goulburn Mulwaree Council	Southern Tablelands	3,220	1,240	64	29,609	59	9.20	60	
Greater Hume Shire	Riverina	5,746	2,219	40	10,351	90	1.80	93	
Griffith, City of	Riverina	1,640	630	79	25,641	63	15.64	54	
Gunnedah Shire	New England	4,994	1,928	45	12,215	86	2.45	85	
Gwydir Shire	New England	9,453	3,650	22	5,258	112	0.56	116	
Hawkesbury, City of	Western Sydney	2,793	1,078	69	64,592	38	23.13	49	
Hay Shire	Riverina	11,326	4,373	16	2,946	121	0.26	120	
Hills Shire, The	Hills District	401	155	95	157,243	15	392.13	30	
Hilltops Council	Southern Tablelands	7,139	2,756	34	18,498	71	2.59	83	
Hornsby Shire	North Shore / Northern Suburbs	462	178	93	142,667	20	308.80	33	
Hunters Hill, Municipality of	Northern Suburbs	6	2.3	130	13,999	79	2,333.17	19	
Inner West Council	Inner West	35	14	118	182,043	14	5,201.23	5	
Inverell Shire	New England	8,606	3,323	28	16,483	73	1.92	91	
Junee Shire	Riverina	2,030	780	76	6,295	104	3.10	80	
Kempsey Shire	Mid North Coast	3,380	1,310	62	28,885	61	8.55	62	
Kiama, Municipality of	Illawarra	258	100	101	21,464	67	83.19	41	
Ku-ring-gai Council	North Shore	86	33	110	118,053	22	1,372.71	21	
Kyogle Council	Northern Rivers	3,589	1,386	58	8,940	94	2.49	84	
Lachlan Shire	Central West	7,431	2,869	32	6,194	105	0.83	112	
Lake Macquarie, City of	Hunter	648	250	90	197,371	12	304.58	34	
Lane Cove, Municipality of	North Shore	11	4.2	125	36,051	56	3,277.36	11	
Leeton Shire	Riverina	1,167	451	87	11,168	88	9.57	59	
Lismore, City of	Northern Rivers	1,290	500	85	43,135	49	4.63	73	
Lithgow, City of	Central West / Blue Mountains	4,551	1,757	51	21,090	68	4.63	73	
Liverpool, City of	South-Western Sydney	306	118	99	204,326	9	667.73	25	
Liverpool Plains Shire	New England	5,086	1,964	44	7,687	99	1.51	98	
Lockhart Shire	Riverina	2,895	1,118	66	3,119	119	1.08	104	
Lord Howe Island		15	5.8	122	382	130	25.47	48	
Maitland, City of	Hunter	392	151	96	77,305	30	197.21	36	
Mid-Coast Council	Mid North Coast	10,053	3,881	19	90,303	26	8.98	61	
Mid-Western Regional	Central West	8,737	3,373	26	24,076	64	2.76	82	
Moree Plains Shire	New England	17,930	6,920	10	13,159	81	0.73	114	
Mosman, Municipality of	North Shore	9	3.5	127	28,475	62	3,163.89	13	
Murray River Council	Riverina	11,865	4,581	15	11,680	87	0.98	109	
Murrumbidgee Council	Riverina	6,880	2,660	36	3,836	117	0.56	116	
Muswellbrook Shire	Hunter	3,405	1,315	61	16,086	75	4.72	71	
Nambucca Shire	Mid North Coast	1,491	576	82	19,212	70	12.89	56	
Narrandera Shire	Riverina	4,117	1,590	52	5,853	110	1.42	100	
Narrabri Shire	North West Slopes / Northern Tablelands	13,031	5,031	13	13,084	82	1.00	107	
Narromine Shire	Orana	5,264	2,032	43	6,444	103	1.22	102	
Newcastle, City of	Hunter	187	72	105	155,411	18	831.07	24	
Northern Beaches Council	Northern Beaches	254	98	102	252,878	4	995.58	23	
North Sydney Council	North Shore	11	4.2	125	67,658	36	6,150.73	3	
Oberon Shire	Central West	3,659	1,413	57	5,301	111	1.45	99	
Orange, City of	Central West	285	110	100	40,344	52	141.56	38	
Parkes Shire	Central West	5,958	2,300	39	14,608	76	2.45	85	
Parramatta Council, City of	Western Sydney / Northern Suburbs	82	32	111	226,149	5	2,757.91	18	
Penrith, City of	Western Sydney	405	156	94	196,066	13	484.11	28	
Port Macquarie-Hastings Council	Mid North Coast	3,686	1,423	56	78,539	28	21.31	51	
Port Stephens Council	Hunter	979	378	88	69,556	34	71.05	42	
Queanbeyan–Palerang Regional Council	Southern Tablelands	8,960	3,460	23	56,027	41	6.25	66	
Randwick, City of	Eastern Suburbs	36	14	117	140,660	21	3,907.22	9	
Richmond Valley Council	Northern Rivers	3,051	1,178	65	22,807	66	7.48	64	
Ryde, City of	Northern Suburbs	41	16	115	116,302	23	2,836.63	17	
Singleton Council	Hunter	4,893	1,889	47	22,987	65	4.70	72	
Shellharbour, City of	Illawarra / South Coast	147	57	108	68,460	35	465.71	29	
Shoalhaven, City of	South Coast	4,567	1,763	50	99,650	24	21.82	50	
Snowy Monaro Regional Council	Snowy Mountains / Monaro	15,162	5,854	11	20,218	69	1.33	101	
Snowy Valleys Council	Riverina	8,960	3,460	23	14,395	77	1.61	96	
Strathfield, Municipality of	Inner West	14	5.4	123	40,312	53	2,879.43	16	
Sutherland Shire	Southern Sydney	370	140	97	218,464	6	590.44	26	
Sydney, City of	Sydney CBD	25	9.7	119	208,374	8	8,334.96	1	
Tamworth Regional Council	New England	9,892	3,819	21	59,663	40	6.03	67	
Temora Shire	Riverina	2,802	1,082	68	6,110	106	2.18	89	
Tenterfield Shire	New England	7,332	2,831	33	6,628	102	0.90	109	
Tweed Shire	Northern Rivers	1,321	510	84	91,371	25	69.17	43	
Unincorporated Far West	Far West	93,300	36,000	1	698^{a}	129	0.01	130	
Upper Hunter Shire	Hunter	8,096	3,126	30	14,112	78	1.74	95	
Upper Lachlan Shire	Southern Tablelands	7,102	2,742	35	7,695	98	1.08	104	
Uralla Shire	New England	3,230	1,250	63	6,048	108	1.87	92	
Wagga Wagga, City of	Riverina	4,826	1,863	48	62,385	39	12.93	55	
Walcha Shire	New England	2,621	1,012	71	3,092	120	1.18	103	
Walgett Shire	Orana	22,336	8,624	6	6,107	107	0.27	119	
Warren Shire	Orana	10,760	4,150	17	2,732	122	0.25	122	
Warrumbungle Shire	Orana	12,380	4,780	14	9,384	92	0.76	113	
Waverley Council	Eastern Suburbs	9	3.5	127	66,812	37	7,423.56	2	
Weddin Shire	Central West	3,410	1,320	60	3,664	118	1.07	106	
Wentworth Shire	Riverina	26,269	10,143	5	6,794	101	0.26	120	
Willoughby, City of	North Shore	23	8.9	120	74,302	32	3,230.52	12	
Wingecarribee Shire	Illawarra / Southern Highlands	2,689	1,038	70	47,882	48	17.81	53	
Wollondilly Shire	Macarthur	2,560	990	72	48,519	47	18.95	52	
Wollongong, City of	Illawarra	684	264	89	203,630	10	297.70	35	
Woollahra, Municipality of	Eastern Suburbs	12	4.6	124	54,240	43	4,520.00	7	
Yass Valley Council	Southern Tablelands / Riverina	3,999	1,544	53	16,142	74	4.04	77	

^a As of 27 June 2017, ABS census data for the Unincorporated Far West region was available for the 2011 census only.
