= Gaza war protests in Australia =

- Part of the Gaza war protests
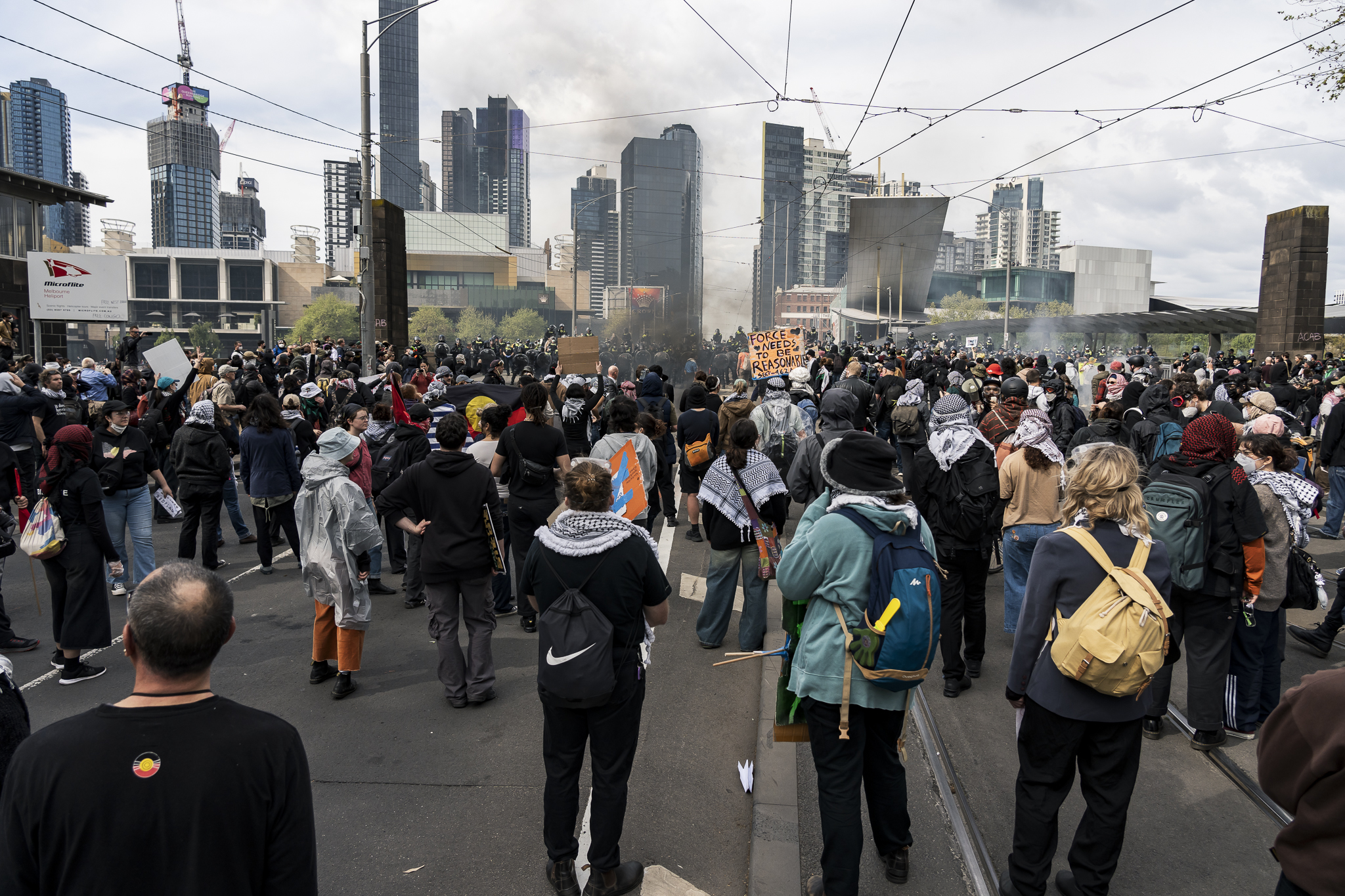
- Land Forces Expo protests in Southbank, Victoria
- Date: 9 October 2023 – present (3 years, 1 month, 1 week and 2 days)
- Location: Australia
- Caused by: Gaza war
- Methods: demonstrations, counter-protests, sit-ins, occupations, picketing, civil disobedience, direct action, online activism

Following the outbreak of the Gaza war in October 2023, pro-Palestinian protests were held in several Australian cities including Sydney, Melbourne, Adelaide, Brisbane and Perth.

Notable pro-Palestinian protests and campaigns have included weekly marches in Melbourne, Jewish peace activists occupying the electorate office of Defence Minister Richard Marles, blockades at the Port of Melbourne and Port Botany, the establishment of protest encampments at several Australian universities, the Melbourne Land Forces Expo protests, and the 2025 Sydney Harbour Bridge protest. Other notable protest actions have included Qantas flight crew donning Palestinian flag badges.

Pro-Israel counter-protests have also been held in Sydney and Melbourne.

== Protests in 2023 ==
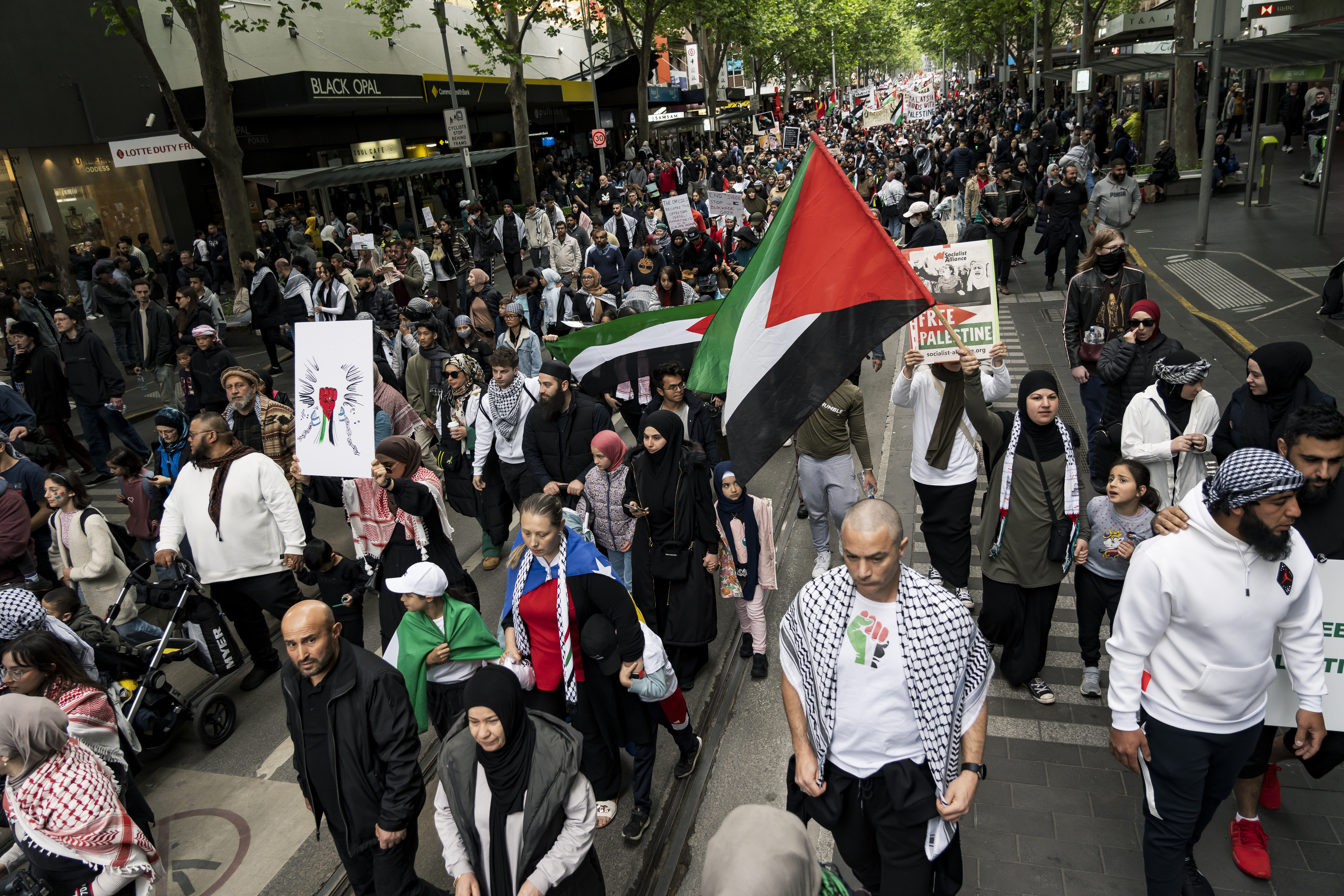
Protest opposing the bombing of Gaza, Melbourne, Australia, 15 October

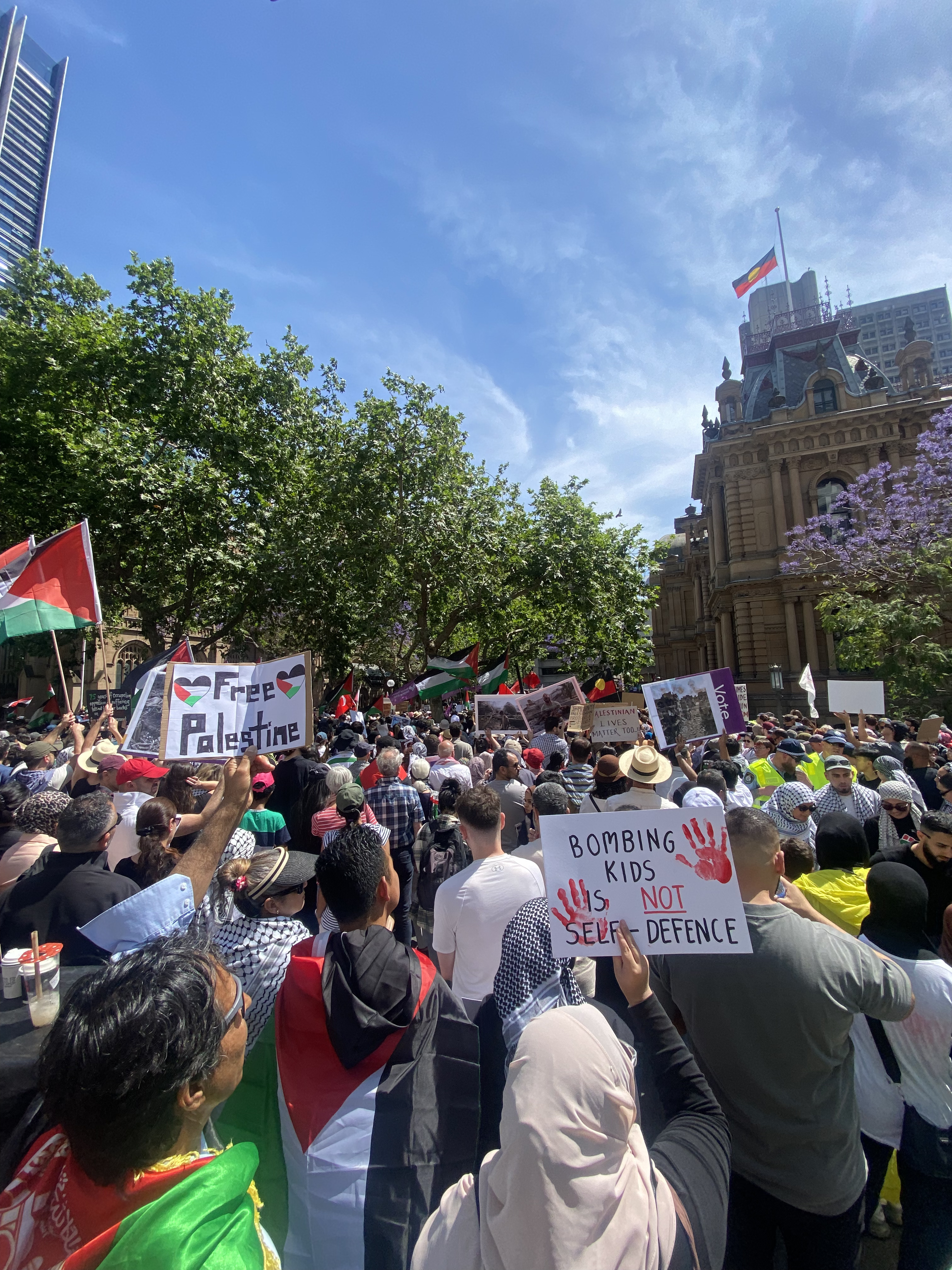
Pro-Palestinian protest in Sydney, Australia, 21 October

=== October 2023 ===
On the night of 9 October, around 1,000 protesters attended a pro-Palestinian rally in Sydney, calling on the Australian government to end support to Israel. The protestors marched through the city's central business district to the Sydney Opera House, which had been lit up with the colors of the Israeli flag to create a space "for Jews to mourn victims of the attacks in Israel". A small group lit flares and burned Israeli flags.

The Premier of New South Wales, Chris Minns, claimed that the Sydney Opera House had been "overrun with people that were spewing racial epithets and hatred". The government later apologised for the protests, with police confirming that they are investigating the participants and seeking to press charges. Jewish people were advised to avoid the area, and a man near the protest with an Israeli flag was detained to prevent a breach of the peace. Several witnesses claimed that they also chanted "Gas the Jews", although according to a police expert audio analysis of video from the event that was initially believed to have shown that call instead showed chants of "Where's the Jews".

Another similar rally took place in the south-western suburb of Lakemba. Reports of violence and antisemitism emerged from the protests, which were criticized by politicians including Minns and Prime Minister Anthony Albanese.

On 11 October, thousands gathered for a vigil held in Sydney showing support for Israel which was attended by a number of government officials. On 20 October, pro-Palestinian demonstrators blocked the entryway to the US spy base in Pine Gap, Northern Territory, calling for a ceasefire in Gaza. On 31 October, a group of Jewish activists occupied Defence Minister Richard Marles' office in Geelong, demanding an end to military support for Israel.

=== November 2023 ===
On 8 November, activists laid themselves down on the Port of Melbourne to block cargo headed for Israel.

On 10 November, a fast food restaurant in Caulfield was burned down in a suspicious fire, after the owner Hash Tayeh was photographed leading a pro-Palestine rally in Melbourne. Following the burning of the restaurant, about 200 pro-Palestinian demonstrators affiliated with the Free Palestine Melbourne group staged a protest march in Caulfield, which led to the evacuation of a nearby synagogue. The pro-Palestine march triggered a counter-demonstration by about 200 pro-Israel supporters from the local Jewish community. Police kept the two groups apart but made no arrests.

On 12 November, thousands attended pro-Palestinian rallies calling for an immediate ceasefire in several Australian state capitals including Sydney, Melbourne, and Brisbane. In addition, pro-Israel rallies were held in Sydney and Melbourne calling for the release of Hamas-held hostages and to oppose anti-semitism. On 16 November, a petition with the signatures of 40,000 medical professionals demanding a ceasefire was presented to parliament. On 21 November, 23 anti-war activists were arrested at Sydney's Port Botany for blocking its major roads.

On 23 November, hundreds of school-age children in Melbourne and Adelaide walked out of classes in a school strike to "free, free Palestine". On 26 November, Senator Lidia Thorpe spoke at a rally in support of Palestine, stating Aboriginal Australians were sympathetic to the struggles of Palestinians. Teachers in Victoria were warned against participating in any pro-Palestine related protests. Protesters held a die-in outside the offices of The Age.

A group of several dozen pro-Palestinian protesters in Melbourne prevented a delegation of families of victims of the 7 October attacks from entering their hotel. In response, the delegation sought assistance at the local police station.

=== December 2023 ===
On 21 December, protesters on kayaks blocked an Israel-linked cargo ship from entering the Port of Melbourne.

In late December 2023, cabin crew on a Qantas flight between Melbourne and Hobart donned Palestinian flag badges; which went against the airline's policy of wearing unapproved badges on their uniforms. Dvir Abramovich, the chairman of the Anti-Defamation Commission, criticised the cabin crew's conduct as intimidating, harassment and a violation of "every rule of air travel". An online petition calling for the dismissal of the cabin crew attracted 2,000 signatures. In response to media coverage, Qantas reiterated its policy against employees wearing unapproved badges on their uniforms.

== Protests in 2024 ==
=== January – March ===
Protesters blocked an Israeli cargo ship from entering the Port of Melbourne on 22 January 2024.

On 2 February, protesters in Melbourne blocked the entrance to the factory that produces parts for Israel's F-35 military jets.

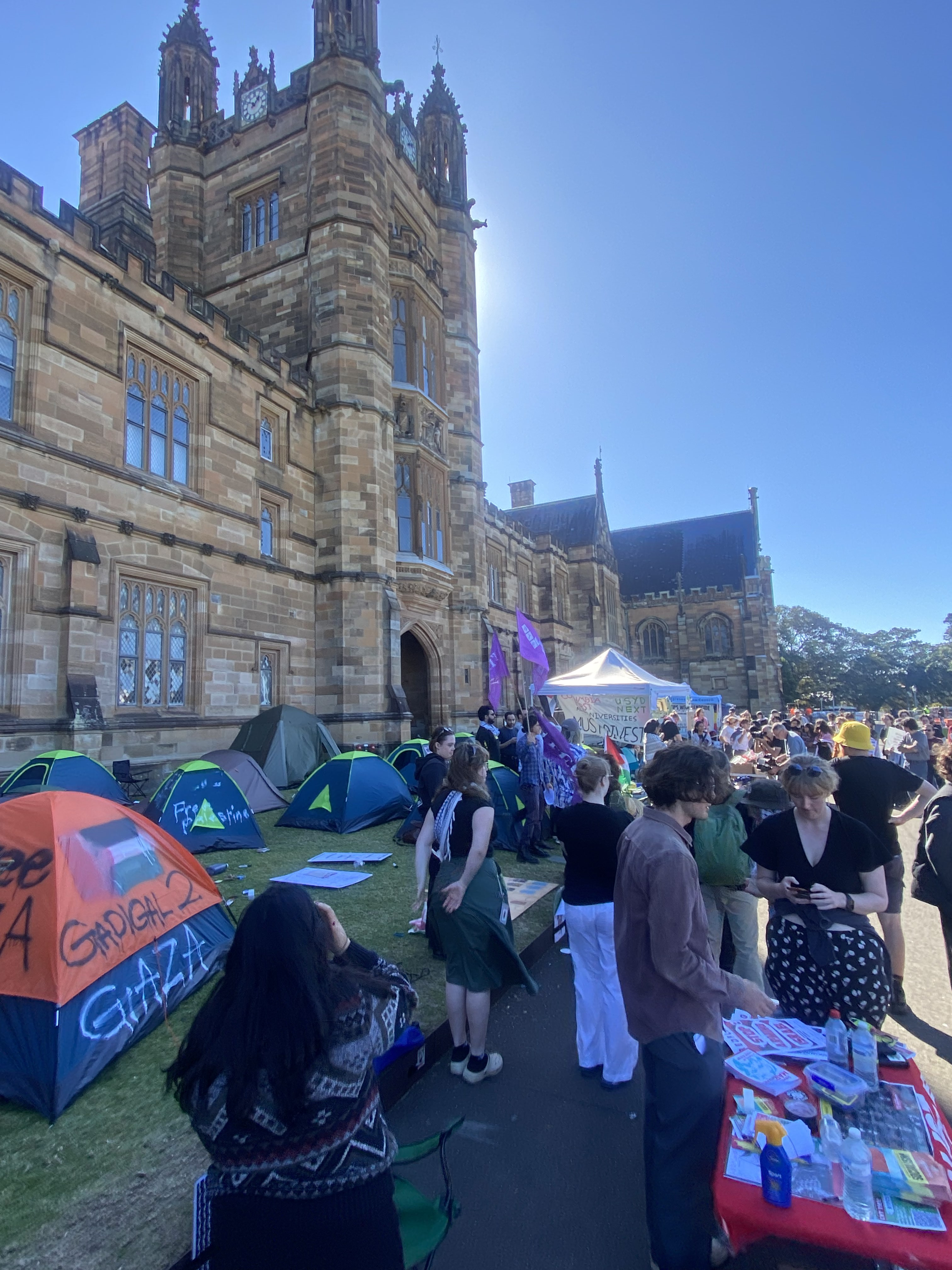
"Gaza Solidarity Encampment" at the University of Sydney, 26 April 2024

=== April – June ===
On 25 April students of the University of Sydney put up tents and shouted pro-Palestine slogans. After that, multiple other Australian universities set up encampments. On 8 May, Greens senator Dorinda Cox alleged she was "manhandled" by police while protesting as part of Students for Palestine WA at the Crown Perth casino and resort, where Prime Minister Anthony Albanese was speaking at a business breakfast, saying that the police told her group to move and allegedly shoved her into the crowd while she was speaking.

On 18 May, Trade Unionists for Palestine organised a protest at Melbourne's Moonee Valley Racecourse, which was hosting the Victorian Labor Party's State Conference. The protest action delayed planned speeches by Albanese and Premier of Victoria Jacinta Allan.

On 19 May, Palestinian solidarity protesters and the Christian Zionist group International Christian Embassy Jerusalem (ICEJ) held competing rallies outside the Victorian state parliament in Melbourne. Police estimated that 7,000 people attended the Nakba Sunday Rally and ICEJ's Never Again is Now Rally. Police separated the two groups and arrested six protesters.

=== July – September ===
On 11 September, Melbourne saw protests outside the Land Forces Expo, a military technology event. Victoria Police claimed it was the largest deployment of police against a protest since 2000.

== 2025 protests and counter-protests ==
=== New Year's Eve 2024 ===
On New Year's Eve, pro-Palestinian protest took place in Melbourne's Central Business District (CBD). During the demonstration, protesters entered a Starbucks café on Swanston Street, allegedly spitting at staff members and stealing merchandise.

=== May and June 2025 ===
In May 2025, thousands of people in the cities of Melbourne, Adelaide, and Brisbane joined demonstrations to commemorate Nakba Day.

In June 2025, a picket at SEC Plating in Sydney saw multiple protesters injured by police. Former Greens candidate Hannah Thomas was severely injured in the eye.

=== August 2025 Sydney Harbour Bridge protest ===
On 3 August, a large pro-Palestinian protest occurred on the Sydney Harbour Bridge and in Melbourne across the CBD and the King Street Bridge.

On 24 August, following Israeli prime minister Benjamin Netanyahu escalating his personal attacks on Australian prime minister Anthony Albanese over the government’s decision this month to recognise a Palestinian state, more than 40 pro-Palestinian rallies were held nationwide. Organisers claimed about 350,000 attendees (including ~50,000 in Brisbane), while police estimated Brisbane’s crowd at closer to 10,000; police gave no figures for Sydney or Melbourne.

=== After the 2025 partial ceasefire ===
Another series of nationwide protests were held on 12 October. Despite a ceasefire coming into effect two days earlier, the marches criticised the ongoing Israeli occupation of Gaza and the West Bank.

=== 8 September 2025 clash between Jewish protesters ===
Jewish Australian protesters clash with pro-Israel group at Bondi Beach. The protest was organised by Jews Against the Occupation, in support of the Gaza flotilla. One of the lead organisers was a Jewish woman who lived in the area. Despite this, Michael Gencher, executive director of pro-Zionist group StandWithUs in Australia, said that holding the protest in an area with a “targeted provocation”. The area is home to 20% of Australia's Jewish population.

The pro-Israel supporters called the protesters “inbred” and “terrorists” and shouted at them to “go back to Lakemba” (a suburb in Western Sydney with a reputation for having a high density of Muslim residents). The Sydney Morning Herald, said that the protests were mostly peaceful with the exception of a brief physical scuffle between the rival groups during which "punches were thrown". Police had been attempting to keep the groups apart.

=== 2026 Israeli presidential visit to Australia ===
In the December 2025 Bondi Beach shooting, which was, despite claims by some Israeli and Australian politicians, not linked to prior pro-Palestine protests in Australia, NSW Premier Chris Minns to proposed new laws enabling police to refuse to authorise protests or mass gatherings, which passed New South Wales Parliament on 24 December 2025.

The attack also led to a highly controversial state visit from Israeli President Isaac Herzog, with the alleged intention of consoling the grieving Jewish community; Herzog had been invited by the Zionist Federation of Australia, and then prime minister Albanese elevated this to a state visit. In response to widespread objections, Albanese claimed that he also used the opportunity to speak to the president about issues such as the need for criminal prosecution of the Israel Defense Forces personnel who killed Zomi Frankcom, an Australian aid worker, who was killed by an Israeli airstrike on the World Central Kitchen aid convoy in the Gaza Strip.

On 9 February 2026, Herzog arrived in Sydney. The same day, the NSW Supreme Court dismissed a challenge to the new legal powers given to police to disrupt protesters. Protests against Herzog's visit were held in cities across the country. Herzog's visit was opposed by many Australians due to his well-documented support for the Gaza Genocide, including attributing the October 7 attacks to "an entire nation", and handwriting a message on an artillery shell that was about to be fired on Gaza. Protests in the area around Sydney Town Hall, which was within the declared exclusion zone, were met with a violent response from police, including use of pepper spray, punching protesters, and forcibly removing a group of Muslim protesters while they were praying on the ground. On 13 February, the Law Enforcement Conduct Commission launched an investigation into the conduct of NSW Police personnel during a pro-Palestine rally outside the Sydney Town Hall on 9 February.

On 12 February, 5,000 pro-Palestine protesters marched through Melbourne's CBD to the Parliament of Victoria to protest against Herzog's visit. A smaller group of pro-Palestine protesters gathered outside an event hosting Herzog in Southbank, Victoria, where they faced counter-demonstrators from a pro-Israel group called "Lions of Zion". This group of pro-Palestine protesters rejoined the main group in the Melbourne CBD. Unlike the Sydney Town Hall protest, the police response to the Melbourne protest was peaceful, with police only making one arrest.

== Protests against weapons manufacturing ==
=== Bisalloy Steel Protests ===
Starting in 2023, protestors held a series of actions at Bisalloy Steel in Wollongong. These have included a sit-in and at least 9 pickets. Bisalloy Steel is Australia's only manufacturer of armour steel, which it exports to Israel. Protesters have alleged that this constitutes complicity in Israeli war crimes, while the company has emphasized the small proportion of its total business which goes to Israel. The pickets have shut down Bisalloy for up to 72 hours at a time.

An anti-Zionist Jewish protester was arrested for assault at an early sit-in action, though they were eventually found not guilty.

The protests have been attended by NSW Greens Senator David Shoebridge and MP Sue Higginson.

=== 2024 Melbourne Land Forces Expo protests ===
The 2024 Land Forces protests, also known as Disrupt Land Forces, were a series of anti-war protests which took place from 8–13 September in Melbourne, Australia. Thousands of protesters occupied streets around the Melbourne Convention and Exhibition Centre, where the 2024 Land Forces exhibition was taking place with the support of the Australian federal government and the Victorian state government.

Disrupt Land Forces highlighted the links between Australian governments and the Israeli weapons industry, as part of ongoing opposition to Israel's attacks on Gaza. The Land Forces exhibition included weapons which have been deployed by Israel in Gaza. Protest organisers denounced the event as "a cabal of war practitioners and war profiteers".

The state government of Victoria deployed a large police contingent to defend Land Forces from protesters. According to Victoria Police, it was the largest single deployment of officers in the state since the S11 protests in 2000. 82 people were arrested in connection with the protests and over 150 were injured by police during the picket on 11 September.

==== Events ====
Starting from 8 September, there were daily actions before and during the Land Forces conference. These were organised by various groups, as part of the Disrupt Land Forces coalition.

===== 7 September =====
On the afternoon of 7 September, a woman locked herself on to a car blocking the Montague St exit off the West Gate Freeway, blocking and delaying access to the Melbourne Convention and Exhibition Centre. Protesters were chanting the "usual slogans", including "From the River to the Sea" . The woman was cut free by police and arrested. A second woman, who was reportedly the designated police liaison person for the protest group, was also arrested for ‘aiding and abetting’ the woman protesting.

===== 11 September =====
Between 4,000 and 5,000 protesters gathered from 6am for the first major demonstration, led by activist groups Students for Palestine and Disrupt Wars. Protestors blockaded entrances to the venue and disrupted attendees attempting to enter the weapons exhibition. Students for Palestine described the event as "a beautiful, defiant day of protest and disruption".

Over 1,600 police were deployed to protect the weapons exhibition. Victoria Police have been accused of a police riot by legal observers, with excessive force and weaponry including rubber bullets and flash grenades being used against unarmed protesters. At least 100 people were injured by police violence, including at least one journalist and a photographer who required surgery after being hit in the ear by a rubber bullet. In anticipation of the event, police were granted extended powers under the Terrorism Act. Police alleged afterward that they had rocks, eggs, rotten tomatoes and horse manure thrown at them.

By the afternoon, after the protesters had largely dispersed, police had barricaded the Spencer Street Bridge to all road traffic.

Victorian Greens MP Gabrielle De Vietri confirmed her attendance at the protest that morning. In response, Victorian Premier Jacinta Allan suggested that De Vietri should resign from her position.

===== 12 September =====
On the morning of the second day of the Land Forces expo, a group of protesters gathered and marched around the streets surrounding the exhibition centre, holding up peak hour morning traffic with police extending an exclusion zone outside the expo.

In the late afternoon, a large group of protesters gathered outside the Hanwha headquarters in the Melbourne CBD.

===== 13 September =====
Australian Greens Senator David Shoebridge greeted a small number of protesters at the Spencer St Beidge, which was still barricaded by police while also speaking to media. He criticised Victoria Police’s excessive use of force.

==== Reactions to the Melbourne Land Forces Expo protests ====
- Prime Minister of Australia Anthony Albanese condemned protesters for "throwing things at police".
- Chief Commissioner of Victoria Police Shane Patton said of the protests: "They come here to protest against war, so presumably anti-violence, and the only way I can describe them is a bunch of hypocrites. Their conduct today was absolutely appalling."
- Victorian Greens Leader Ellen Sandell called for an inquiry into excessive force used by police.

== See also ==
- List of pro-Palestinian protests in Australia
