= List of pro-Palestinian protests in Australia =

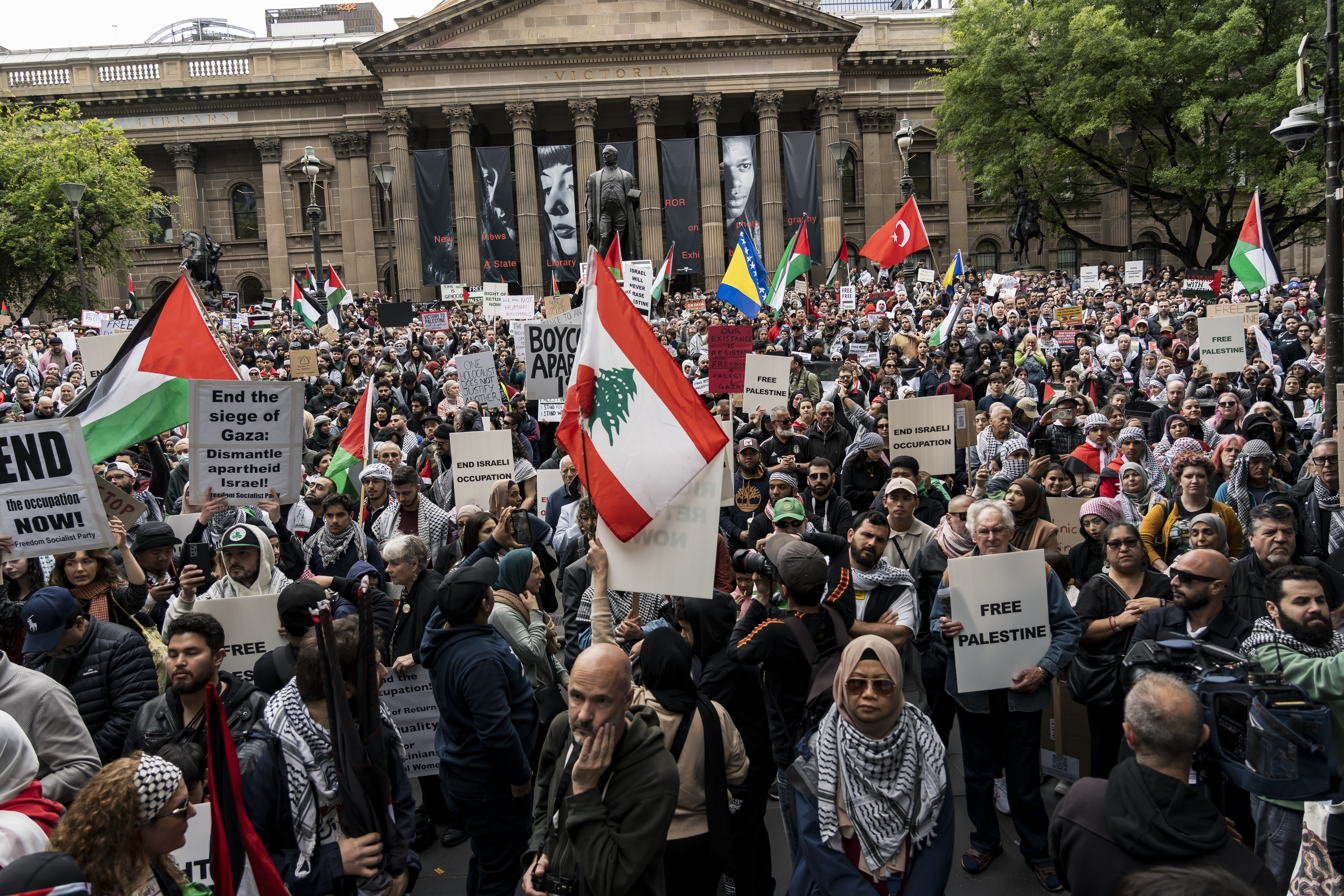
Demonstration in Melbourne, 15 October 2023.

This is a list of pro-Palestinian protests in Australia including demonstrations, marches, sit-ins, direct actions, and campus encampments in support of Palestinian rights.

== List ==
Estimated attendance is either mentioned explicitly in the references or a midpoint is used, i.e., 50 when dozens are mentioned, 500 when hundreds are mentioned, and so on.

=== Pre-2023 ===
Date	City/town	Estimated attendance	Description	Ref(s)
4 January 2009	Sydney	2,000	Demonstration in the city center in protest of Israel's attacks on Gaza.	
4 January 2009	Melbourne	3,000	Demonstration in the city center in protest of Israel's attacks on Gaza. About 500 pro-Israeli counter-protesters were present at a distance.	
19 March 2010	Melbourne	500	Demonstration and march through the city center in protest of Israel's latest attacks on Gaza.	
1 July 2011	Melbourne	19	Demonstration outside the Max Brenner chocolate shop in Queen Victoria Square calling for a boycott of Israeli companies. Ended with police intervention. Nineteen protesters were arrested.	
15 May 2021	Sydney	4,000	Demonstration and march the city center during Nakba Day.	
22 May 2021	Melbourne	?	Demonstration outside the Town Hall.	

=== 2023 ===
Date	City/town	Estimated attendance	Description	Ref(s)
9 October 2023	Sydney	1,000	Demonstration to call on the Australian government to end support to Israel and march through the city's central business district towards the Sydney Opera House, which had been lit up with the colors of the Israeli flag to create a space "for Jews to mourn victims of the attacks in Israel". A small group lit flares and burned Israeli flags.	
15 October 2023	Sydney	6,000	Demonstration at Hyde Park.	
15 October 2023	Melbourne	10,000	Demonstration outside the State Library of Victoria.	
20 October 2023	Alice Springs	?	Blocking of the entryway to the US spy base in Pine Gap, Northern Territory, calling for a ceasefire in Gaza. Ended with police intervention. One protester was arrested.	
31 October 2023	Victoria	50	Occupation of the Defence Minister Richard Marles' office in Geelong by Jewish activists demanding an end to military support for Israel.	
8 November 2023	Melbourne	?	Blocking of a road to the Port of Melbourne to block cargo headed for Israel.	
10 November 2023	Melbourne	200	Demonstration after a Palestinian-owned fast food restaurant was burned down. About 200 pro-Israel counter-protesters were also present and there were some clashes.	
12 November 2023	Brisbane	?	Demonstration and march in the city center.	
12 November 2023	Melbourne	?	Demonstration and march in the city center.	
12 November 2023	Sydney	?	Demonstration and march in the city center.	
21 November 2023	Sydney	400	Blocking of the Port Botany to protest against the unloading of an Israeli-owned shipping company vessel. Ended with police intervention. 23 protesters were arrested.	
23 November 2023	Adelaide	?	School strike and demonstration outside Adelaide's parliament house.	
23 November 2023	Melbourne	1,000	School strike and sit-in at the Melbourne Central mall.	
24 November 2023	Brisbane	?	School walkout.	
24 November 2023	Byron Bay	?	School walkout.	
24 November 2023	Sydney	?	School walkout.	
24 November 2023	Wollongong	?	School walkout.	
26 November 2023	Melbourne	5,000	Demonstration in the city center. Senator Lidia Thorpe stated that Aboriginal Australians were sympathetic to the struggles of Palestinians.	
30 December 2023	Melbourne	?	Die-in outside the offices of the newspaper The Age.	

=== 2024 ===
Date	City/town	Estimated attendance	Description	Ref(s)
22 January 2024	Melbourne	50	Blocking of an Israeli cargo ship from entering the Port of Melbourne. Ended with police intervention, including use of pepper spray, with around 200 police officers being deployed. A dozen of protesters were arrested.	
2 February 2024	Melbourne	?	Blocking of the entrance to a factory producing parts for Israel's F-35 military jets.	
23 April 2024	Sydney	100	Encampment at the University of Sydney. Lasted until 17 June, with protesters disbanding on their own.	
25 April 2024	Melbourne	?	Encampment at the University of Melbourne. There were several disruptions from pro-Israeli counter-protesters. Lasted until 22 May, with protesters disbanding on their own after the university agreed to disclose connections to weapons manufacturers.	
29 April 2024	Canberra	?	Encampment at the Australian National University. One protest organizer was expelled. Lasted until 28 May, with protesters disbanding on their own after threats of police intervention.	
29 April 2024	Brisbane	100	Encampment at the University of Queensland. Lasted until 1 June, with protesters disbanding on their own after the university agreed to disclose ties to Israel and increase humanitarian scholarships for students affected by the war.	
1 May 2024	Melbourne	?	Encampment at Monash University. There were several disruptions from pro-Israeli counter-protesters. Lasted until 17 May, with protesters disbanding on their own.	
1 May 2024	Adelaide	?	Encampment at the University of Adelaide. Lasted until 28 May, with protesters disbanding on their own.	
8 May 2024	Western Australia	50	Protest outside the Crown Perth casino and resort, where Prime Minister Anthony Albanese was speaking at a business breakfast. Ended with police intervention. Greens senator Dorinda Cox alleged she was "manhandled" by police while protesting, saying that the police told her group to move and allegedly shoved her into the crowd while she was speaking.	
18 May 2024	Melbourne	?	Disruption at Melbourne's Moonee Valley Racecourse, which was hosting the Victorian Labor Party's State Conference. The protest action delayed planned speeches by Albanese and Premier of Victoria Jacinta Allan.	
19 May 2024	Melbourne	5,000	Protest outside the Victorian state parliament. Pro-Israeli counter-protesters were also present and there were clashes between the two groups. Ended with police intervention. Six protesters were arrested.	
4 July 2024	Canberra	4	Four pro-Palestine protestors climbed up the roof of the Parliament House for an hour before being arrested by police soon after.	
11 September 2024	Melbourne	1,500	Protest outside the Land Forces Expo, a military technology event. Ended with police intervention. Victoria Police claimed it was the largest deployment of police against a protest since 2000. 42 protesters were arrested.	
31 December 2024	Melbourne	?	Demonstration at the Central Business District. During the demonstration, protesters entered a Starbucks café on Swanston Street, allegedly spitting at staff members and stealing merchandise.	

=== 2025 ===
Date	City/town	Estimated attendance	Description	Ref(s)
18 May 2025	Sydney	?	Demonstration and march in the city center during Nakba Day.	
18 May 2025	Adelaide	200	Demonstration and march in the city to remember the Nakba.	
18 May 2025	Brisbane	300	Demonstration and march in the city to remember the Nakba.	
18 May 2025	Melbourne	5,000	Demonstration and march in the city to remember the Nakba.	
27 June 2025	Sydney	60	Protest outside a manufacturing facility in Belmore. Ended with police intervention. Multiple protesters were injured by police, including former Greens candidate Hannah Thomas who was severely injured in the eye.	
27–28 July 2025	Wollongong	200	First overnight hour picket of arms company Bisalloy Steel.	
3 August 2025	Sydney	225,000–300,000	Sydney Harbour Bridge protest.	
24 August 2025	Multiple	350,000	Over 40 pro-Palestinian rallies in multiple cities. These were organized shortly after Israeli prime minister Benjamin Netanyahu escalating his personal attacks on Australian prime minister Anthony Albanese over the government's decision this month to recognize a Palestinian state.	
19 September 2025	Wollongong	500	24 hour picket of arms company Bisalloy Steel.	
9 October 2025	Northern Territory	?	Several pro-Palestine protestors blocked 800 Australian and US contractors from entering Pine Gap, after activists stated that the base played a key role of assisting Israel's actions in Gaza.	
12 October 2025	Perth	?	Demonstration in the city center.	
12 October 2025	Hobart	?	Demonstration in the city center.	
12 October 2025	Darwin	100	Demonstration in the city center.	
12 October 2025	Coffs Harbour	220	Demonstration at Coffs Harbour jetty.	
12 October 2025	Canberra	300	Demonstration and march in the city center.	
12 October 2025	Melbourne	500	Demonstration and march in the city center.	
12 October 2025	Brisbane	1,000	Demonstration and march in the city center.	
12 October 2025	Adelaide	5,000	Demonstration at the Central Business District.	
12 October 2025	Sydney	8,000–10,000	Demonstration despite a prohibition order preventing the march towards the Opera House. Protesters criticized the ongoing Israeli occupation of Gaza and the West Bank despite a ceasefire coming into effect two days earlier.	
7 December 2025	Wollongong	500	March across Sea Cliff Bridge from Coalcliff to Clifton.	

=== 2026 ===
Date	City/town	Estimated attendance	Description	Ref(s)
9 February 2026	Melbourne	5,000	Demonstration outside of Flinders Street Railway Station with the protestors demanded an end to Israel's occupation of Palestinian territory and against Isaac Herzog's visit to Australia.	
11–13 February 2026	Wollongong	500	A two-day picket organized by Wollongong Friends of Palestine in front of Bisalloy Steels' Unanderra site to protest the company's steel exports to Israel.	
12 February 2026	Sydney	5,000	Demonstration around Sydney Town Hall in protest of Israeli President Isaac Herzog's visit. Ended with police violence, including use of pepper spray, punching protesters, and forcibly removing a group of Muslim protesters while they were praying on the ground. 27 protesters were arrested.	
12 February 2026	Melbourne	5,000	March through Melbourne's CBD to the Parliament of Victoria in protest of Israeli President Isaac Herzog's visit.	
18 April 2026	Brisbane	100+	Hundreds of pro-Palestine demonstrators gathered near the Supreme Court to protest against Queensland's hate speech laws. Police later arrested 20 people after chanting the banned phrase "from the river to the sea".	
17 May 2026	Melbourne	500	March from the State Library to Flinders Street railway station to commemorate Nakba Day.	
26 May 2026	Canberra	50–80	Demonstrators staged a protest at the Parliament House in Canberra, with the protestors knelt on the floor with hands behind the back to replicate the detained members of the Global Sumud Flotilla that were held by Israel.	
14–17 June 2026	Wollongong	1,000	72 hour picket of arms company Bisalloy Steel. One protester was arrested.	

== See also ==
- Gaza war protests
- Boycott, Divestment, and Sanctions
- Lists of pro-Palestinian protests
