= Australia–Israel relations =

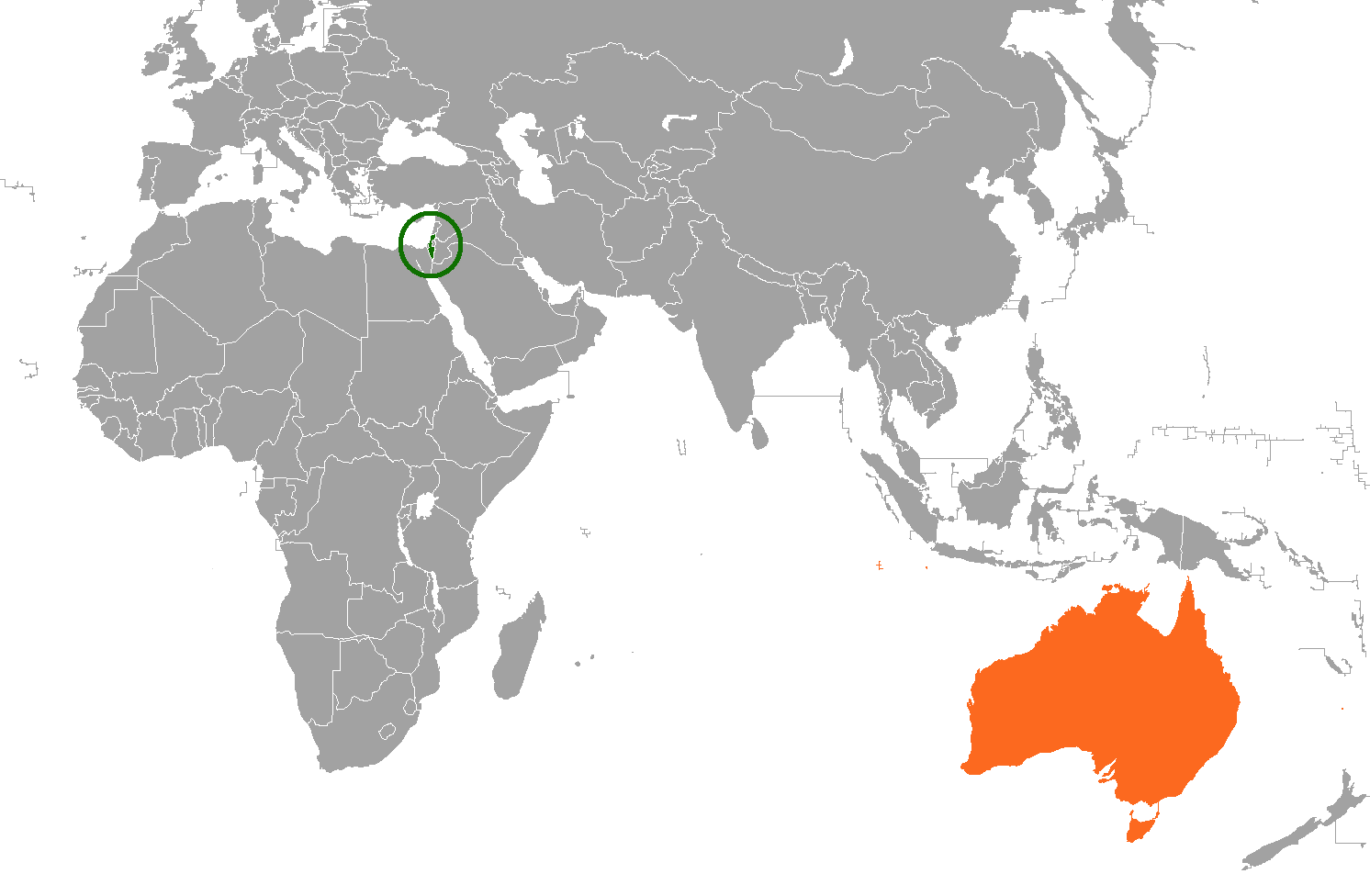

- Israel: Australia

Diplomatic mission
- Israeli Embassy, Canberra: Australian Embassy, Tel Aviv

Envoy
- Ambassador Hillel Newman: Ambassador Neil Hawkins

Diplomatic relations between Australia and Israel were formally established in 1949. Australia has an embassy in Tel Aviv and Israel has an embassy in Canberra. They are two of the most economically developed countries bordering the Indian Ocean or its marginal seas, and are both members of the Organisation for Economic Co-operation and Development (OECD). The two countries have healthy trading relations, with Israel being Australia's 49th largest two-way trading partner and 56th largest export market.

== History ==
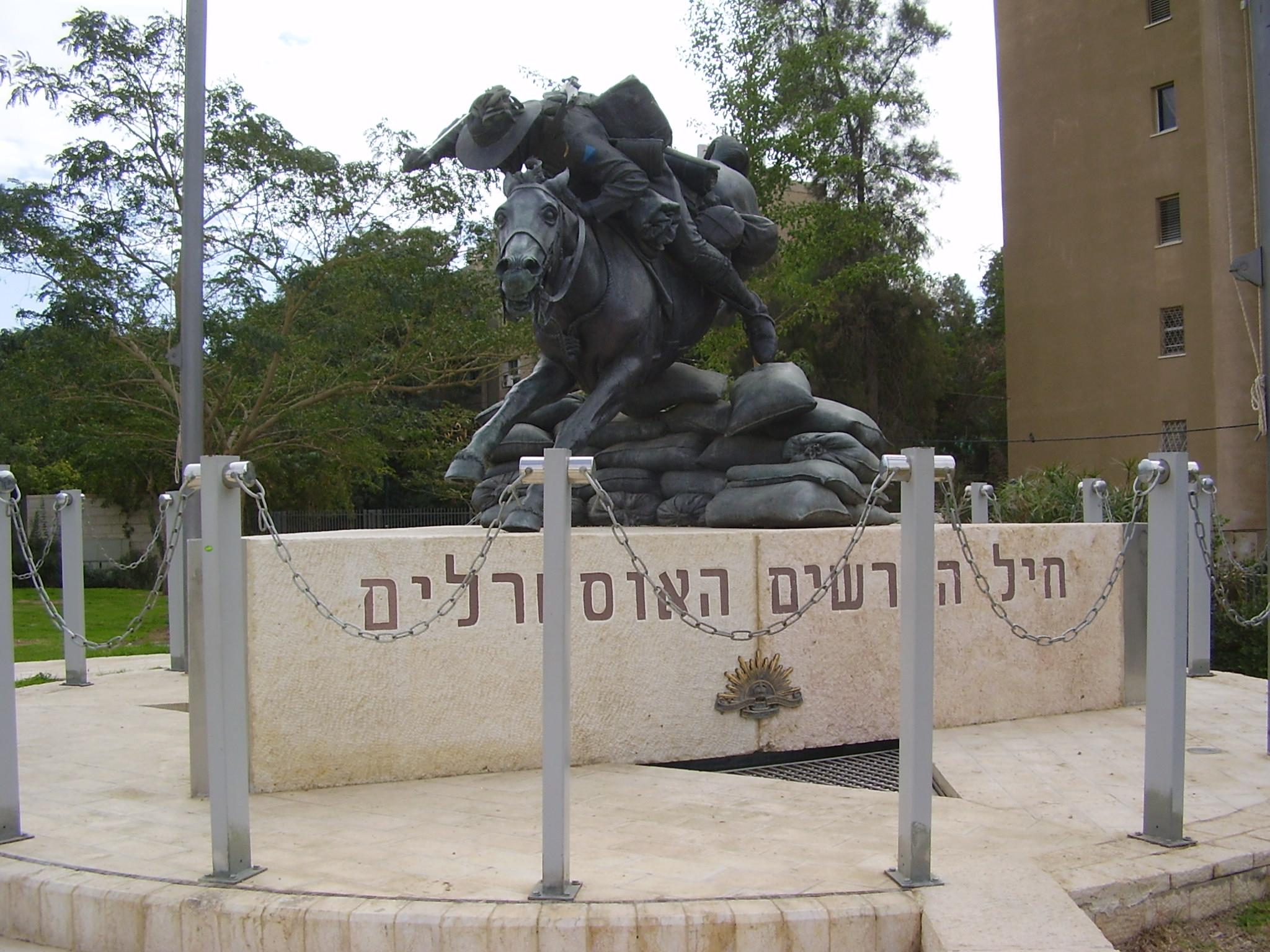
Australian Light Horse Monument, Beersheba

=== World War One ===
Four Australian Light Horse brigades and a battalion of camel troops took part in the Sinai and Palestine campaign of 1916–1917."Light Horse in the Middle East". Australian War Memorial."Imperial Camel Corps". Australian War Memorial."Mounted Troops". The AIF Project. Australian Defence Force Academy. Australian and New Zealand Army Corps (ANZACs) fought for the British Empire against the Turkish ruled Ottoman Empire, most Bedouine and other Arabs remained neutral, but a few had sided with the Turks. On 10 December 1918, Anzac soldiers massacred 40 Arab men in Surafend, the area now known as Tzrifin. The massacre, by soldiers from Australia, New Zealand, and Scotland was in response to the murder of one soldier from New Zealand. The village was rebuilt by the British Army, and the costs were paid by New Zealand and Australia.

=== World War Two ===
During World War II, many Australian units were based, at various times, in the Sinai. It was from there that Australian and other Commonwealth forces launched the Syria-Lebanon campaign of 1941.

The Australian foreign minister H.V. Evatt served as Chairman of the UN General Assembly's Ad Hoc Committee on Palestine and helped to push through the UN Partition Plan on 29 November 1947. Australia was the first country to vote in favour of the plan despite heavy pressure from the United Kingdom on its fellow Commonwealth nations to abstain on the resolution.

== Relations since 28 January 1949 ==
Monthly value (A$ millions) of Australian merchandise exports to Israel since 1988

Monthly value of Israeli merchandise exports to Australia (A$ millions) since 1988

=== Late 20th century (1949 to 1999) ===
Israel and Australia have had diplomatic relations since the Australian government of Ben Chifley recognised Israel on 28 January 1949.

The Liberal–Country Party Coalition supported Israel during and after the 1967 Six-Day War. However, the subsequent Labor government led by Gough Whitlam, elected in 1972, shifted to what was described as a more "even-handed" approach to relations. The change came after the Yom Kippur War of 1973, and was linked with Whitlam's desire to be on friendlier terms with Arab countries.

The subsequent Liberal government led by Malcolm Fraser, elected in 1975, expressed "support for United Nations Security Council Resolutions 242, 338 and 339 as providing the basis for a peaceful settlement". Fraser later said that Australia should "make more plain our commitment to the survival of Israel". In 1980, Andrew Peacock, then Minister for Foreign Affairs, said that "peace should be based ... upon Israel's rights to exist within secure and recognised boundaries; and upon recognition of the legitimate rights of the Palestinian people to a homeland alongside Israel". Peacock's statement was echoed by Fraser in 1982, who said "the legitimate rights of the Palestinians include a homeland alongside Israel".

In the 1980s, Prime Minister Bob Hawke opposed UN Resolution 3379, which designated Zionism as a form of racism, labelling it a "blatant distortion of the truth". Australia had voted against the resolution's adoption in 1975, and sponsored its revocation in 1991.

==== Israel annexations and 1982 Lebanon war ====
In the early 1980s, Australia's Minister for Foreign Affairs, Tony Street, criticised Israeli's Jerusalem Law and Golan Heights Law. When Israel invaded Lebanon in 1982, Australian Prime Minister Malcolm Fraser said Israel's actions were "of the gravest concern to the Australian Government and people", and were "short sighted and foolish".

=== Early 21st century ===
Ties with Israel were strengthened under Prime Minister John Howard and Foreign Minister Alexander Downer, who supported Israel in the 2006 Lebanon War. While relations between the two countries were often shaped by the Israeli–Palestinian conflict, Howard stated that Australia's capacity to influence events within the region was limited and should not be overstated.

==== 2010 Gaza flotilla raid ====
Tension rose again after the 2010 Gaza flotilla raid, in which an Australian citizen was injured. Prime Minister Kevin Rudd condemned Israel's actions.

==== Israeli espionage operations ====
In May 2010, the Australian government expelled an Israeli diplomat over the use of Australian passports forged by the Israeli government which were used in the assassination of Mahmoud Al-Mabhouh. Foreign Minister Stephen Smith said that Israel had forged Australian passports previously, and while "Australia remains a firm friend of Israel ... our relationship must be conducted on the basis of mutual trust and respect".

In 2013, the ABC reported that a dual Australian-Israeli citizen, Ben Zygier, had died in Israeli custody in 2010. The ABC reported that Zygier, who had worked for Israeli security agency, Mossad, had been imprisoned after unintentionally sabotaging a spy operation dedicated to repatriating the bodies of Israeli soldiers killed during the Israel-Lebanon war of the 1980s. This story reignited discussion about the potential for conflicts arising from dual citizenship in general, and about Jewish Australians' relationships to Israel.

==== 2014 to 2018 ====
A 2014 BBC World Service opinion poll found that 67% of Australians had a negative view of Israel's influence and 24% had a positive view. However, Israel was viewed less negatively than in the 2007 survey. Of the countries surveyed, only Indonesia and the UK had a greater proportion of their population view Israel negatively. No similar survey was conducted to ascertain Israeli perceptions of Australia.

In December 2016, Foreign Minister Julie Bishop openly distanced Australia from the United States in response to their abstention regarding UNSC Resolution 2334, suggesting that Australia would have voted against the resolution had it been in the Security Council. Australia was the only nation to have spoken out against the resolution besides Israel.

In February 2017, Prime Minister Benjamin Netanyahu became the first incumbent Israeli leader to visit Australia. Netanyahu met with the Prime Minister Malcolm Turnbull, Governor-General Sir Peter Cosgrove and other state and federal politicians.

In May 2018, Australia's ambassador to Israel, Chris Cannan, along with other diplomats from other countries, did not attend the opening of the new United States embassy in Jerusalem.

In October 2018, Australian prime minister Scott Morrison announced Australia was reviewing whether to move Australia's embassy in Israel from Tel Aviv to Jerusalem, and recognizing Jerusalem as the capital of Israel. In December 2018, Morrison announced Australia has recognised West Jerusalem as the capital of Israel but will not immediately move its embassy from Tel Aviv.

==== October 2022 to September 2023 ====
In October 2022, Australia reversed the previous government's decision and stated it would no longer recognise West Jerusalem as Israel's capital. Foreign Minister Penny Wong reaffirmed that Jerusalem's status should be decided through peace negotiations between Israelis and Palestinians.

Prime Minister Anthony Albanese has openly condemned the Boycott, Divestment and Sanctions (BDS) movement.

=== Gaza War ===
In August 2023, Wong reinstated the previous policy that had been in place up to 2014. Australia would once again refer to the West Bank, East Jerusalem and Gaza as "Occupied Palestinian Territories" and to Israeli settlements there as "illegal". The foreign affairs minister of Australia has stated that the country has not given weapons to Israel since the start of the Gaza war. In December 2024, Australia split with the United States and voted with 156 other countries at the United Nations to end Israel's "unlawful presence" in the occupied Palestinian territories.

In the wake of the 2024 Melbourne synagogue attack, Israeli Prime Minister, Benjamin Netanyahu, linked the above UN resolution with the attack. He was quoted as saying, "“It is impossible to separate the reprehensible arson attack from the federal government’s extreme anti-Israeli position". On 21 November 2024, the International Criminal Court (ICC) issued arrest warrants for Israel's Prime Minister Benjamin Netanyahu, Defense Minister Yoav Gallant, and Hamas military commander Mohammed Deif (later confirmed killed). In response, Foreign Minister Penny Wong stated on X that the Australian government "respects the independence of the ICC and its important role in upholding international law".

In May 2025, Prime Minister Albanese echoed criticisms from other nations, urging Israel allow the supply of humanitarian aid into the Gaza Strip, describing Israel's actions as "completely unacceptable" and an "outrage". On 16 May, following the announcement of Israeli military operation in Gaza, Foreign Minister Wong stated that Israel "cannot allow the suffering to continue" and condemned the "abhorrent and outrageous comments made by members of the Netanyahu Government about these people in crisis." Albanese opposed sanctions against Israel over the blockade of Gaza, saying his focus was on "peace and security for both Israelis and Palestinians" rather than "soundbites". On 11 June, Australia joined New Zealand, Canada, the United Kingdom and Norway in banning and freezing the assets of two far-right Israeli government ministers Itamar Ben-Gvir and Bezalel Smotrich, for allegedly advocating violence and the displacement of Palestinians.

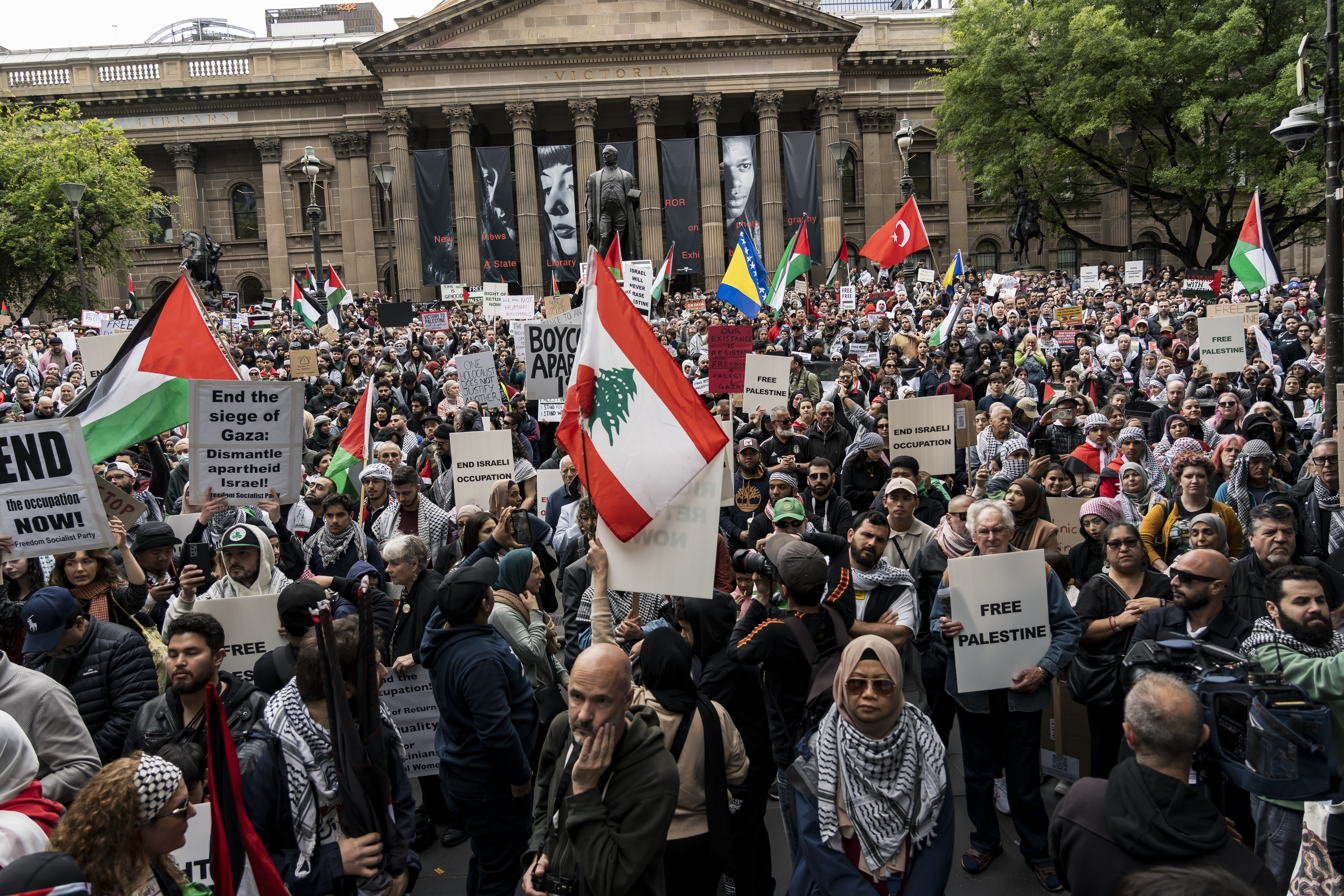
Pro-Palestine protest in Melbourne during the Gaza war, 14 October 2023

Australia announced sanctions on November 18, 2026, targeting three Israelis and four groups. The reason was settlement expansion in the occupied West Bank and violence by settlers. According to Australian Foreign Minister Penny Wong, those blacklisted helped create new settlements. Their work included raising money, finding volunteers, and backing violent settlers. Wong also condemned recent violence around the E1 settlement project. That project, she warned, would split Palestinian land in two, cut it off from East Jerusalem, and damage any hope of a two-state solution. The sanctions prevent Australians and Australian companies from dealing with the listed people and groups. They can't offer them any kind of support either.

==== Controversies ====
In June 2024, The Guardian reported that the Australian Border Force had questioned three Australian nationals suspected of planning to travel to Israel to serve in the Israeli Defense Force (IDF). The Australian government also issued a warning for Australians planning to serve in foreign militaries "to carefully consider their legal obligations and ensure their conduct does not constitute a criminal offence." In mid-December 2024, the Jerusalem Post and Middle East Eye reported that Israeli nationals intending to enter Australia on visitor visas were asked to complete lengthy questionnaires regarding their military service in the IDF and involvement in human rights abuses, war crimes and genocide during the Gaza war. This led to two Israeli siblings, intending to attend a family function in Australia, having their visa applications delayed. In response, the Zionist Federation of Australia sought clarification from the Australian government on whether visa requirements for Israeli nationals had changed.

In August 2025, the Greens urged the Albanese government to impose direct sanctions on high-ranking members of Netanyahu's government and to stop supplying parts for F-35 fighter jets to the global supply chain that can be accessed by Israel. Greens senator David Shoebridge said: "If the Albanese government stopped the export of F-35 fighter jet parts to Israel, then their F-35 fleet would be grounded." According to Amnesty International, by participating in the production of the F-35, Australia has violated the Arms Trade Treaty (ATT).

=== Australian recognition of the State of Palestine ===
On 30 July 2025, the Australian government joined 15 other countries including France, Canada and New Zealand in signing the "New York Call" which proposed recognising Palestinian statehood at the United Nations General Assembly in September 2025. This announcement was criticised by both the US and Israeli governments for allegedly "rewarding" Hamas' terrorism. On 9 August, Wong joined her German, Italian, New Zealand and British counterparts in issuing a joint statement condemning Netanyahu's plan to militarily occupy Gaza City. That same day, Albanese and New Zealand Prime Minister Christopher Luxon called for a ceasefire in Gaza and opposed Israeli plans to occupy Gaza City.

On 11 August 2025, Anthony Albanese announced that Australia would formally recognise a Palestinian state at the United Nations General Assembly in September of that year. This was contingent on a number of assurances by the Palestinian Authority, including commitments to recognise Israel's right to exist, demilitarise, and hold general elections. Albanese justified his decision by asserting that "a two-state solution is humanity’s best hope to break the cycle of violence in the Middle East and to bring an end to the conflict, suffering and starvation in Gaza". He cited decades of failures at establishing a two-state consensus between Israelis and Palestinians as providing an impetus for Palestinian recognition, stating that "the risk of trying is nothing compared to the danger of letting this moment pass us by". Penny Wong also sought to justify the decision, arguing that it had been over 77 years since the world promised a Palestinian state and that "we can’t keep waiting for the end of a peace process that has ground to a halt". Benjamin Netanyahu roundly criticised the decision, suggesting that Australia and other nations were "delusional" for thinking that recognition of a Palestinian state would bring peace to the region. Israel's ambassador to Australia, Amir Maimon, also criticised Albanese's decision, suggesting it would "[elevate] the position of Hamas". The move was further condemned by Australia's opposition leader, Sussan Ley, who accused Albanese of breaking with the longstanding bipartisan position that recognition should only come at the end of a negotiated peace settlement.

On 19 August 2025, following a series of diplomatic moves, Netanyahu’s office released a statement on social media accusing Albanese of being a "weak politician who betrayed Israel and abandoned Australia’s Jews". Earlier, Israel's Foreign Minister Gideon Sa’ar had revoked the visas of Australia's representatives to the Palestinian Authority, in response to the Australian government's decision to cancel the visa of far-right Knesset member Simcha Rothman. Netanyahu's comments were criticised domestically by Israeli opposition leader Yair Lapid, who described him as "the most politically toxic leader in the Western world". In Australia, opposition leader Sussan Ley placed responsibility on Albanese, accusing him of mismanaging the country's international relationships.

=== 2025 Bondi beach shooting and aftermath ===
On 14 December 2025, sixteen people were shot dead at a Hanukka celebration at Bondi Beach, in East Sydney. The gunmen were allegedly a 24-year-old Australian-born ISIS-sympathiser and his father. The older gunman was shot dead by NSW police. The other 15 people killed were mostly Jewish Australians. One Israeli-Australia dual citizen was killed.

Hebrew language media reported that the Israeli dual citizen was the Rabbi who organised the event. Israeli news reported، that "Rabbi Shlanger, a holder of Israeli and Australian citizenship, has served as a shlich in Sydney since 2008. He has been involved in commemorating the victims of the October 7 massacre around the world. In recent months, he has visited Israel and encouraged many soldiers".

The French victim was buried in Ashdod, Israel. Israeli news agency Ynet reported that he had attempted to save the youngest victim, Matilda, by shielding her with his own body.

Following the 2025 Bondi Beach shooting on 15 December, Netanyahu publicly attributed responsibility to Albanese, citing his recognition of a Palestinian state. Albanese disagreed with Netanyahu's remarks, noting that most of the international community supported a two-state solution to the Israel-Palestine conflict. Netanyahu also praised Ahmed al Ahmed, a bystander who disarmed one of the shooters, describing him as "brave Muslim" and commending his actions.

Prime minister Benjamin Netanyahu spoke about the attack on Sunday 14 December Israeli time (Monday AEDT). Netanyahu delivered a speech from a government meeting at Dimona. Netanyahu attacked prime minister Albanese and called antisemitism a "cancer". In what The Times of Israel called "an oblique attack on the Australian government" Netanyahu said, "...We will continue to demand from them to do what is demanded of leaders of free nations. We will not give up, we will not bow our heads, we will continue to fight as our ancestors did".

Soon after the attack, pro-Israel outlets pointed out that Israel had warned Australia about possible attacks from the Islamic Republic of Iran. The following day, the Australian Financial Review said Mossad was "helping" ASIO, despite the previous misdirection.

Writing in Haaretz, Dana Segall said that progressive reactions to the attack failed to acknowledge and emphasise its antisemitic nature, "dilut[ing] Jewish victimhood into a vague slurry of 'violence,' 'tragedy,' and 'shared humanity'."

==== Threats and accusations about recognition of the State of Palestine ====
The attack was attributed to lone wolf terrorism on behalf of the Islamic State. The Islamic State ideology explicitly opposes the concept of nation states, including the existence of a Palestinian state. Israeli news outlet I24NEWS published a long list of leaders and politicians condemning the Australian government and numerous others, but none condemned ISIS (Hebrew: דאעש, romanized: Daesh).

Australian opposition leader Sussan Ley and other Liberal-National coalition MPs criticised Australia's recognition of Palestine for being linked to the shooting, despite this being directly contrary to the goals of Islamic State – who aspire to be the only Islamic state and reject nation states as a concept – and of no interest to their local supporters.

Israeli prime minister Benjamin Netanyahu blamed the Albanese government for "pouring fuel on this antisemitic fire" as a result of policies such as the recognition of Palestine at the United Nations General Assembly in September 2025. Albanese rejected the accusations, but later expressed his concern regarding some of the language used during pro-Palestine protests. Netanyahu has been pushing a "Hamas is ISIS" slogan since the 2014 Gaza war.

In an interview with Channel 4 News UK, former Australian prime minister Malcolm Turnbull criticised Israeli Prime minister Benjamin Netanyahu for attributing the attack to Australian recognition of the State of Palestine, pointing out that the vast majority of nations recognise the state, and told "Bibi Netanyahu" to "stay out of our politics". Turnbull's remarks to Channel 4 UK were repeated in multiple other news sources.

==== 2026 Israeli presidential visit to Australia ====
On 9 February 2026, Israeli President Isaac Herzog began an official visit to Australia, arriving in Sydney and laying of a wreath at the Bondi Beach memorial site, where he also met survivors and victims' families.

Herzog was able to visit Australia because, unlike Prime Minister Benjamin Netanyahu, Herzog is not the subject of an arrest warrant from the International Criminal Court. However, there were still calls for Herzog to be arrested, and discussion about whether this was possible.

In debates in the Australian Senate before the visit, The Australian Greens said that the president's visit would "inflame community tensions". The visit was also criticised in advance by Ed Husic, a federal member of parliament for the ruling Australian Labor Party.

The Jewish Council of Australia opposed his visit, urging the Australian government to rescind the invitation. According to the Executive Council of Australian Jewry, the visit was intended to "lift the spirits of a pained community", express solidarity with Jewish Australians and recalibrate bilateral ties. His visit was also welcomed by the Zionist Federation of Australia.

United Nations Commissioner Chris Sidoti said the visit should not have happened because Herzog is personally guilty of incitement to genocide, relating to the genocide in Gaza. The visit drew attention to other past actions of Herzog, such as signing bombs that were later dropped in Gaza.

Herzog's visit was met with several protests, including pro-Palestinian demonstrations in Sydney, Melbourne and Brisbane criticizing Israel's actions in Gaza and opposing Herzog's presence. Police used pepper spray on protesters and journalists in Sydney. The Law Enforcement Conduct Commission launched an investigation into the conduct of New South Wales Police Force personnel during the Sydney pro-Palestine protest. A demonstration outside parliament house in Canberra was attended by Greens deputy leader Mehreen Faruqi and joined by independent senator David Pocock.

More than 100 Muslim organisations condemned the actions of NSW Police using disproportionate force against the group of Australian Muslims who were praying near the rally. Aftab Malik, Australia's special envoy to combat Islamophobia, demanded an apology from NSW police for using “excessive and unprovoked” force against a group of Muslim men who conducted impromptu prayers during a protest in Sydney which, according to premier Minns, was in "the middle of a riot".

Prime minister Albanese said that he has spoken to the president about criminal prosecution of the Israel Defense Forces personnel who killed Zomi Frankcom, an Australian aid worker in the Gaza Strip, in Palestine, who was killed by an Israeli airstrike on the World Central Kitchen aid convoy she was travelling in. Zomi's brother, Mal Frankcom, said the family are 'determined to pursue justice and accountability' for his sister's death and the deaths of 6 other aid works killed by the same drone strike.

During his trip, Herzog was also briefed by ASIOs counter-terrorism team about their work following the Bondi shooting. In early March 2026, Foreign Minister Wong acknowledged, when questioned in Parliament, that Herzog had secretly met with the Australian Security Intelligence Organisation's director-general Mike Burgess during his visit to Australia. This information emerged in March 2026 after, Senator Pocock raised concerns on behalf of his constituents (in the Australian Capital Territory), during Question Time. Senator Pocock said, "The stated purpose of this visit was to provide support to Australia's Jewish community. A visit by a foreign head of state to the headquarters of our national security and intelligence agency would, I believe, be unprecedented".

== Tax treaties ==
On 28 March 2019, the governments of Australia and Israel signed the first tax treaty between the two countries, to prevent double taxation and tax avoidance. In 2017–18, total merchandise trade between Australia and Israel was worth over $1 billion, and Israel's investment in Australia in 2017 was $301 million. The treaty entered into force on 1 January 2020 after both countries completed their domestic ratification procedures. In 2013, Australia's Department of Foreign Affairs described Australia and Israel as having "a healthy commercial relationship with two-way trade worth $919 million." In 2015–16, two-way goods and services trade amounted to $1.3 billion, of which Australian exports were worth $349 million and imports from Israel $952 million. In 2015, Australian investment in Israel totalled $663 million and Israeli investment in Australia was $262 million.

== Anzac Day ==
In Israel, Anzac Day is commemorated at the Commonwealth War cemetery on Mount Scopus in Jerusalem. The Australian Soldier Park in Beersheba is dedicated to the memory of the Australian Light Horse regiment, which charged at Beersheba and defeated Ottoman forces during World War I.

Some Australian soldiers are buried in Gaza War Cemetery. While several graves were damaged during the Gaza war, they were reportedly less severely affected than other graves in the Gaza Strip.

== Public opinion ==
According to a 2025 Pew Research Center survey, 25% of people in the Australia had a favorable view of Israel, while 74% had an unfavorable view; 20% had confidence in Israeli Prime Minister Benjamin Netanyahu, while 72% did not.

== See also ==
- History of the Jews in Australia
- International recognition of Israel
- Israeli Australians
- 2024 Melbourne Land Forces Expo protests
