= EzyMart =

Australian convenience store brand

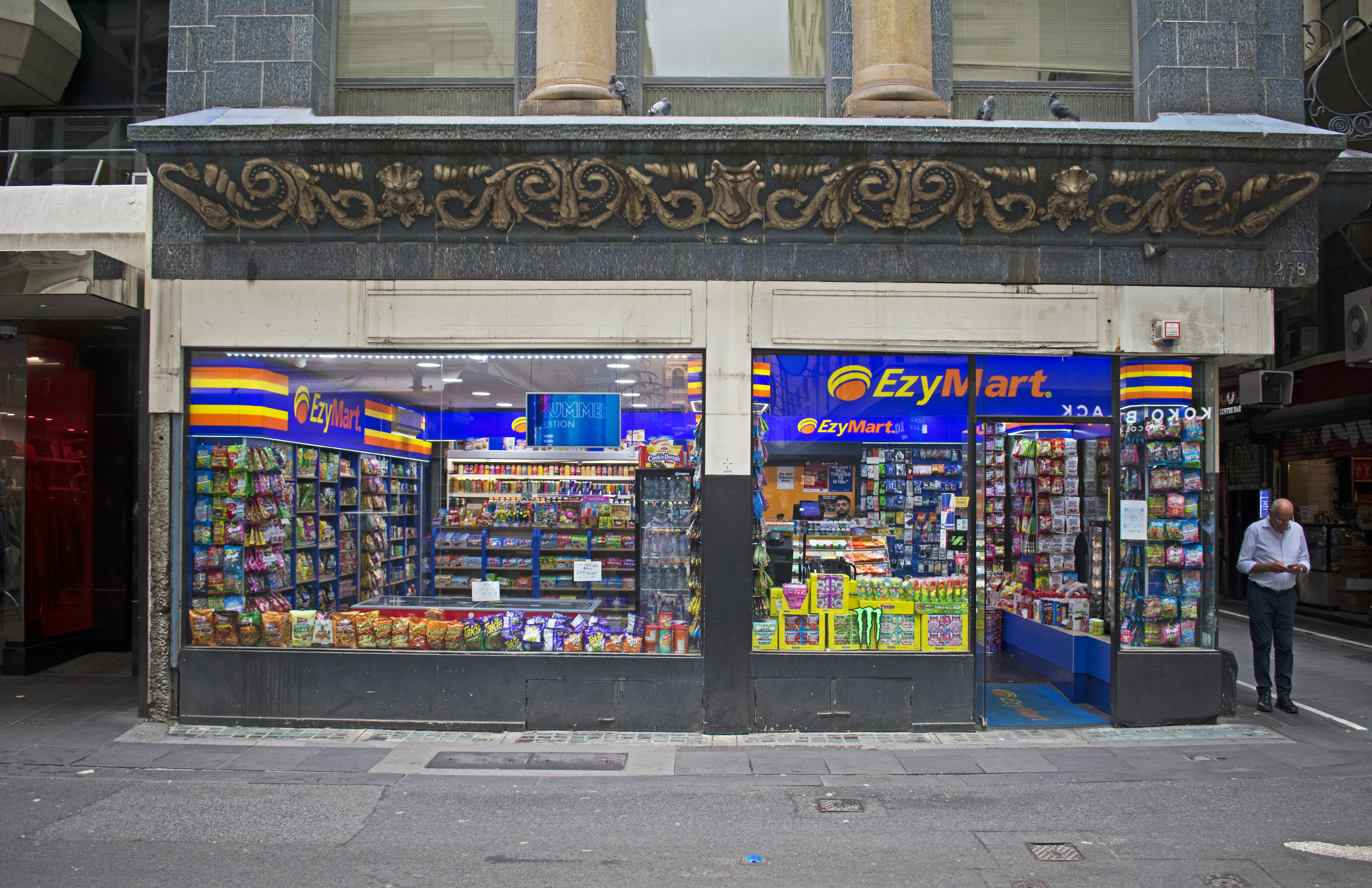
- An EzyMart store along Flinders Lane in Melbourne, Victoria
- Industry: Retail (convenience stores)
- Founded: 2001; 25 years ago
- Founder: Maher Magableh
- Headquarters: Australia
- Number of locations: 490 (2025)
- Key people: Maher Magableh (CEO)
- Website: ezymart.net.au

EzyMart is an Australian convenience store chain. The chain was established in 2001 in Bondi Beach and has 490 stores operating in all Australian states except Western Australia, the Northern Territory and the Australian Capital Territory. Its founder and CEO is Maher Magableh, a Jordanian-Australian businessman and taekwondoin.

== History ==
=== Maher Magableh ===
EzyMart's founder and CEO is Maher Issa Magableh. Magableh lived in a small village north of Amman, capital of Jordan, prior to immigrating to Australia. Since he was 6-years old, Magableh has had a strong passion for taekwondo and represented Jordan in several international events and competitions - first at Belgium when he was 12-years old. He was a part of the Jordanian team at the 1992 Olympics in Barcelona. Although he made plans to compete at the 2000 Olympics in Sydney for Jordan, Magableh ended up settling in the city as a student. His brother and cousins were already studying in Sydney, and Magableh pursued post-graduate studies in business management and public relations.

At the same time as his business ventures, Magableh continued to be active in taekwondo in Australia. He served as a coach for the Australian national team and was certified as an international taekwondo referee where he judged in three Olympics including in 2016 at Rio de Janeiro. He was named the best international referee in 2014 and 2018, and retired from refereeing in 2019. In terms of taekwondo organisations, Magableh is a council member of World Taekwondo where he helped establish a humanitarian wing that teaches taekwondo and English at 11 refugee centres. He is also the director of operations for the Taekwondo Humanitarian Foundation. In 2025, he was elected the President of the Oceania Taekwondo Union. Magableh is also active in Arab organisations in Australia. In 2010 he founded the Jordanian Australian Friendship Association to assist Jordanian students in Australia.

=== Establishment and expansions ===
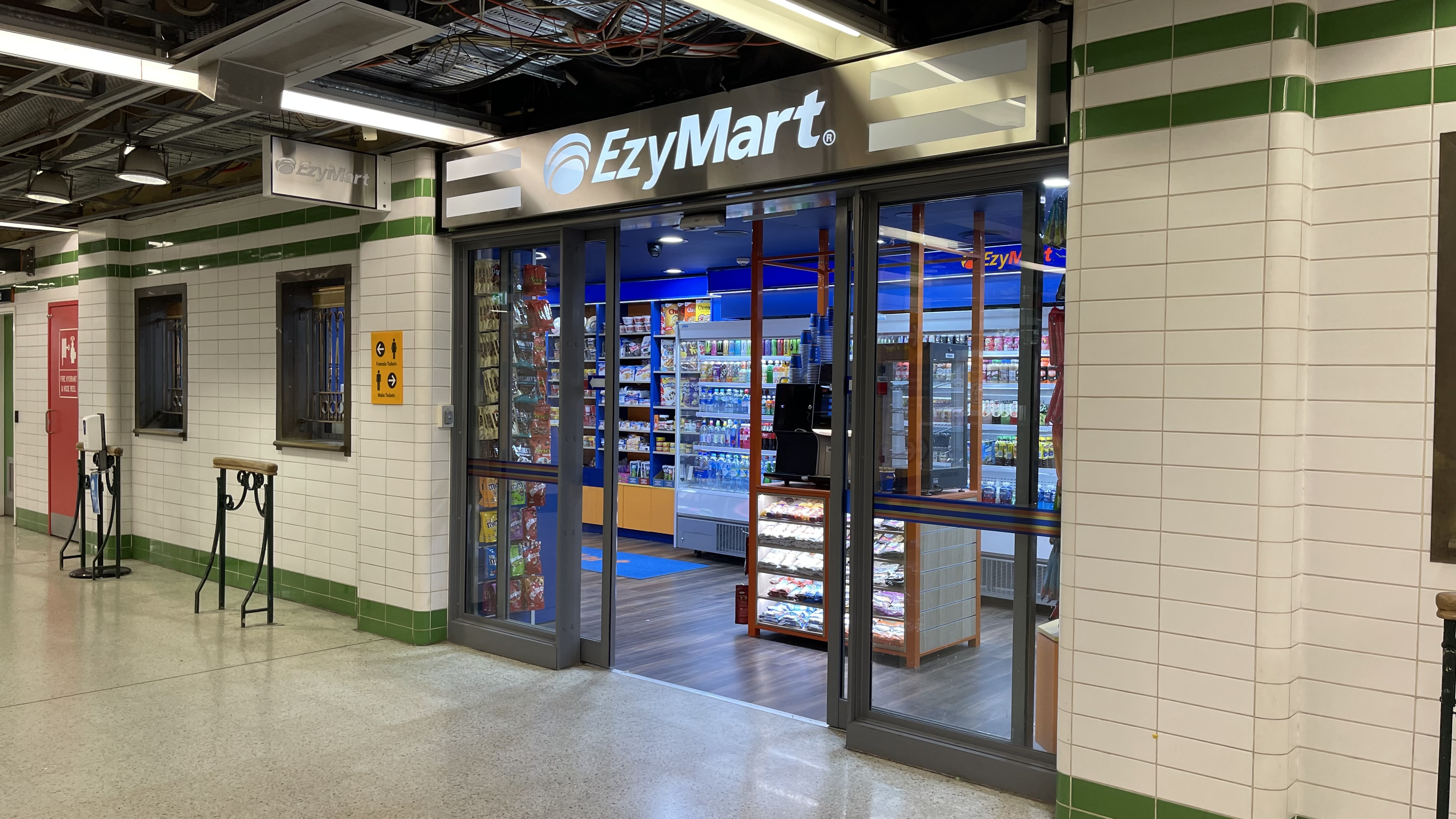
An EzyMart at Central railway station, Sydney.

In 2001, Magableh bought a small milk bar along Bondi Beach he converted into the first EzyMart. To differentiate EzyMart from competitors, Magableh placed an emphasis on importing products from overseas to give Australian customers access to international brands not found in most stores. Goods, such as Hershey's and Reese's chocolate, were imported from the United States, Europe, Middle East and Asia. 2006 saw the chain expand to its second store at Kings Cross, also in Sydney, alongside four other locations around the Sydney CBD and North Shore. At the time, all of Magebleh's stores had different names until a customer prompted him to use a single name. EzyMart was chosen by Magableh's friends and family. His business strategy revolved around turning employees into partners. During the Great Recession in 2007 and 2008 when most businesses were pausing expansions, Magableh continued to expand EzyMart with new stores. By 2013, there were more than 50 stores - 15 owned by Magableh and 36 operated by franchise owners.

== Operations ==
EzyMart currently operates 490 stores in five states (New South Wales, Victoria, Queensland, Tasmania and South Australia, the Northern Territory and the Australian Capital Territory. Together, they employ over 2,000 people. The number of stores has grown from 50 by 2013, more than 180 in 2015,, 369 in 2019, and 450 in 2023. In 2015, a majority of stores were in Sydney as the country began expanding into Melbourne. Its first store in Melbourne was established in 2014 in the CBD, as a result of a partnership with fellow Jordanian-Australian Hash Tayeh. By 2024, Tayeh had opened 25 more stores in Victoria. Still, by 2023, most (about 200 out of 450 stores) were located in Sydney.

EzyMart Distribution, EzyMart's logistics company, supplied around 2,200 stores in Australia in 2025.
