= Hash Tayeh =

Australian businessman and activist (born 1990)

Hasheam Tayeh
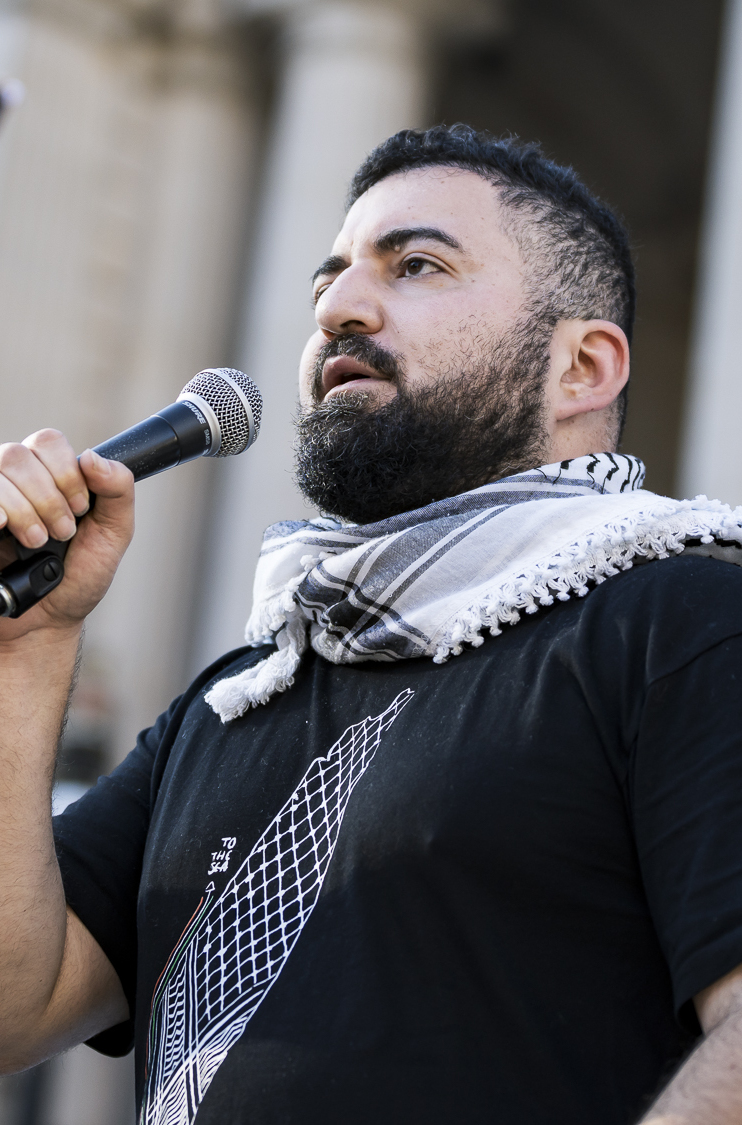
- Tayeh at a rally in Melbourne in May 2024.
- Born: 1990 (age 35–36)
- Education: Qatar Leadership Academy; Victoria University
- Known for: Founder of Burgertory; Pro-Palestine activism

Hasheam Tayeh (born 1990), commonly referred to as Hash Tayeh, is an Australian businessman and pro-Palestine activist from Melbourne. Tayeh is the founder and former chief executive officer of burger restaurant chain Burgertory.

== Early life ==
Tayeh, along with his family, fled the Gulf War in Jordan to Australia when he was two years old. Several years later, he along with his family relocated to Qatar after his dad received a job opportunity. Tayeh was sent to the Qatar Leadership Academy military school. Upon graduating in 2007, Tayeh convinced his parents to send him to visit family in Melbourne, having no intention of returning. He studied banking, finance and international trade at Victoria University and took on multiple jobs to support himself, including working at McDonald's, Luna Park and as a labourer.

== Business career ==
Tayeh founded an electronics company when he was 17 years old and sold it a year later for $200,000. He used that money to start a security company. Two years later he bought a doughnut company which supplied cafes and petrol stations. He sold the doughnut business in 2013 for $1.2 million. A meeting with convenience store chain EzyMart to obtain a wholesale doughnut contract eventually led to Tayeh opening the first EzyMart store in Melbourne and then expanding the chain across Victoria.

In 2017, Tayeh opened a pasta and pizza shop called Mipasto in Footscray. Its popularity led to a second store in Braybrook and the opening of two new concepts at the same shopping centre in 2018—Bean Lab cafe and Burgertory restaurant. By March 2022, Burgertory had expanded to 17 locations and in July that year, it acquired the New York Minute chain and rebranded its 11 stores to Burgertory.

In February 2025, the Australian Taxation Office (ATO) took legal action against Tayeh and issued him with a director penalty notice for more than $1.05 million, alleging 12 companies where Tayeh was formerly a director had not paid the full amount owed in withholding tax on employee wages, GST and superannuation contributions at various times. In April and May 2025, the ATO applied for the winding up of 11 of the companies. Tayeh said "This is not a tax issue, it's a campaign of targeted harassment against me". 12 companies were placed in liquidation. In July 2025, Tayeh resigned as CEO of Burgertory and QSR Collective citing attacks and harassment related to his activism.

== Palestine activism ==
Tayeh came to prominence following the start of the Gaza war for his outspoken support of Palestine, being a regular attendee and an organiser of pro-Palestine rallies in Melbourne.

On 10 November 2023, Tayeh's Burgertory restaurant in the Melbourne suburb of Caulfield was burnt down. Police stated that they did not believe that it was motivated by hate or prejudice. The following night, a rally took place that saw clashes between Israel and Palestine supporters. Tayeh said staff had previously been threatened and told they “worked for a terrorist”. Tayeh attracted criticism online for attending pro-Palestine rallies in the Melbourne CBD amid the ongoing war. Two men were later charged for the arson attack, telling the court that they took orders from “somebody above”. On 8 July 2024, it was revealed that the attackers were paid $20,000 to torch the Burgertory restaurant.

On 13 November 2023, Tayeh moved his wife and young child into a safe house after receiving anonymous death threats on social media. In April 2024, a firebomb was thrown at Tayeh's house while he and his family were sleeping, with Tayeh labelling it either as terrorism or a hate crime.

In May 2024, Tayeh repeatedly chanted "all Zionists are terrorists" at a pro-Palestine rally in Melbourne. Tayeh was notified by police in July 2024 that he would be arrested and interviewed after being accused of inciting hatred of Jewish people. Tayeh handed himself in to police for questioning, but was not charged. At the same time, a rally, organised by Jews Against Fascism, took place outside of Fawkner Police Station and the Coburg North Burgertory restaurant, in support of Tayeh. In March 2025, police charged Tayeh with four counts of “using insulting words in public” for his chants at the May rally. The prosecution initially said the chant branded Jewish Australians as terrorists but later said it would not allege the chant was antisemitic.

Lawyer Menachem Vorchheimer brought a case against Tayeh in the Victorian Civil and Administrative Tribunal (VCAT) for chanting "all Zionists are terrorists" at a rally in March 2025. In February 2026, Tayeh was found to have breach the state's Racial and Religious Tolerance Act for the chants. He intends to appeal the ruling.
