= Australian Soldier Park =

Park in Beersheba, Israel

Coordinates: 31°15′36.03″N 34°46′23.55″E

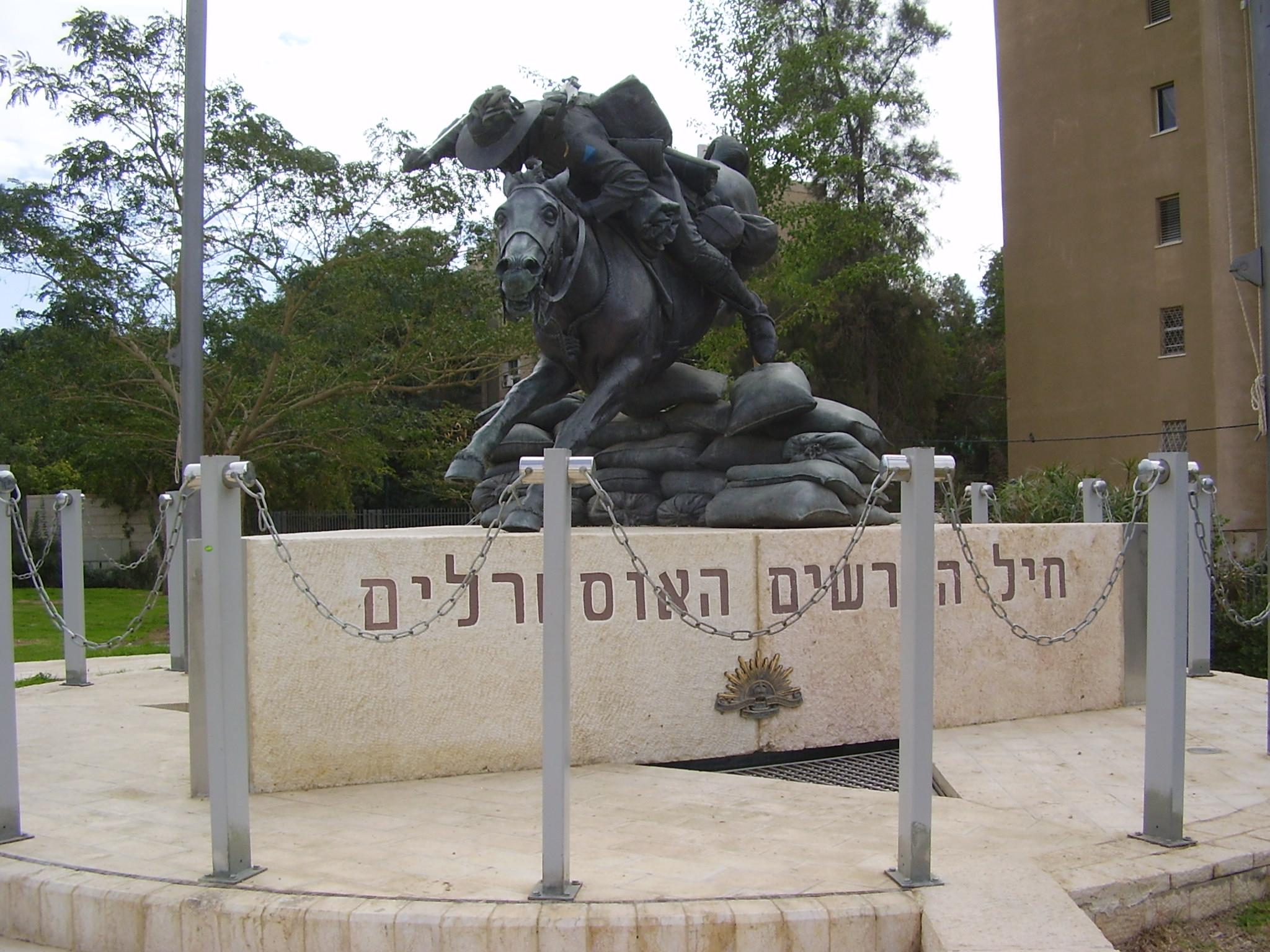
The Australian Light Horse Regiment monument

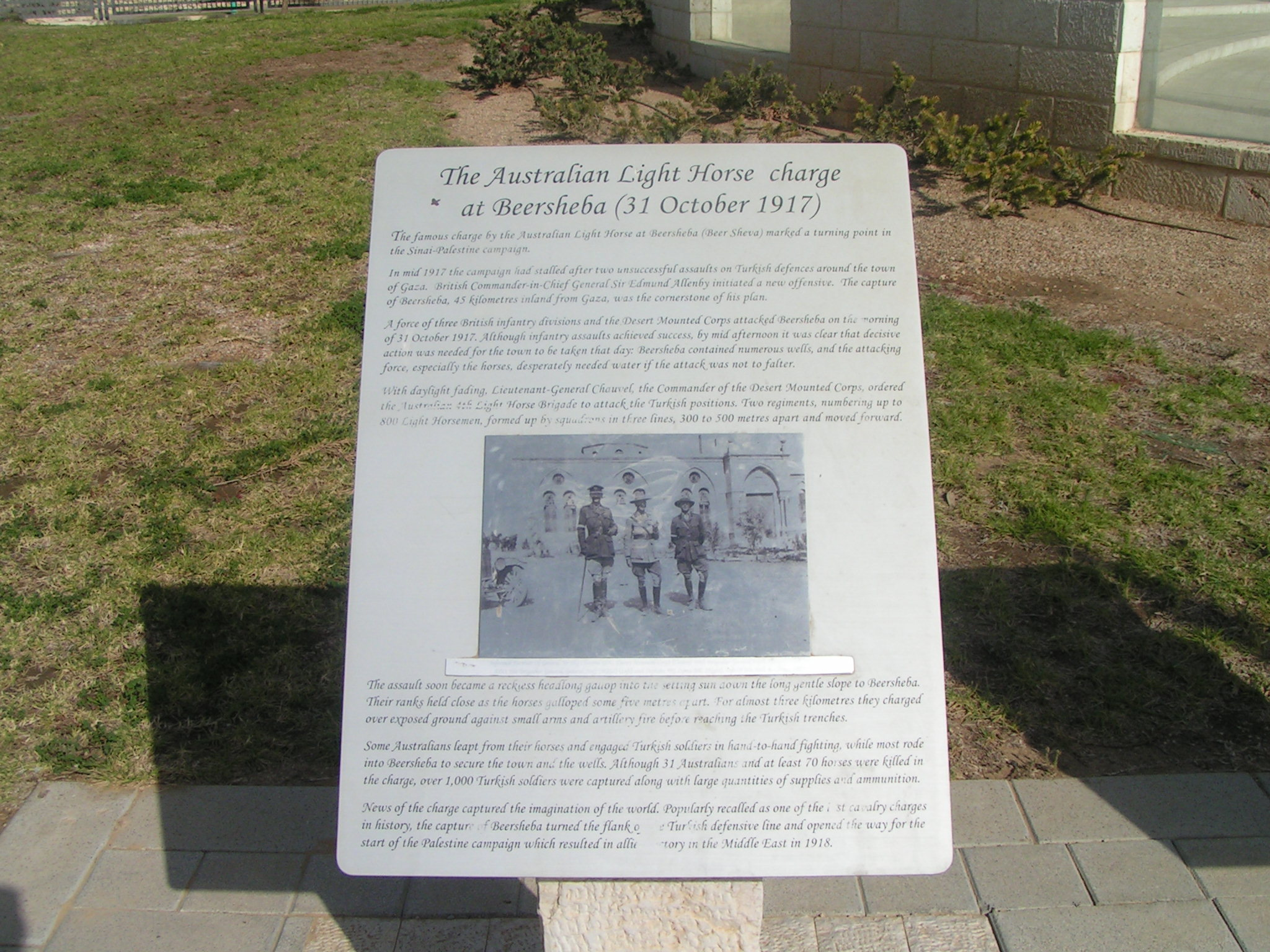
The park commemorates the Australian soldiers who took over Beersheba from the Turks as part of General Allenby's conquest of the Levant in World War I.

The Australian Soldier Park, in Beersheba, Israel is dedicated to the memory of the Australian Light Horse regiments, that captured the town from the Ottoman Empire during World War I.

The park was established in 2008 on a large area, and is maintained by a team of its own employees. On its eastern corner there is a memorial statue of a mounted Australian lighthorseman as well as documentary materiel on aluminum boards, written in three languages. The park also includes an area for picnics, gardens, artificial waterfalls, a maze, and a large playground under a circuses-tent-like shade that protects visitors from the desert sunlight.

Most of the playground facilities are fully accessible for children who use wheelchairs. It includes slides one can climb to via a wheelchair ramp, a carousel with two regular benches and two secured places for wheelchairs, hammock and swings one can easily use without sitting straightly and without holding tight, and so on. Disabled parking bays are located in the middle of the park, much closer to the facilities than the rest of the parking spaces.

The three million dollars of funding for the park was contributed by an Australian fund, and by the Fund for Beersheba Development.

== Gallery ==
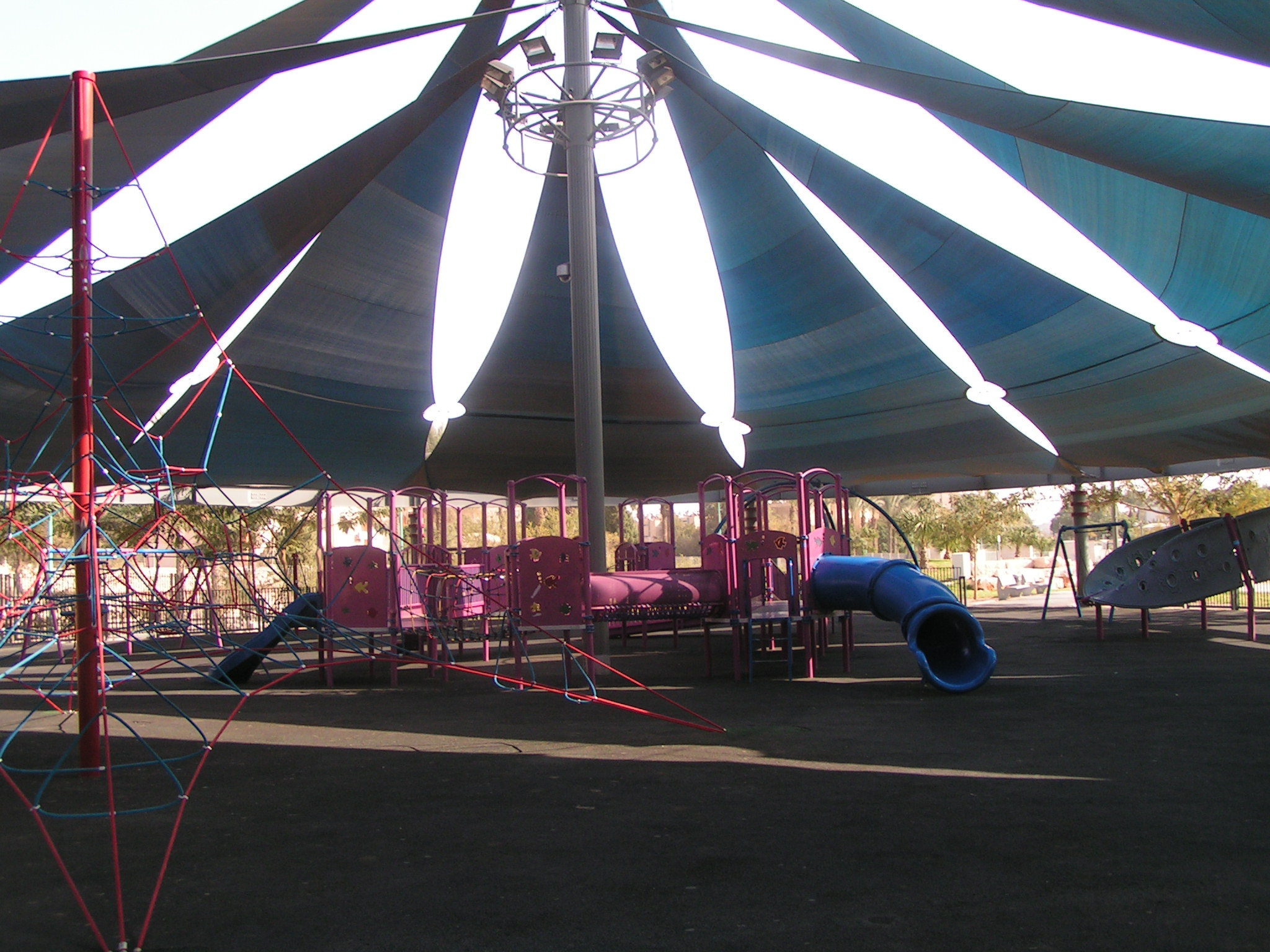
The accessible side array under the shade

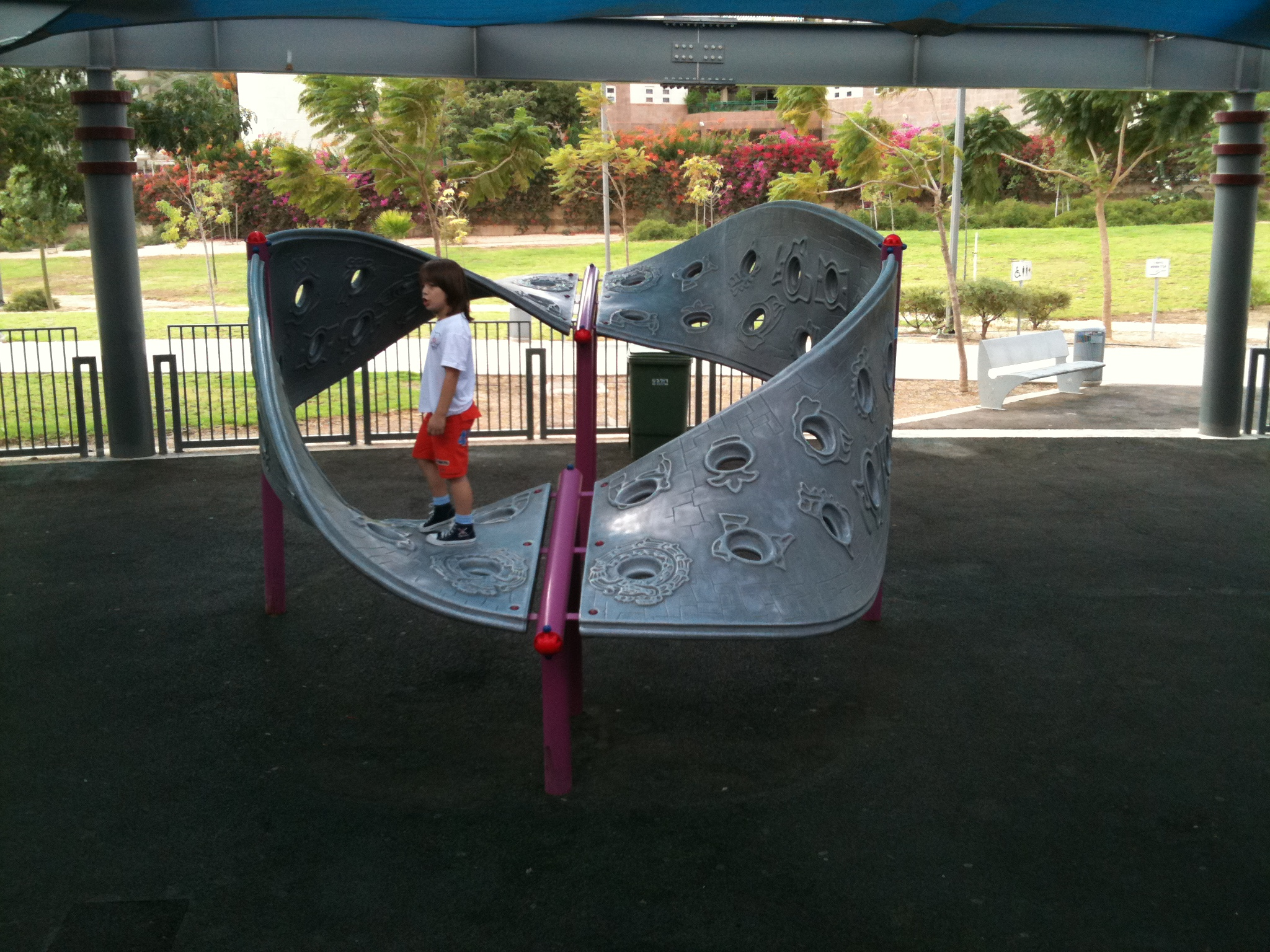
Möbius strip-like device in the park

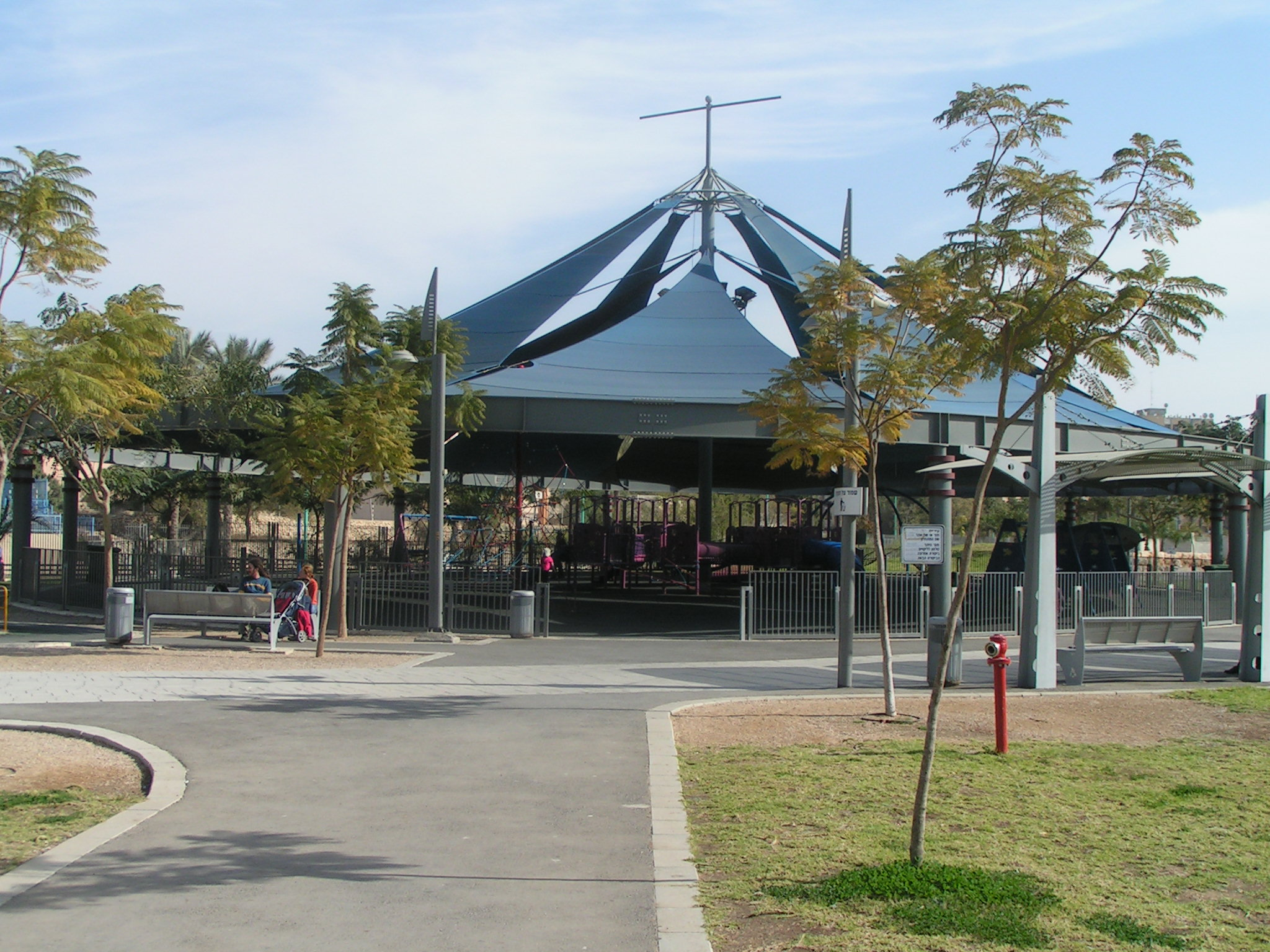
The playground

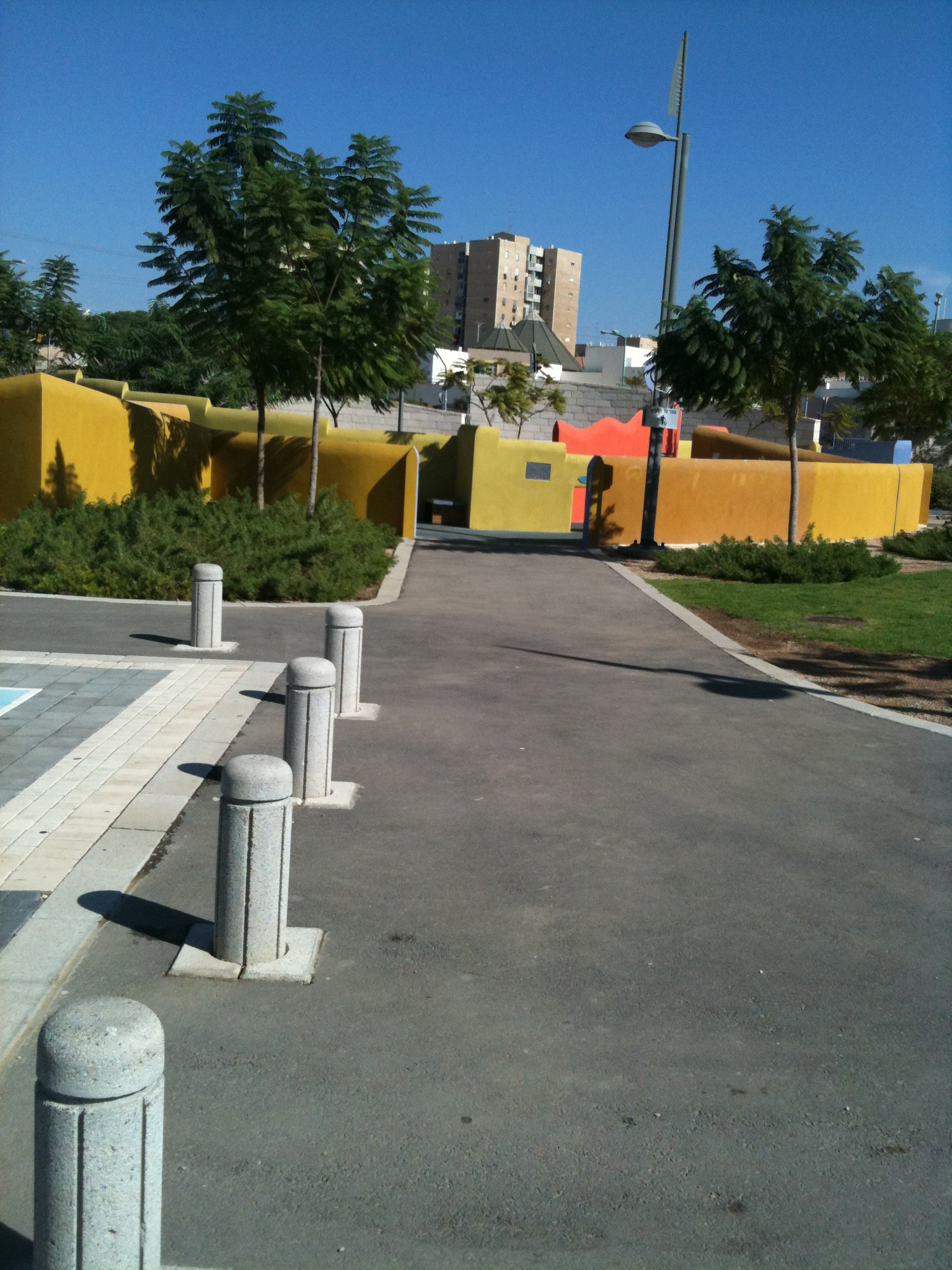
Approach to the maze

== See also ==
- List of Australian military memorials
