= List of Jewish economists =

This list of Jewish economists includes economists who are or were verifiably Jewish or of Jewish descent.

== A–G ==
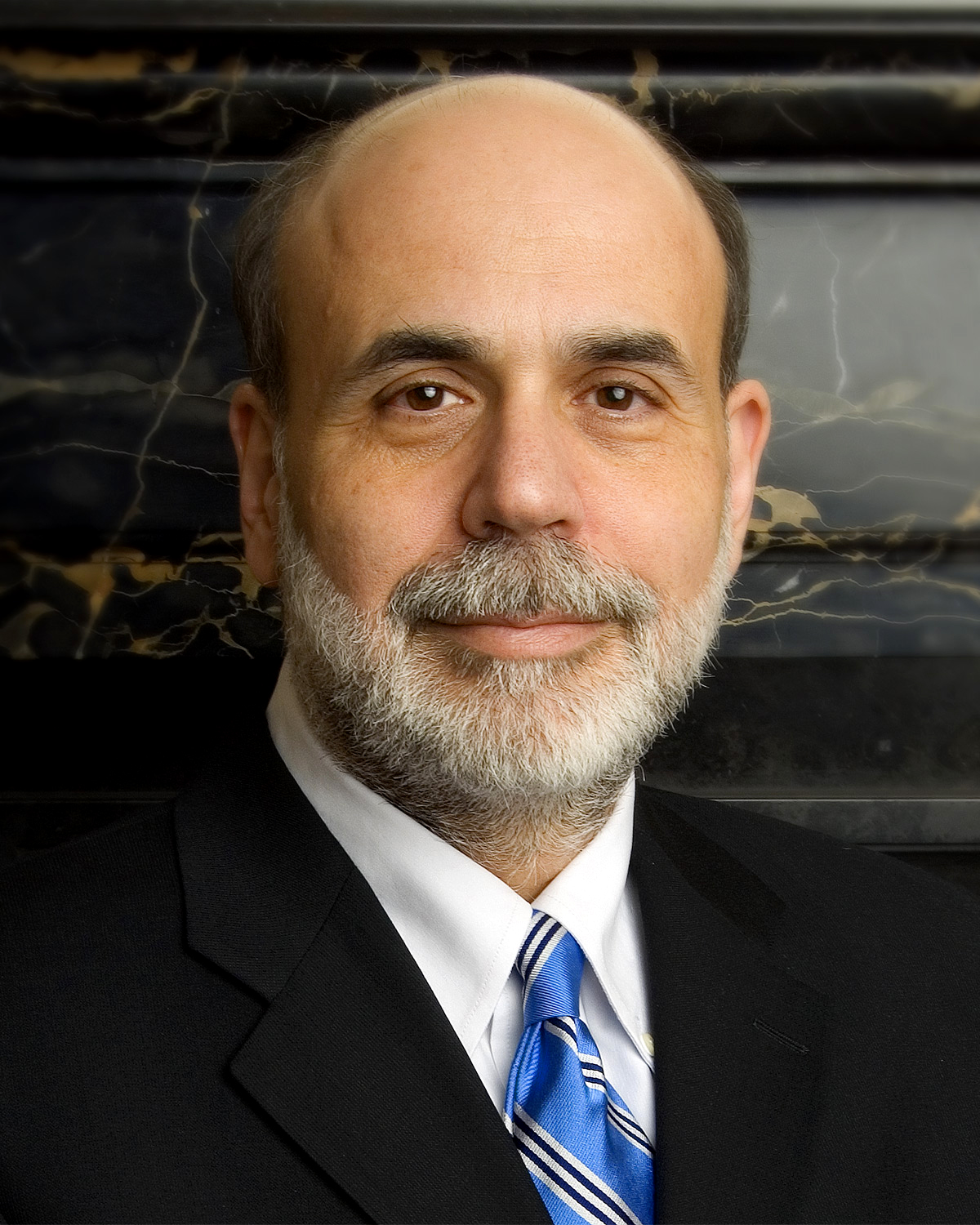
Ben Bernanke

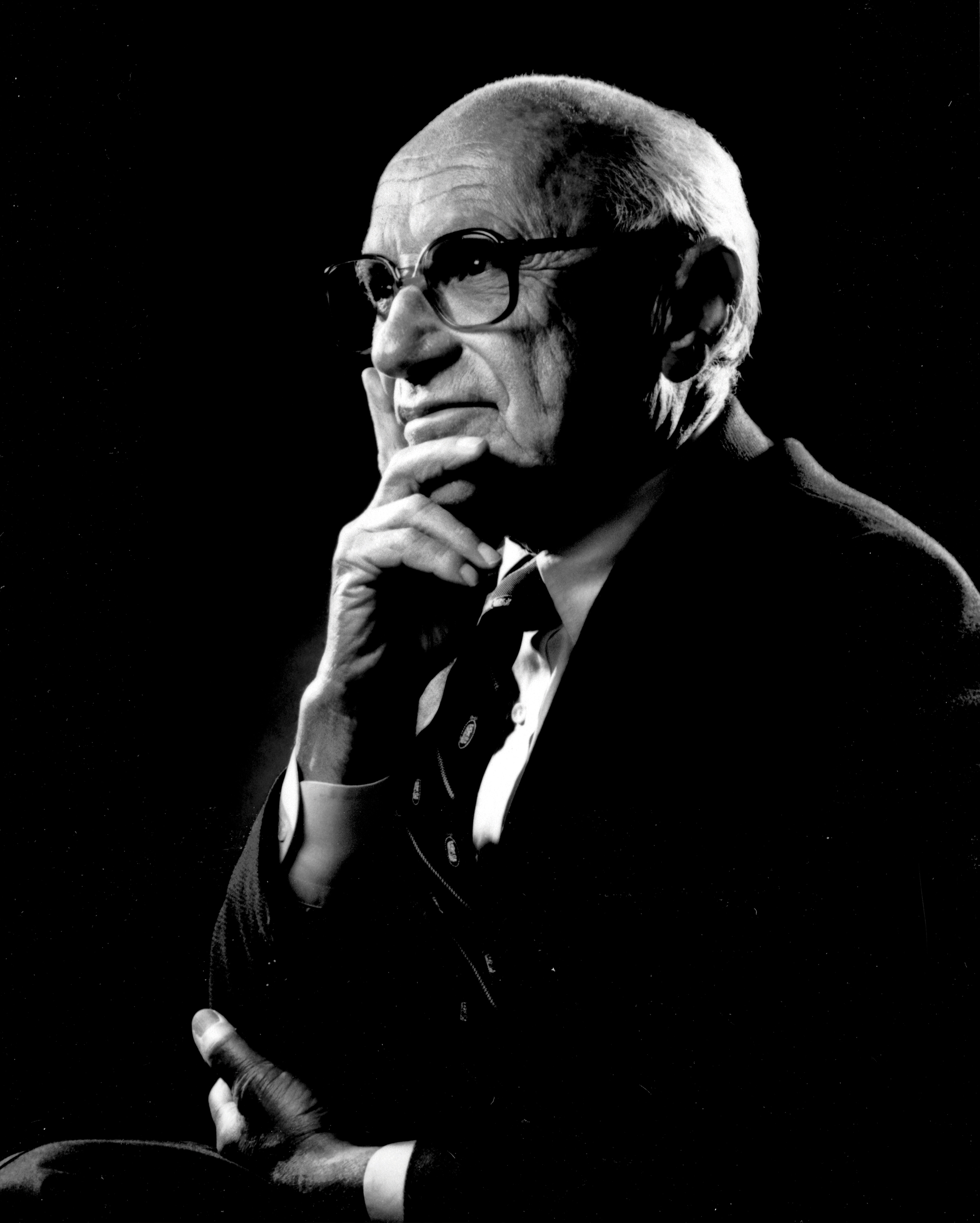
Milton Friedman

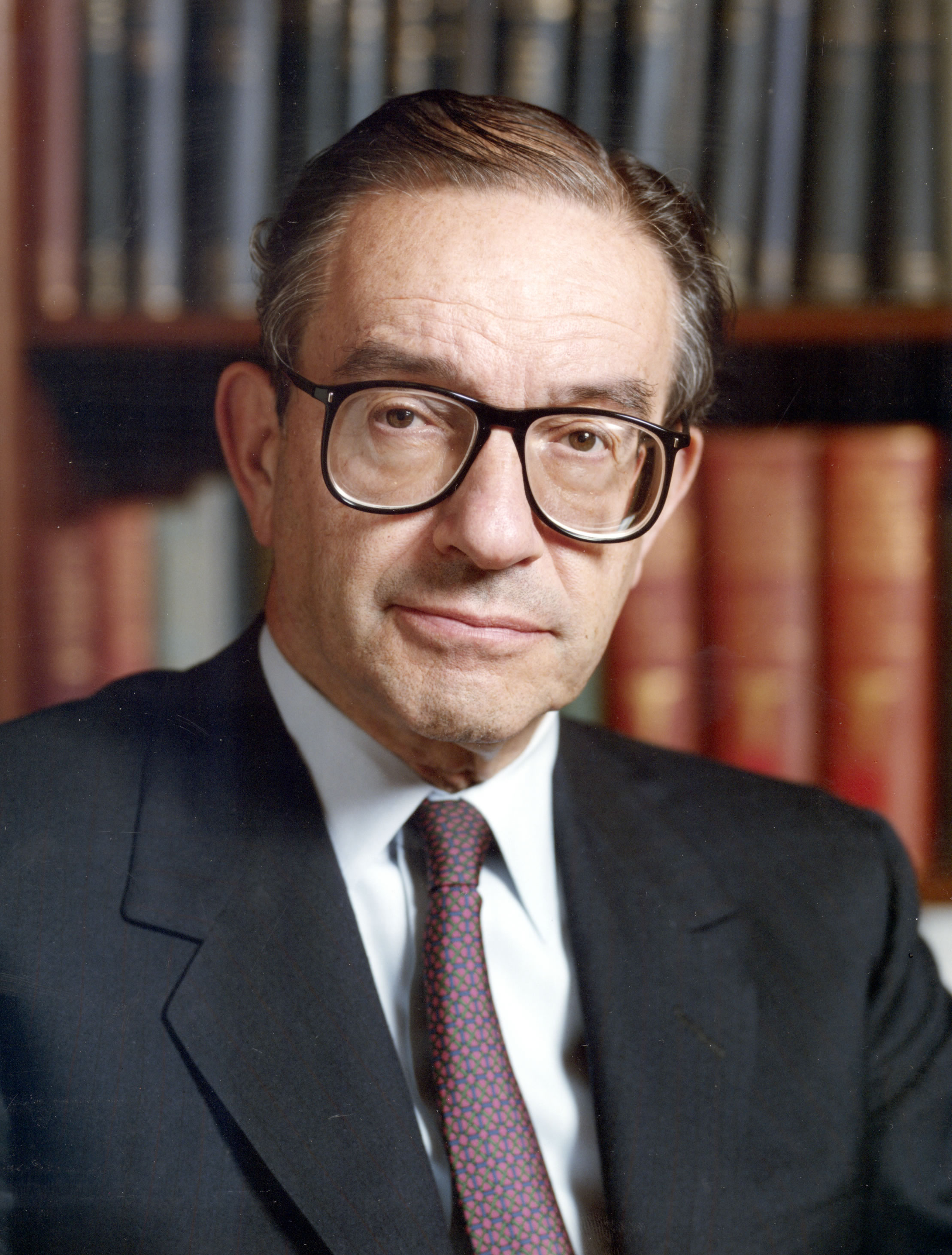
Alan Greenspan

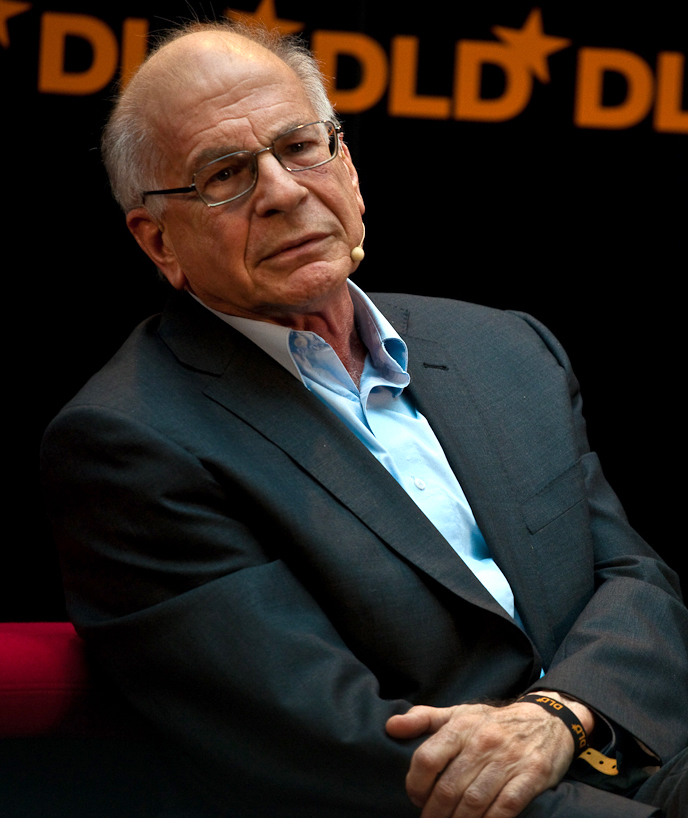
Daniel Kahneman

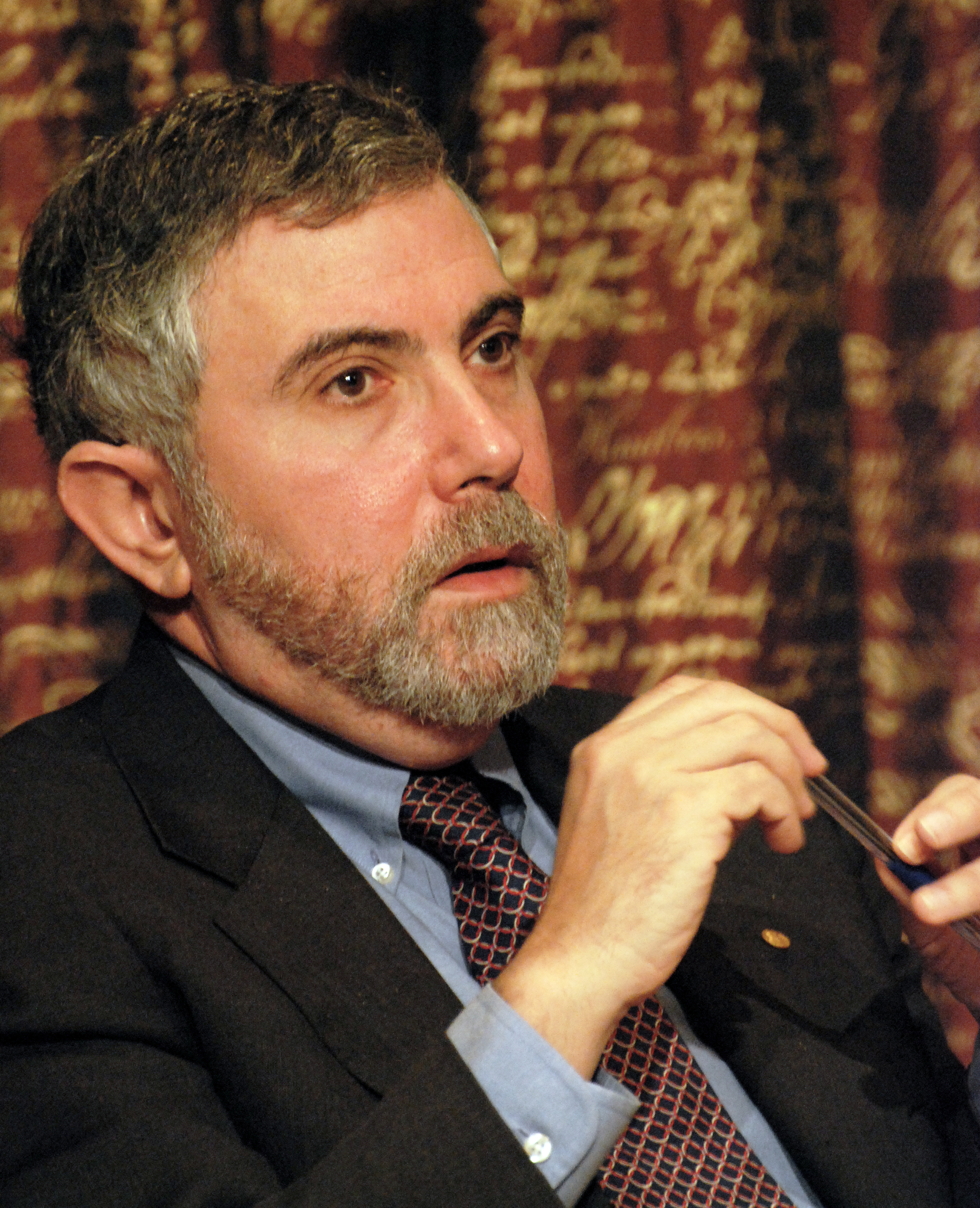
Paul Krugman

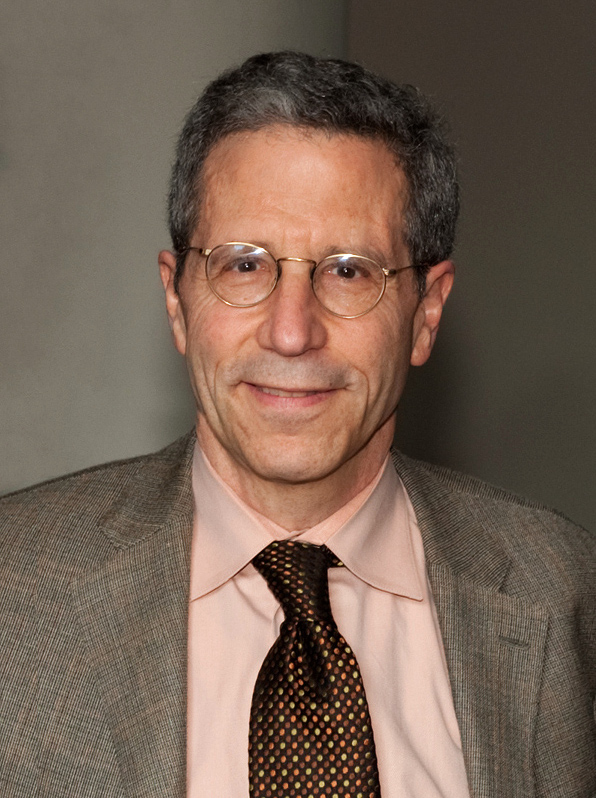
Eric Maskin

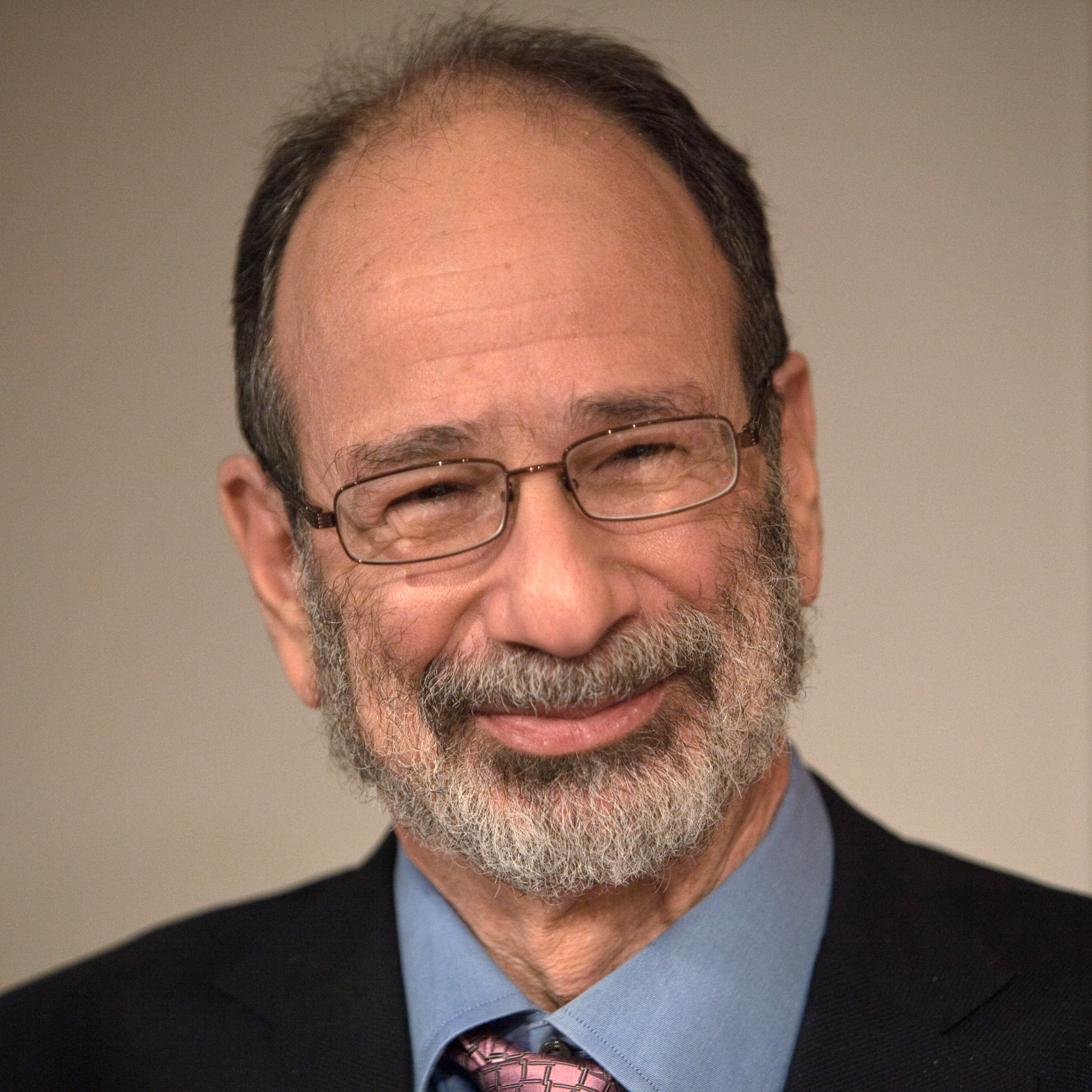
Alvin E. Roth

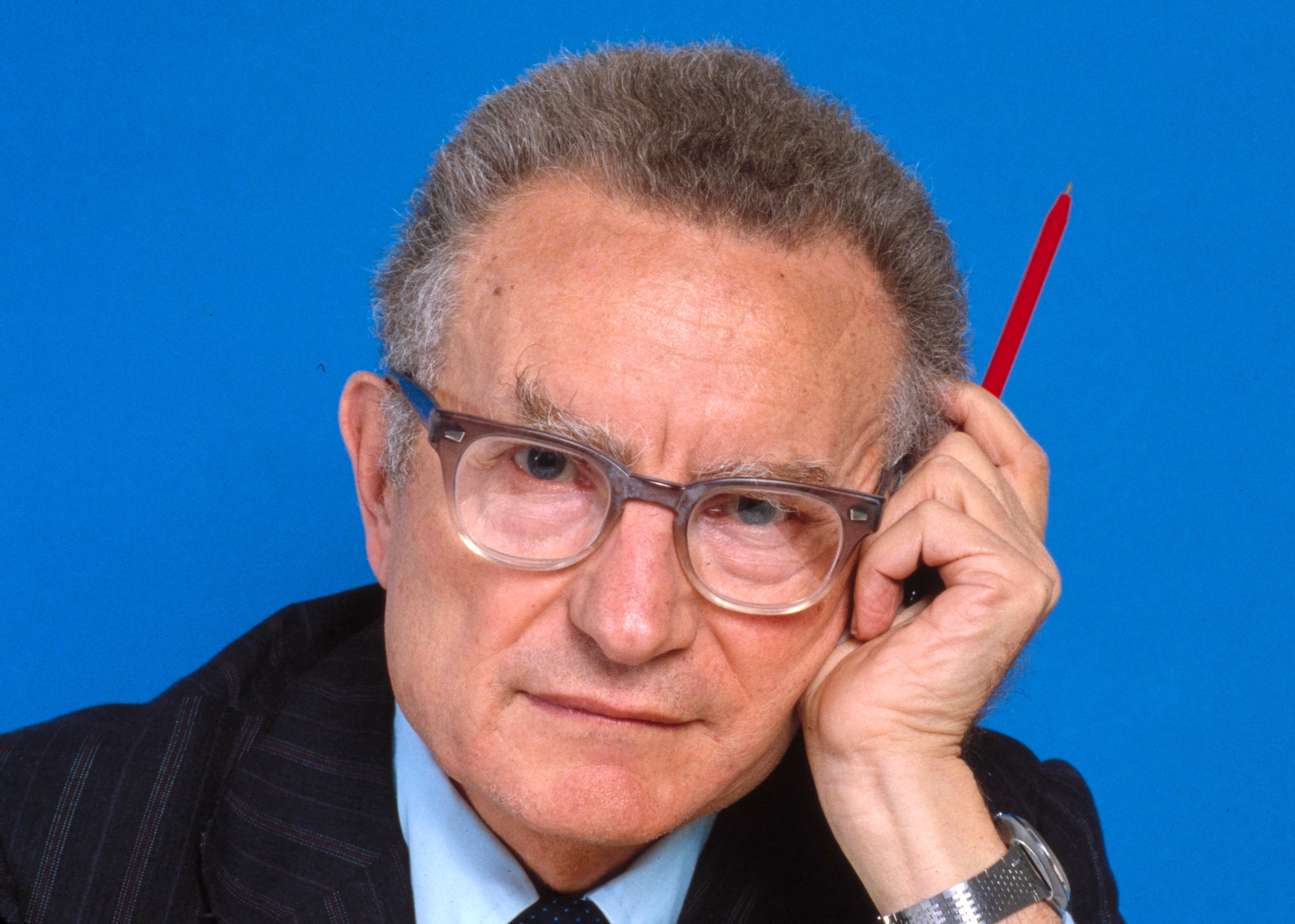
Paul Samuelson

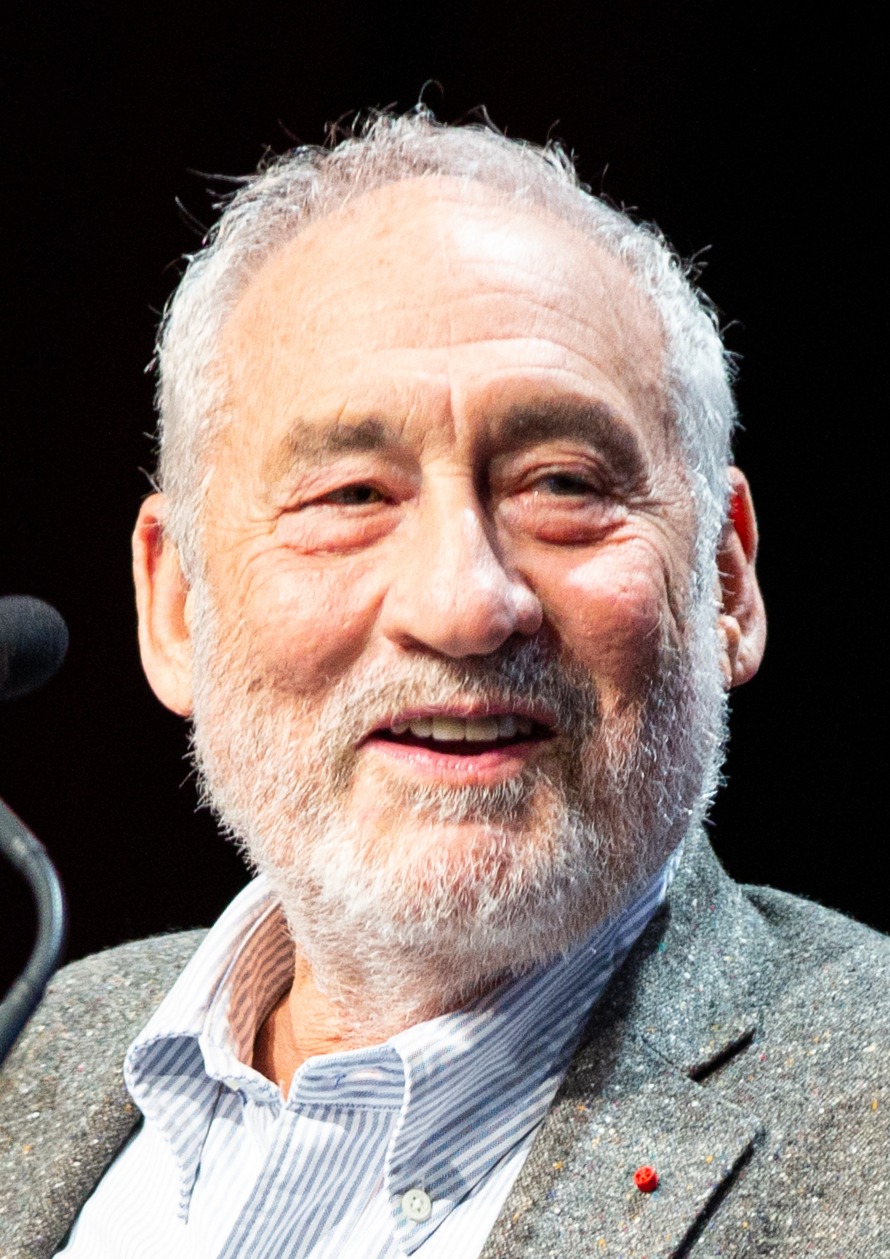
Joseph Stiglitz

- Albert Aftalion, Bulgarian-born French economist
- George Akerlof, Nobel Prize (2001)
- Joshua Angrist, Nobel Prize (2021)
- Kenneth Arrow, Nobel Prize (1972)
- Robert Aumann, Nobel Prize (2005)
- Lord Bauer, economist
- Gary Becker, Nobel Prize (1992)
- Yoram Ben-Porat (died 1992), Israeli economist and president of the Hebrew University of Jerusalem
- Ben Bernanke, economist and former Chairman of the Federal Reserve
- Jared Bernstein
- Mario Blejer, Argentine economist and former President of the Central Bank of Argentina in 2002.
- Walter Block, Harold E. Wirth Endowed Chair in Economics at Loyola University in New Orleans
- Arthur Burns, economist and former Chairman of the Federal Reserve
- Otto Eckstein, a key developer of the idea of core inflation
- Richard Ehrenberg, economist
- Martin Feldstein, Harvard Professor; Chair of the Council of Economic Advisors in the Reagan Administration
- Amy Finkelstein, economist, John Bates Clark Medal (2012)
- Robert Fogel, Nobel Prize (1993)
- Milton Friedman, Nobel Prize (1976)
- Barry Goldwater, half-Jewish American economist
- Charles Goodhart, Bank of England economist
- Alan Greenspan, economist and former Chairman of the Federal Reserve

== H–L ==
- John Harsanyi, Nobel Prize (1994)
- Henry Hazlitt, half-Jewish Austrian economist *Arnold Heertje, Dutch
- Rudolf Hilferding, Austrian-German marxist economist
- Leonid Hurwicz, Nobel Prize (2007)
- Richard Kahn, Baron Kahn, economist: multiplier
- Daniel Kahneman, Nobel Prize (2002)
- Leonid Kantorovich, Nobel Prize (1975)
- Israel Kirzner, economist (UK-born)
- Lawrence Klein, Nobel Prize (1980)
- János Kornai, Hungarian
- Paul Krugman, Nobel Prize (2008)
- Simon Kuznets, Nobel Prize (1971)
- Vladimir Kvint, economist and strategist
- Ludwig Lachmann, economist
- Harold Laski, economist
- Emil Lederer, economist
- Wassily Leontief, Nobel Prize (1973)
- Abba P. Lerner, Russian-born British economist
- Leone Levi, political economist
- Robert Liefmann, economist
- Ephraim Lipson, economic historian
- Adolph Lowe, German
- Rosa Luxemburg, economist, co-founder of the KPD

== M–Z ==
- Stephen Marglin, American
- Harry Markowitz, Nobel Prize (1990), John von Neumann Theory Prize (1989)
- Karl Marx, inventor of Marxist economics Karl Marx was ethnically Jewish. His maternal grandfather was a Dutch rabbi, while his paternal line had supplied Trier's rabbis since 1723, a role taken by his grandfather Meier Halevi Marx.
- Eric Maskin, Nobel Prize (2007)
- Robert C. Merton, Nobel Memorial Prize in Economic Sciences (1997)
- Paul Milgrom, Nobel Prize (2020)
- Merton Miller, Nobel Prize (1990)
- Hyman Minsky, American
- Frederic Mishkin, American
- Noreena Hertz, economist and activist
- Ludwig von Mises, Austrian School
- Franco Modigliani, Nobel Prize (1985)
- Toby Moskowitz, financial economist, Fischer Black Prize (2007)
- Roger Myerson, Nobel Memorial Prize in Economic Sciences (2007)
- William Nordhaus, BBVA Foundation Frontiers of Knowledge Award (2017), Nobel Memorial Prize in Economic Sciences (2018)
- Alexander Nove
- Arthur Melvin Okun, chairman of the Council of Economic Advisers (1968-1969)
- Don Patinkin, Israeli
- Sigbert Prais, economist
- Karl Polanyi, Austrian-Hungarian economist and economic historian
- Roy Radner, American who developed the Radner equilibrium concept
- David Ricardo, economist (converted to Quakerism)
- Alvin E. Roth, Nobel prize (2012)
- Murray Rothbard, Austrian School economist, writer, libertarian, and father of anarcho-capitalism
- Nouriel Roubini, Iranian-American
- Paul Samuelson, Nobel Prize (1970)
- Myron Scholes, Nobel Prize (1997)
- Anna Schwartz, economist who published A Monetary History of the United States, 1867–1960 (1963), which laid a large portion of the blame for the Great Depression at the door of the Federal Reserve System. President of the Western Economic Association International (1988)
- Arthur Seldon, economist
- Herbert A. Simon, Nobel Prize (1978)
- Sir Hans Singer, known for the Prebisch–Singer thesis
- Robert Solow, Nobel Prize (1987)
- Gene Sperling, Director of the National Economic Council (2011-2014)
- Piero Sraffa, Italian economist
- Herbert Stein, chairman of the Council of Economic Advisers (1971-1974)
- Joseph Stiglitz, Nobel Prize (2001)
- Lawrence Summers, economist, Treasury Secretary, Harvard President, former Chief Economist at the World Bank, John Bates Clark Medal (1993)
- Richard Thaler, Nobel Memorial Prize in Economic Sciences (2017)
- Jacob Viner, Canadian economist
- Leo Wolman, American economist.
- Basil Yamey, South African economist
- Janet Yellen, economist, former chair of the US Federal Reserve Bank

== See also ==
- List of Jewish American economists
