= The Center for Jewish-Arab Economic Development =

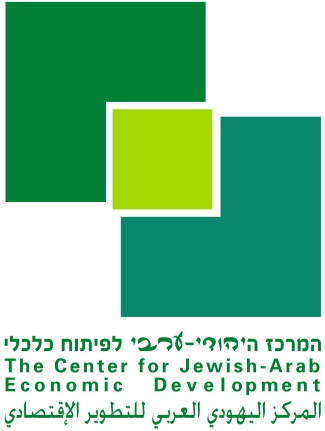

The Center for Jewish-Arab Economic Development (CJAED), located in Herzliya Pituach, Israel, is a non-profit, non-governmental organization founded in 1988 by Ms. Sarah Kreimer and a coalition of Jewish and Arab businesspeople. CJAED works to promote Jewish-Arab economic cooperation as well as develop a thriving Arab sector in order to establish peace, prosperity and economic stability in Israel and the region. The center's main premise is that Israel's primary resource is its people, therefore a vibrant and stable economy requires an integrated society. In 2010, CJAED was recognized as one of the "Ten Top Israeli Business Ventures" that promote peace in the Middle East.

== Background ==
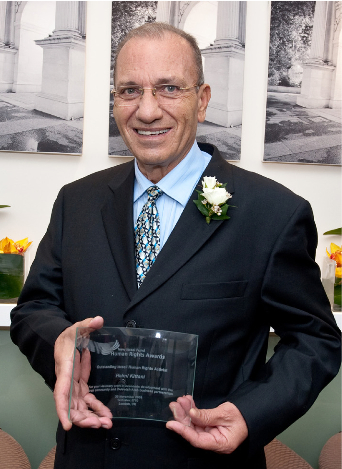
Helmi Kittani accepts NIF Human Rights Award in 2009

Israeli-Arabs constitute 20% of Israel's 7.4 million citizens, yet remain largely socially and economically disadvantaged with limited access to business credit, skills training, and marketing opportunities. According to a 2007 study, 56% of Israeli-Arabs lived under the poverty level IN 2006 in comparison to 17% of Israeli-Jews.

Israel has the highest poverty rate among the other OECD member nations, which affects Israeli Arabs and Haredim (ultra-religious Jews) to the greatest extent. Israeli Arabs have the highest unemployment rates among Israel's minorities and suffer from lower quality of public education. The OECD reports that public spending on education in Arab municipalities is 1/3 less than in municipalities that are predominantly Jewish. Forty-six of the 47 Israeli municipalities with high unemployment rates are populated by Arab-Israelis. These disparities are further exacerbated and perpetuated by the tendency of Arab families to have more children and could be eased by greater female empowerment. The average Israeli Arab woman has 4.0 children during her lifetime while Israeli Jews average 2.7. As of 2008, only 22% of Israeli Arab women participate in the workforce, in comparison to 71% of Jewish women.

Experts including the Or Commission, Lapid Report, and Shimon Shamir (Former Ambassador and Head of the Institute for Diplomacy and Regional Cooperation) have asserted that the establishment of industrial/employment zones adjacent to Arab towns are key to improving the economic situation by reducing unemployment, facilitating women's entry into the labor market, and increasing municipalities' tax revenues. Additionally, the Or Commission stated, “In contrast to the past, Arabs should receive significant shares in joint industrial zones with Jewish towns." According to the Inter-Agency Task Force, opportunities for economic development within the Arab sector have been hampered by the lack of industrial zones, which is also a factor in the low revenue levels among Arab local authorities. As of 2008, 90% of industrial zones in the Galilee region were under the jurisdiction of Jewish local authorities. CJAED is currently addressing this issue by expanding joint Jewish-Arab industrial zones through their Bar Lev and Mevo Carmel projects.

The executive director of the center is Mr. Helmi Kittani. In 2009, Mr. Kittani was awarded the New Israel Fund's Human Rights Award. In 2002, Mr. Kittani and Ms. Kreimer were awarded the Speaker of the Knesset's Quality of Life Award for the organization's efforts in promoting tolerance and coexistence. In 2009, Kiram Baloum, Director of the Women's Unit, was selected as one of Ha'aretz-The Marker Magazine's Top 40 women "making a change in Israeli society" and Ynet included Jasmine among the "Top 12 Social Projects of 2006."

== Units ==
=== Business Unit & Sulam Loan Fund ===
The Sulam Loan Fund, the main initiative within the Business Unit, was founded in 2004 in order to provide urgently required credit for small businesses under Arab or joint Jewish-Arab ownership. The fund is a joint partnership between CJAED, UJA-Federation of NY, Mercantile Discount Bank, Olivestone Trust, and large private donors. Over the past five years, loan funds in Israel have become an emerging strategy for Jewish Federations to provide resources for economic development, regional growth, and the creation of much-needed new jobs. Within this partnership, CJAED guarantees 50% of the loan to facilitate access to credit for entrepreneurs who do not have sufficient collateral including small individually or family-run enterprises, innovative businesses, women entrepreneurs and young business owners. It is the first loan fund to specialize in Israel's Arab sector and has assisted in the disbursement of 279 loans totaling $6.4 million since 2004. Loan sizes vary from $10,000 - $38,000 with the average loan summing to $23,000. The loans are granted for long-term periods - up to 5 years.

In 2009, 45% of the loans were for business creation and 55% for expansion. Examples for businesses that received a loan are restaurants, a cosmetics and hair care business and more. Sulam Fund has also enabled 104 women to create or expand their businesses with approximately $2 million of credit. Recent increases in the size of fund's collateral pool has enabled more loans to be approved by 43 of Mercantile Discount bank's branches.

On July 1, 2009, CJAED and Konrad Adenauer Stiftung hosted the 4th Annual "Jewish-Arab" Business Conference at the Dan Acadia Hotel in Herzliya. The conference, entitled "Economic Opportunities in Times of Crisis" featured both Jewish and Arab speakers who addressed the effect of the 2008 financial crisis and the consequences for Israel's Arab communities and businesses. Speakers included Avishay Braverman, Minister of Minority Affairs, Ramiro Cibrian-Uzal, Head of the EU Delegation to Israel, and Aiman Saif, Director of the Authority for the Economic Development of the Arab, Druze and Circassian Sectors.

The Business Unit is led by Mr. Tarek Bashir, an attorney and a member of the advising committee of the Prime Minister's Office Authority for the Economic Development of the Arab Druze and Circassian Sectors.

=== Women's Empowerment Unit & Jasmine ===
The Women's Empowerment Unit provides Jewish and Arab Israeli female entrepreneurs with skills training, consulting, and networking advice to build and strengthen their businesses. Jasmine: the Association of Businesswomen in Israel was launched in September 2006 as a result of research surveying 400 women with businesses in Israel and 13 organizations that work for the economic empowerment of women. The main findings of this research suggest the greatest need among women in business was for greater information, advocacy and national representation, and access to credit and other forms of finance. Ofra Strauss, Director of the Strauss Group, is the President of Jasmine and Kiram Baloum is the Director of the unit. In 2009, Jasmine launched the Jasmine Portal (www.jasmine.org.il), a sophisticated tri-lingual resource that functions as a virtual ‘hub’ and online marketing tool for businesswomen from a crosssection of fields and from all communities in Israel. In 2009, the first fifty businesswomen built websites through the Jasmine portal.

In November 2009, CJAED organized its 11th annual Jewish-Arab Businesswomen's Conference. This conference entitled “Women: Breaking Business Barriers” included speakers from both Jewish Arab sectors and discussed the tools accessible to women for promoting and development their businesses as well as the challenges and effects of the current global economic situation. Jasmine's President Ofra Strauss said with respect to the Jasmine Portal that “the Jasmine Portal will enable more women to realize their potential, earn a living and provide for their families. It offers them a site where they can find interesting issues and challenges while earning recognition for their successes." As of 2010, the Women's Unit has trained over 1,200 women leading to the establishment or expansion of 600 businesses.

Asalla Natural Desert Products is a group business entrepreneurship project formed by 8 Bedouin women from the village of Tel Sheva in the Negev. Within Tel Sheva, unemployment and crime are high and there is little urban or industrial infrastructure. In 2005 the group took part in a course, which was planned and executed by CJAED in collaboration with the local community center and the Tel Sheva Local Municipal Council. This course promoted personal empowerment and professional training, delving deeply into the subject of traditional medicine and healing by use of plants and herbs. Tel Sheva and Jasmine together built a program to develop the business with the hope of creating an herbal medicine and cosmetics chain based on their age-old Bedouin traditions and techniques. Each businesswomen was given a 20,000 shekel loan from the CJAED Sulam Loan Fund. The plants required for the products are currently picked by the group in unprotected desert regions. In the later stages, following negotiations with the Ministry of Agriculture, the company will be given land on which they can grow the plants. The Asala initiative has a planned line of 24 desert cosmetic products for the face and body, six of them (a facial cream for nurturing dry, regular and oily skin, and a cleansing cream for the three skin types) already received the Ministry of Health's approval and another 3 are in development stages. The products being developed are designed for care of complexion and beauty and for treating various skin problems. Asala products will be found in leading stores throughout Israel.

=== Joint Jewish-Arab Employment Zones ===
CJAED's Mevo Carmel Joint Jewish-Arab Employment and Zone combines a green-environmental emphasis with employment and enterprise development. Established by the Jewish and Druze municipalities of Dalyat el-Carmel, Usfiya, Yoqneam Illit, and the Regional Council of Megiddo, Mevo Carmel industrial zone will include CJAED's Joint Employment and Business Development Center. The center will include a “virtual” incubator, providing services to potentially over 800 small businesses from the area with the purpose of assisting them in growing their businesses. Eight Arab and Jewish green-businesses will be chosen for the "green" on-site incubator. These businesses will either manufacture or distribute products that are eco-friendly, contribute to the preservation of the environment by employing responsible manufacturing systems, or create new “green” technologies.

The Bar Lev Joint Jewish-Arab Employment Zone is establishing an Employment and Business Support Center for the Al-Shaghour Arab Municipality and Carmiel, Misgav and Mateh Asher Jewish Municipalities at its site in the North of Israel. The primary target population of the project's activities is the Muslim and Christian Arab population of Al-Shaghour. According to Israel Employment Service statistics, Al-Shaghour's unemployment rate is more than 2.5 times the national average, and double that of neighboring Carmiel. In 2009, the UJC/The Jewish Federations of North America's Social Venture Fund for Jewish-Arab Equality and Shared Society partnered with the Jewish Agency for Israel (JAFI) and CJAED to create a new loan fund for joint Jewish-Arab employment zones. The new loan fund will be launched with an initial investment of $200,000, which will provide loan guarantees that will permit as much as $800,000 in bank loans ranging from 150,000 to 500,000 NIS ($40,000 to $130,000) each. Chair Natan Sharansky said, “Together, with CJAED, we see this initiative as an important part of our strategy to bring greater prosperity to all sectors of Israeli society." By the end of 2011, CJAED expects the Bar Lev to be the incubator for 75 small businesses and 5-10 big employers, resulting in the creation of 3,000 jobs.

In 2009, CJAED director Helmi Kittani said in an interview “We believe our model of creating joint employment zones within Israel can be a very good model for joint Israeli-Palestinian employment zones along the green line.”

== Additional Achievements ==
-CJAED has helped develop more than 3,000 small business owned by women, which have generated 5,000 new jobs.

-2,500 Jews and Arabs have participated in CJAED conferences in the past 3 years, including the Annual Businesswomen's Conference and the Annual Jewish-Arab Business Conference.

-The Bar Lev and Mevo Carmel Joint Jewish-Arab Employment Zones are expected to produce a combined 10,000 new jobs within the next five years.

-CJAED established 2 Masters programs for Arab and Jewish students together at Haifa University, producing 150 graduates in Business Administration (MBA) and Location Government Administration (MLGA).

-CJAED launched “Building Business Bridges” in 2003 to unite 10 Israeli-Jews, 10 Israeli Arabs, and 10 Palestinians in an MBA Program in its initial year. The program was managed by Haifa University and funded by the European Union and United States. The students were required to have had 2–3 years of practical experience in management or business. During their learning period, Israeli Arabs and Jews and Palestinians were inevitably exposed to different aspects of each other's background, be it in the economic, social, cultural, spiritual or political realm. It aimed to develop cultural sensitivities between the groups, create an economic understanding of political issues, and push participants to consider the potential for business cooperation in the Middle East and elsewhere. The program included trips to Paris, Brussels, and Luxembourg, in which participants met representatives from the business world, political organizations and more. Graduates in 2005 have considered various future collaborative projects, such as an IT consulting firm, a media and production company for Israeli Arabs, and a bicycle factory in the Atarot industrial zone near Jerusalem.

=== Spin-off Organizations ===
The New Generation Technology (NGT) incubator, situated in Nazareth, is the first Jewish-Arab technological incubator and has been supported by CJAED since its foundation in 2002. NGT is part of the National Incubator Program that supports and encourages entrepreneurial projects in the fields of technology and biotechnology with guidance and support from the Office of the Chief Scientist of the Ministry of Industry and Trade. Success stories include D-Herb, an herbal formulation to counter diabetes, and Nutrinia, an infant formula developed with the same natural bioactive proteins that are usually found only in mother's milk. Founder, Davidi Gilo, said "There are many Israeli initiatives that open factories and do different things with Arabs - but basically the Jews are the employers and the Arabs the employees. NGT is the only project in Israel that is a pure, true partnership between Jewish and Arab businessmen in Israel. We're all board members, and we've all invested the same amount of money." Of the 12 operating projects at NGT, seven are Arab entrepreneurial initiatives, two are joint Arab and Jewish, and four are Jewish. The personnel at the incubator and portfolio companies at all levels both Arab and Jewish.

== See also ==
- Center for Muslim-Jewish Engagement
- List of Jewish economists
- List of Jewish American economists
