= List of Jewish American visual artists =

This is a list of notable Jewish American visual artists. For other Jewish Americans, see List of Jewish Americans.

- David Einstein, painter
- Paula Eliasoph, painter, printmaker, illustrator
- Vincent Glinsky, sculptor
- Joseph Goldyne, draftsman, printmaker
- Sylvia Hyman, ceramist
- Alex Katz, painter
- Nathaniel Kaz, sculptor
- Ibram Lassaw, sculptor
- Michele Singer Reiner, photographer
- Lionel S. Reiss, painter, creator of MGM's "Leo the Lion"
- Richard Serra, printmaker, sculptor
- Nell Sinton, painter
- Israel Tsvaygenbaum, painter
- Max Weber, cubist painter

== See also ==
- Category:Jewish American artists
