= List of Jewish American playwrights =

This is a list of notable Jewish American playwrights. For other Jewish Americans, see Lists of Jewish Americans.

- David Adjmi
- Lynn Ahrens
- Sholom Aleichem
- Woody Allen (born 1935), film director, writer, actor, and comedian
- Jacob M. Appel
- George Axelrod
- Jeff Baron
- S. N. Behrman
- David Belasco
- Saul Bellow
- Leo Birinski
- Agnes Borinsky
- Mel Brooks
- Paddy Chayefsky
- Betty Comden & Adolph Green
- Norman Corwin
- Howard Dietz
- Edward Einhorn
- Eve Ensler
- Harvey Fierstein
- Edna Ferber
- Herb Gardner
- Larry Gelbart
- Joel Gersmann
- Josh Greenfeld
- Oscar Hammerstein II
- Otto Harbach
- Yip Harburg
- Moss Hart
- Ben Hecht
- Lillian Hellman
- Peretz Hirshbein
- Israel Horovitz
- George Jessel
- George S. Kaufman
- Sidney Kingsley
- Tony Kushner
- James Lapine
- Arthur Laurents
- H. Leivick
- Alan Jay Lerner
- Ira Levin
- Craig Lucas
- David Mamet
- Donald Margulies
- Arthur Miller
- Cheryl Moch
- Becky Mode
- Itamar Moses
- Clifford Odets
- Carl Reiner
- Elmer Rice
- Morrie Ryskind
- Peter Sagal
- Rod Serling
- Irwin Shaw
- Wallace Shawn
- Sidney Sheldon
- Martin Sherman
- Neil Simon
- Isaac Bashevis Singer
- Joey Soloway, playwright, television writer
- Aaron Sorkin (born 1961), screenwriter, producer and playwright
- Gertrude Stein
- Joseph Stein
- Louise Stern
- Jeffrey Sweet
- Chaim Towber
- Alfred Uhry
- Wendy Wasserstein (1950–2006)
- Jerome Weidman
- Franz Werfel
- Norman Wexler

== See also ==
- List of Jewish American authors
- List of Jewish American poets
- Multi-Ethnic Literature of the United States
- Before Columbus Foundation
