= List of Jewish American poets =

This is a list of notable Jewish American poets. For other Jewish Americans, see Lists of Jewish Americans.

Double asterisks (**) denotes winners of the Pulitzer Prize for Poetry.

- Frances Payne Adler, American and Canadian poet
- David Antin, poet, critic and performance artist
- Rosebud Ben-Oni, poet and writer
- Charles Bernstein, poet, essayist
- Joseph Brodsky, Nobel Prize winner, and U.S. Poet Laureate
- Richard Chess, poet and academic
- Edith Covensky, poet, Professor of Hebrew and Israeli Studies at Wayne State University
- Celia Dropkin, poet
- David Edelshtadt, poet
- Norman Finkelstein, poet and literary critic
- Allen Ginsberg, beat poet
- Jacob Glatstein, poet
- Moyshe-Leyb Halpern, poet
- Stanley Kunitz,** poet
- Allen Grossman, poet
- D.L. Lang, poet
- Emma Lazarus, poet
- David Lehman, poet
- Mani Leib, poet
- Jeffrey Levine, poet
- Anna Margolin, poet
- Adah Isaacs Menken (1835?-1868), actress and poet
- Penina Moise, poet
- Aurora Levins Morales, poet, and Jewish Voice for Peace advisory board member
- Howard Nemerov, poet
- Alicia Ostriker, poet and scholar
- Grace Paley, poet and short story author
- Charles Reznikoff, poet
- Adrienne Rich, poet, essayist
- Morris Rosenfeld, poet
- Jerome Rothenberg, poet, anthologist, essayist
- Muriel Rukeyser, poet
- Delmore Schwartz, poet and essayist
- Karl Shapiro, poet, editor and academic
- Fradl Shtok, poet
- Samuel Ullman, poet
- Louis Untermeyer, poet and anthologist
- Yehoash, poet
- Louis Zukofsky, poet

== See also ==
- Jewish American literature
- List of Yiddish language poets
- List of Jewish American authors
- List of Jewish American playwrights
- Multi-Ethnic Literature of the United States
- Before Columbus Foundation
