= Haunted in the New World =

2005 book by Donald Weber

- Front cover
- Author: Donald Weber
- Language: English
- Genre: Literary criticism
- Publisher: Indiana University Press
- Publication date: June 30, 2005
- Publication place: United States
- ISBN: 978-0-253-34579-0
- OCLC: 56733135
- Dewey Decimal: 305.892/4073 22
- LC Class: E184.36.E84 W53 2005

Haunted in the New World: Jewish American Culture from Cahan to The Goldbergs is a 2005 book by Donald Weber written as an overview of 20th century Jewish American literature and popular culture. Abraham Cahan was one of the most recognizable Jewish-American writers in both Yiddish and English. The Goldbergs began in 1929 as a radio comedy and drama about a Jewish-American family, and the show was initially targeted for Yiddish radio stations, but they made the leap first to CBS radio in 1936, and then to mass-market television in 1949, becoming a long-running situation comedy.

== Reviews ==
According to a review in American Jewish History, "Weber's readings prove a valuable resource through their insightful demonstration of the interrelation of public culture with emotions that are deeply felt personally and, at the same time, shared experiences that proved definitional for many American Jews. Indeed, [...] Haunted in the New World provides the scholar of American Jewish life a valuable guide to issues of affect that can now seem mystifying to younger generations."

== See also ==
- American literature
- Jewish American literature
