= A. L. Mestel =

American surgeon (1926–2022)

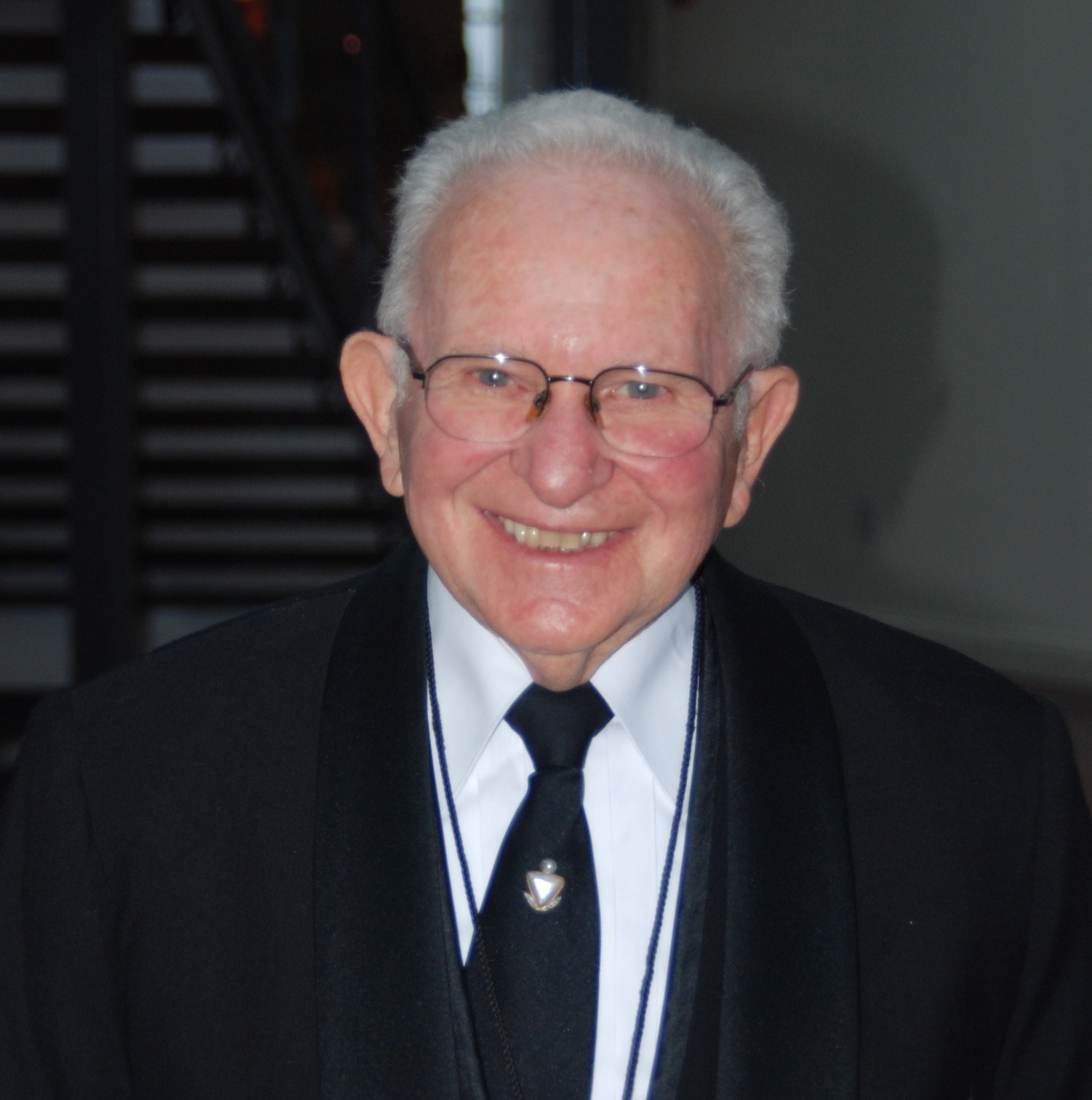
Mestel in 2007

Ascher Lawrence Mestel (September 17, 1926 – June 6, 2022) was an American pediatric surgeon and artist who was based in Brooklyn, New York. He was a pioneer in pediatric surgery. Mestel was especially well known for the groundbreaking first successful separation of Ischiopagus Tripus conjoined twins.

== Early life ==
Mestel was born on September 17, 1926. From 1944 to 1946, Mestel served in the United States Navy. After the Navy, he graduated from New York University in 1947. He then attended SUNY Downstate Medical Center, where he was elected to the medical honor society Alpha Omega Alpha and graduated in 1952. He went on to complete his internship and residency in General Surgery at Beth El Hospital (1952–1957) and a fellowship in Pediatric Surgery in the Hospital for Sick Children in Toronto, Canada (1957–1958). In addition, he obtained a Master's in Surgery at New York Medical College in 1958.

== Career ==
Mestel pediatric surgeon and artist who was based in Brooklyn, New York. He was one of the pioneers in the field of pediatric surgery and was widely published. Mestel was especially well known for the groundbreaking first successful separation of Ischiopagus Tripus conjoined twins.

Mestel served as president of the alumni, medical staff, and medical board at Brookdale University Hospital and Medical Center, and served on its board of trustees. In addition to his work in the United States, Mestel worked with Project HOPE (USA) in Jamaica.

In 1997, Mestel was awarded the Clarence and Mary Dennis Award for outstanding contributions and significant commitments to the SUNY Downstate Medical Center and to the Brooklyn community. In 1998, he was awarded the Alumni Service Award for providing exceptional service and leadership to the Alumni Association of the College of Medicine of SUNY Downstate Medical Center.

== Personal life ==
Mestel served as chairman of the Alumni Association and chairman of the Board of Trustees Alumnae at SUNY Downstate Medical Center. He was also active in the Jewish community and served as chairman of the board and president of Flatbush Park Jewish Center in Brooklyn.

Mestel was a sculptor and stained glass artist. His art won numerous awards and was exhibited at the Metropolitan Museum of Art, Brooklyn Museum, Staten Island Cultural Center, and Lever House.

After retiring from practice, he lived with his wife, Beverly, in Mill Basin, Brooklyn. Mestel died on June 6, 2022, at the age of 95.

== See also ==
- List of Jewish American biologists and physicians
