= Donald Weber =

- Occupation: Professor
- Writing career
- Genre: Jewish American literature
- Notable work: Haunted in the New World

Donald Weber is a literary critic and a specialist in Jewish American literature and film studies. He is the Lucia, Ruth, and Elizabeth MacGregor Professor of English and Chair of the English department at Mount Holyoke College.

== Background ==
Weber received his B.A. from State University of New York at Stony Brook and an M.A. and Ph.D. from Columbia University. He joined Mount Holyoke in 1981.

== Publications ==
- Haunted in the New World. Indiana University Press, 2005. ISBN 0-253-34579-0. The book's subtitle, Jewish American Culture from Cahan to The Goldbergs, reflects its broad scope as a review of Jewish-American literature and popular culture.

== See also ==
- American literature
