= Lists of American Jews =

These are lists of prominent American Jews, arranged by field of activity.

== Academics ==
- Biologists and physicians
- Chemists
- Economists
- Historians
- Linguists
- Physicists

== Activists ==
- Activists

== Artists ==
- Cartoonists
- Composers
- Entertainers (actors and musicians)
- Photographers
- Visual artists

== Legal system ==
- Jurists

== Military ==
- Military

== Politicians ==
- Politicians
  - Members of Congress
  - Cabinet members
  - Political milestones

== Sportspeople ==
- Sportspeople

== Writers ==
- Authors
- Journalists
- Playwrights
- Poets
