= List of Jewish American photographers =

This is a list of notable Jewish American photographers. For other Jewish Americans, see Lists of Jewish Americans.

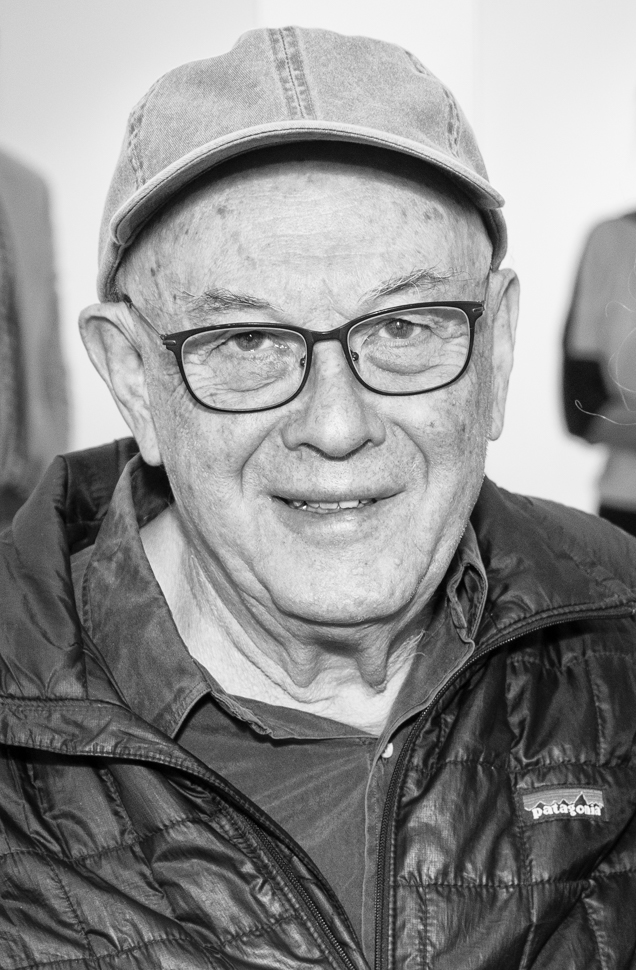
Bruce Davidson

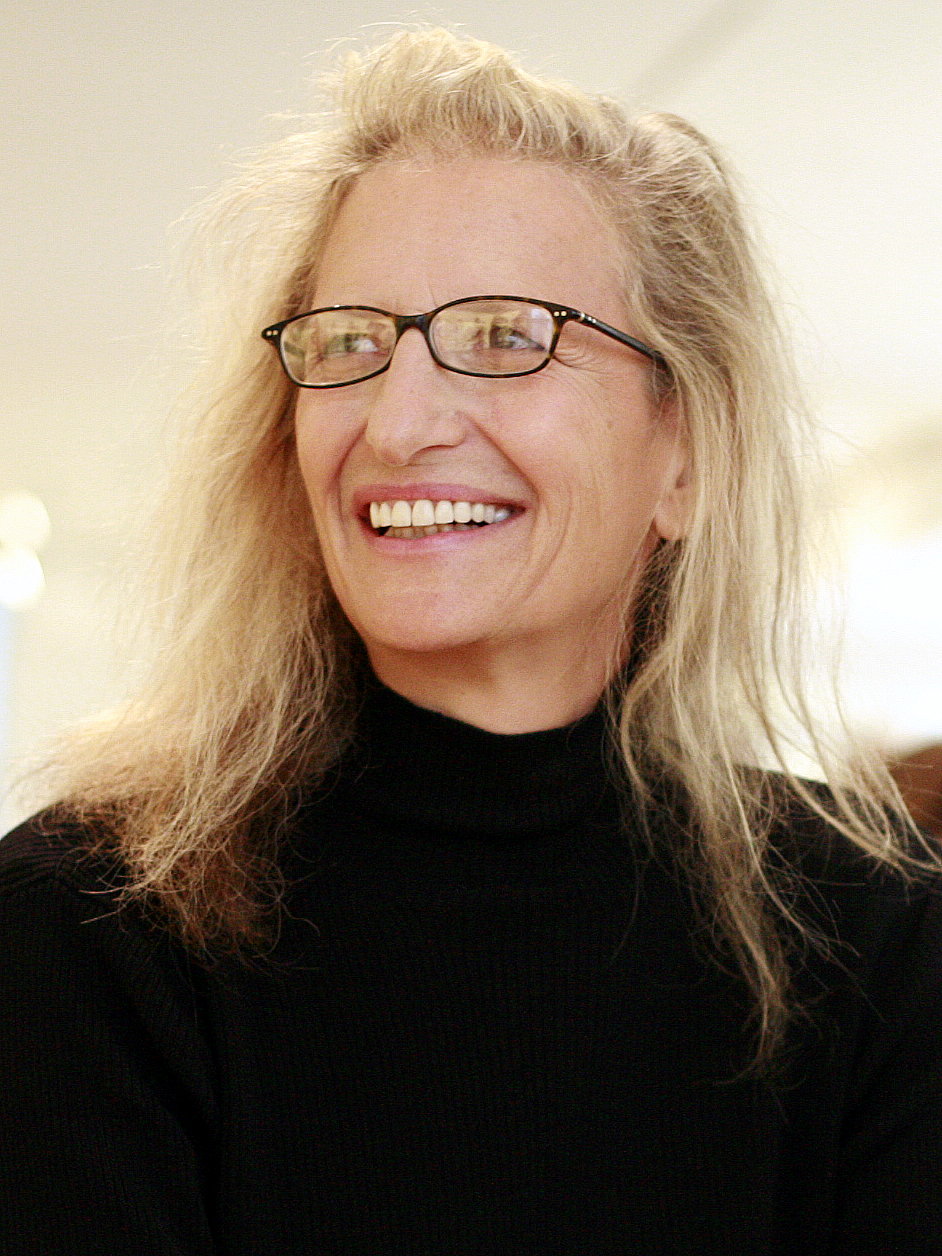
Annie Leibovitz

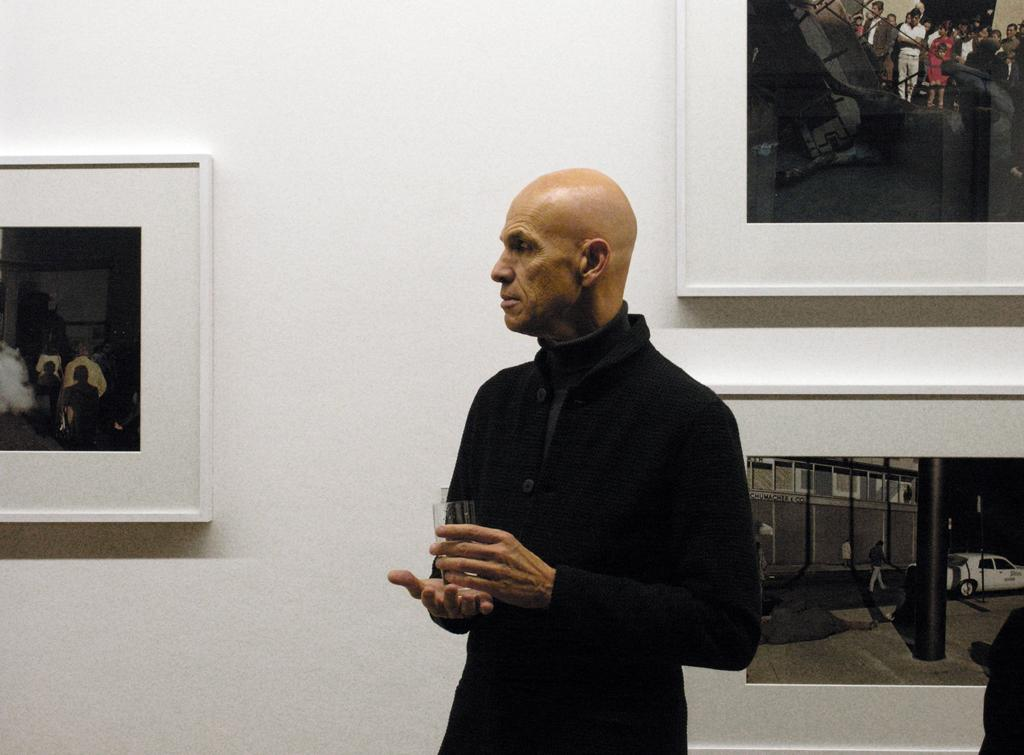
Joel Meyerowitz

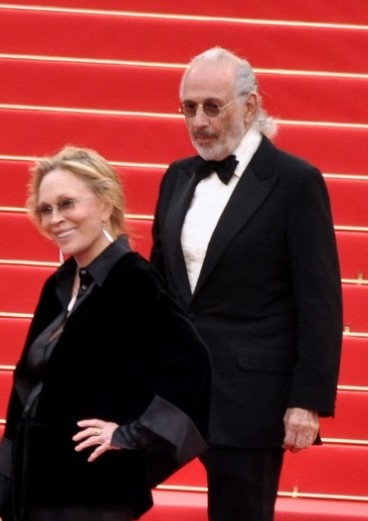
Jerry Schatzberg

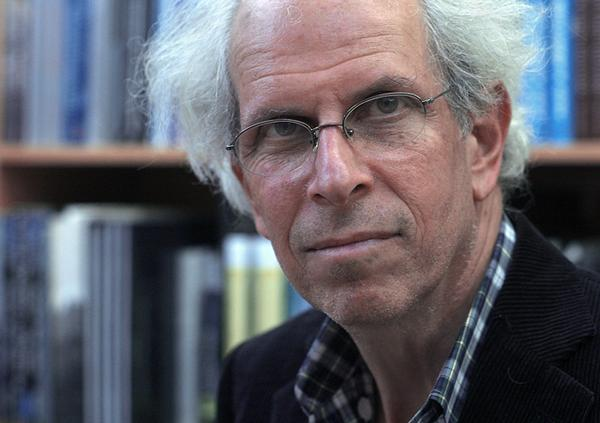
Stephen Shore

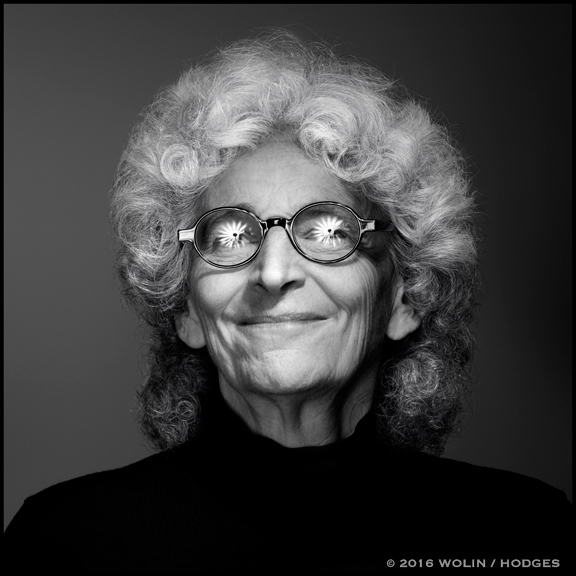
Penny Wolin

- Bob Adelman
- Merry Alpern
- Diane Arbus
- Eve Arnold
- Bill Aron
- Ellen Auerbach
- Richard Avedon
- Sid Avery
- Lillian Bassman
- Janette Beckman
- Michael Benabib
- Lucienne Bloch
- Erwin Blumenfeld
- Margaret Bourke-White
- Josef Breitenbach
- Robert Capa
- Solomon Nunes Carvalho
- Lynne Cohen
- Ted Croner
- Judy Dater
- Bruce Davidson
- Alfred Eisenstaedt
- Elliot Erwitt
- Louis Faurer
- Nat Fein
- Andreas Feininger
- Barry Feinstein
- Trude Fleischmann
- Robert Frank
- Leonard Freed
- Lee Friedlander
- Glen Friedman
- Nan Goldin
- Judith Golden
- Milton H. Greene
- Lauren Greenfield
- Sid Grossman
- Philippe Halsman
- Erich Hartmann
- Don Hunstein
- Lotte Jacobi
- André Kertész
- William Klein
- Max Kozloff
- Jill Krementz
- Gillian Laub
- Alma Lavenson
- Annie Leibovitz
- Saul Leiter
- Herman Leonard
- Rebecca Lepkoff
- Leon Levinstein
- Helen Levitt
- Danny Lyon
- Linda McCartney
- Vivian Maier
- Mary Ellen Mark
- Jeff Mermelstein
- Joel Meyerowitz
- Carl Mydans
- Arnold Newman
- Arthur Ollman
- Ruth Orkin
- Ricky Powell
- Irving Penn
- Man Ray
- Ann Rosener
- Joe Rosenthal
- Louise Rosskam
- Arthur Rothstein
- Eva Rubinstein
- Steve Schapiro
- Herb Scharfman
- Jerry Schatzberg
- Paul Schutzer
- David Seymour
- Ben Shahn
- Art Shay
- Cindy Sherman
- Stephen Shore
- Julius Shulman
- Aaron Siskind
- Rosalind Fox Solomon
- Bert Stern
- Phil Stern
- Marcel Sternberger
- Joel Sternfeld
- Alfred Stieglitz
- Ezra Stoller
- Lou Stoumen
- Paul Strand
- Stanley Tretick
- Doris Ulmann
- Roman Vishniac
- Weegee (real name Arthur Felig)
- Dan Weiner
- Garry Winogrand
- Penny Wolin
