= List of Jewish American physicists =

This is a list of notable Jewish American physicists. For other Jewish Americans, see Lists of Jewish Americans.

- Stephen Brunauer, Hungarian physicist who came to United States to study sciences. Inventor of BET theory and porous Portland cement.
- Albert Einstein, German-born, later naturalized American theoretical physicist who is known for developing the theory of relativity. Nobel Prize (1921).
- Richard P. Feynman, physicist, Nobel Prize (1965) (though he always refused to appear in lists such as this one and other lists or books that classified people by race)
- Cornelius Lanczos, mathematical physicist
- Albert A. Michelson, who measured the speed of light, and disproved the existence of the luminous ether.
- J. Robert Oppenheimer, "the father of the atomic bomb"
- Carl Sagan, one of the most prominent astrophysicists who is known for his research on the possibility of extraterrestrial life.
- Victor Frederick Weisskopf (1908–2002), physicist; during World War II, he worked at Los Alamos on the Manhattan Project to develop the atomic bomb, and later campaigned against the proliferation of nuclear weapons

== See also ==
- List of members of the National Academy of Sciences
- List of National Medal of Science winners
