= List of Jewish American chemists =

This is a list of notable Jewish American chemists. For other Jewish Americans, see Lists of Jewish Americans.

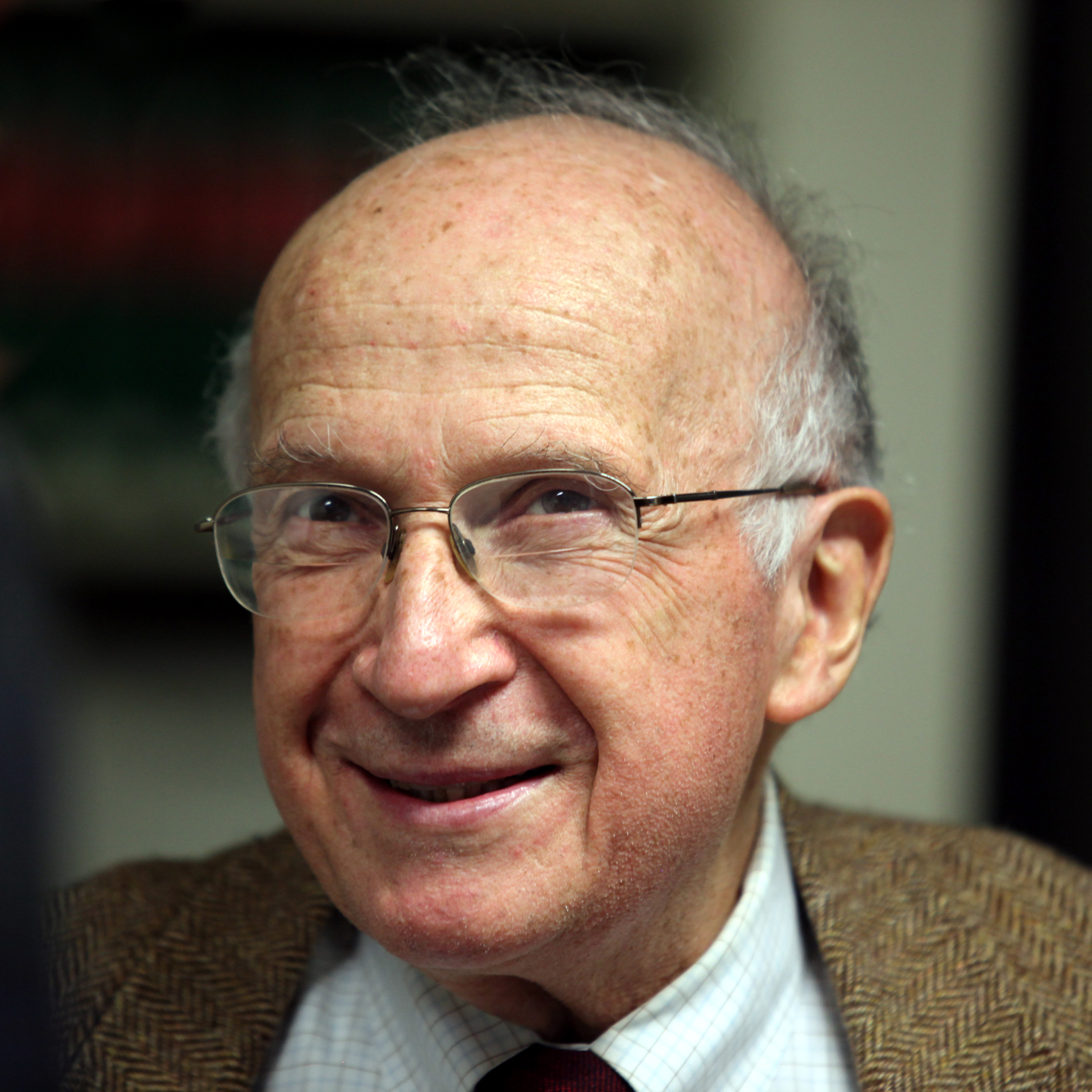
Roald Hoffmann

- Bruce Alberts (born 1938), biochemist known for work on DNA replication
- Sidney Altman (1939–2022), chemist, Nobel Prize (1989)
- Christian B. Anfinsen (1916–1995), biochemist, Nobel Prize (1972) (convert to Judaism)
- Julius Axelrod (1912–2004), biochemist, Nobel Prize in Physiology or Medicine (1970)
- David Baltimore (1938–2025), biochemist, Nobel Prize in Physiology or Medicine (1975)
- Allen J. Bard (1933–2024), electrochemist, inventor of scanning electrochemical microscope, Wolf Prize (2008)
- Paul Berg (1926–2023), biochemist, Nobel Prize (1980)
- Konrad Bloch (1912–2000), biochemist, Nobel Prize in Physiology or Medicine (1964)
- Ronald Breslow (1931–2017), chemist known for work on chemical mechanisms
- Melvin Calvin (1911–1997), biochemist known for discovering the Calvin cycle, Nobel Prize in Chemistry (1961)
- Carl Djerassi (1923–2015), pharmaceutical chemist known for development of oral contraceptive pills
- Murray Eden (1920–2020), physical chemist
- Gertrude B. Elion (1918–1999), biochemist and pharmacologist, Nobel Prize in Physiology or Medicine (1988)
- Walter Gilbert (born 1932), biochemist, developed a method for DNA sequencing, Nobel Prize (1980)
- Herbert A. Hauptman (1917–2011), chemist, Nobel Prize (1985)
- Roald Hoffmann (born 1937), chemist and writer, Nobel Prize winner (1981)
- Martin Kamen (1913–2002), chemist who introduced ^{14}C as a tracer for biochemical reactions
- Martin Karplus (1930–2024), theoretical chemist, Nobel Prize in Chemistry (2013)
- Arthur Kornberg (1918–2007), biochemist, Nobel Prize in Physiology or Medicine (1959)
- Daniel Koshland (1920–2007), biochemist known for induced fit
- Fritz Lipmann (1899–1986) biochemist whose research on coenzyme A led to a Nobel Prize in Physiology or Medicine (1953)
- Rudolph Arthur Marcus (1923–2026) chemist, theory of electron-transfer reactions, Nobel Prize in Chemistry (1992)
- Jacob A. Marinsky (1918–2005), chemist who co-discovered promethium
- Matthew Meselson (born 1930) geneticist and molecular biologist, discovered semi-conservative DNA replication
- George Olah (1927–2017) chemist, research on carbocations, Nobel Prize in Chemistry (1994)
- Alexander Pines (1945–2024), physical chemist, expert in solid-state NMR, Wolf Prize (1991)
- Martin Pope (1918–2022), physical chemist, Davy Medal (2006)
- Stanley B. Prusiner (born 1942) neurologist and biochemist, discovered prions, Nobel Prize in Physiology or Medicine (1997)
- Efraim Racker (1913–1991), biochemist known for identifying and purifying Factor 1
- Michael Rossmann (1930–2019), structural biologist who discovered the Rossmann fold protein motif.
- William Stein (1911–1980), biochemist who worked on the ribonuclease sequence and catalytic activity, Nobel Prize (1972)
- Gilbert Stork (1921–2017), organic chemist, known for making contributions to the total synthesis of natural products
- Howard Martin Temin (1934–1994), geneticist and virologist who discovered reverse transcriptase, Nobel Prize in Physiology or Medicine (1975)
- Ronald Vale (born 1959), biochemist and cell biologist, research on kinesin and dynein
- Frank Westheimer (1912–2007), chemist known for pioneering work in physical organic chemistry
- Richard Zare (born 1939), chemist known for the development of laser-induced fluorescence
