= List of Jewish American economists =

This is a list of notable Jewish American economists. For other Jewish Americans, see Lists of Jewish Americans.

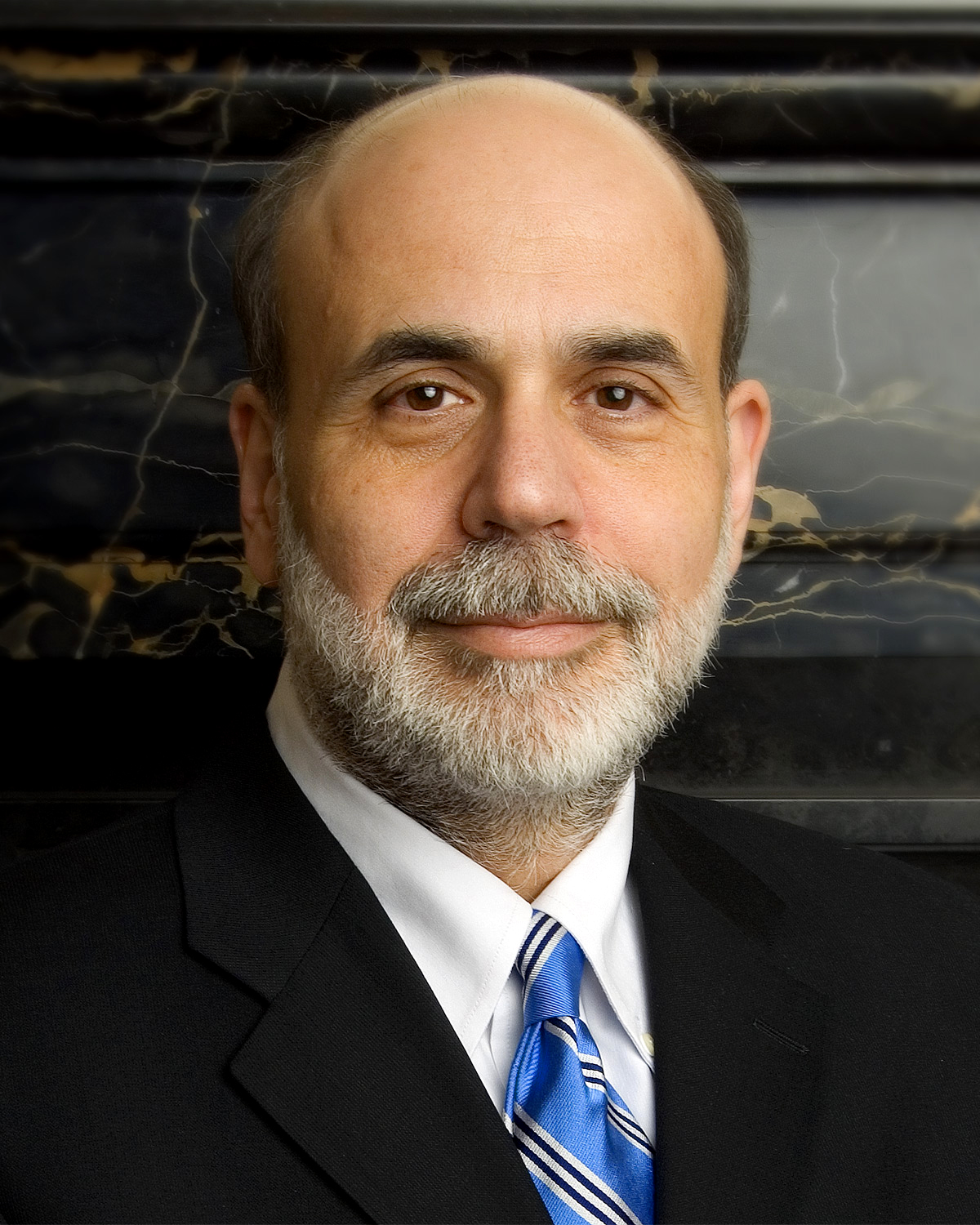
Ben Bernanke

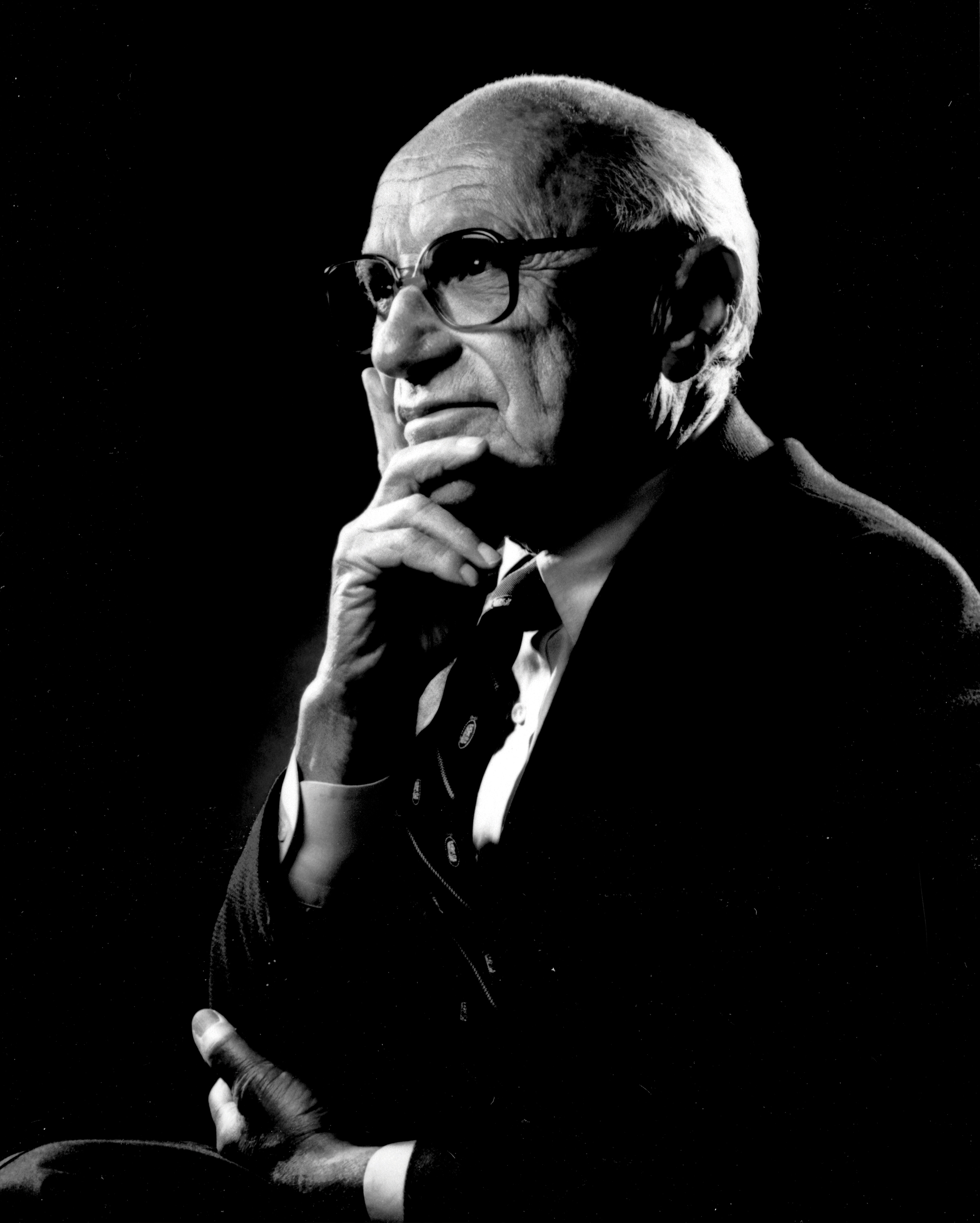
Milton Friedman

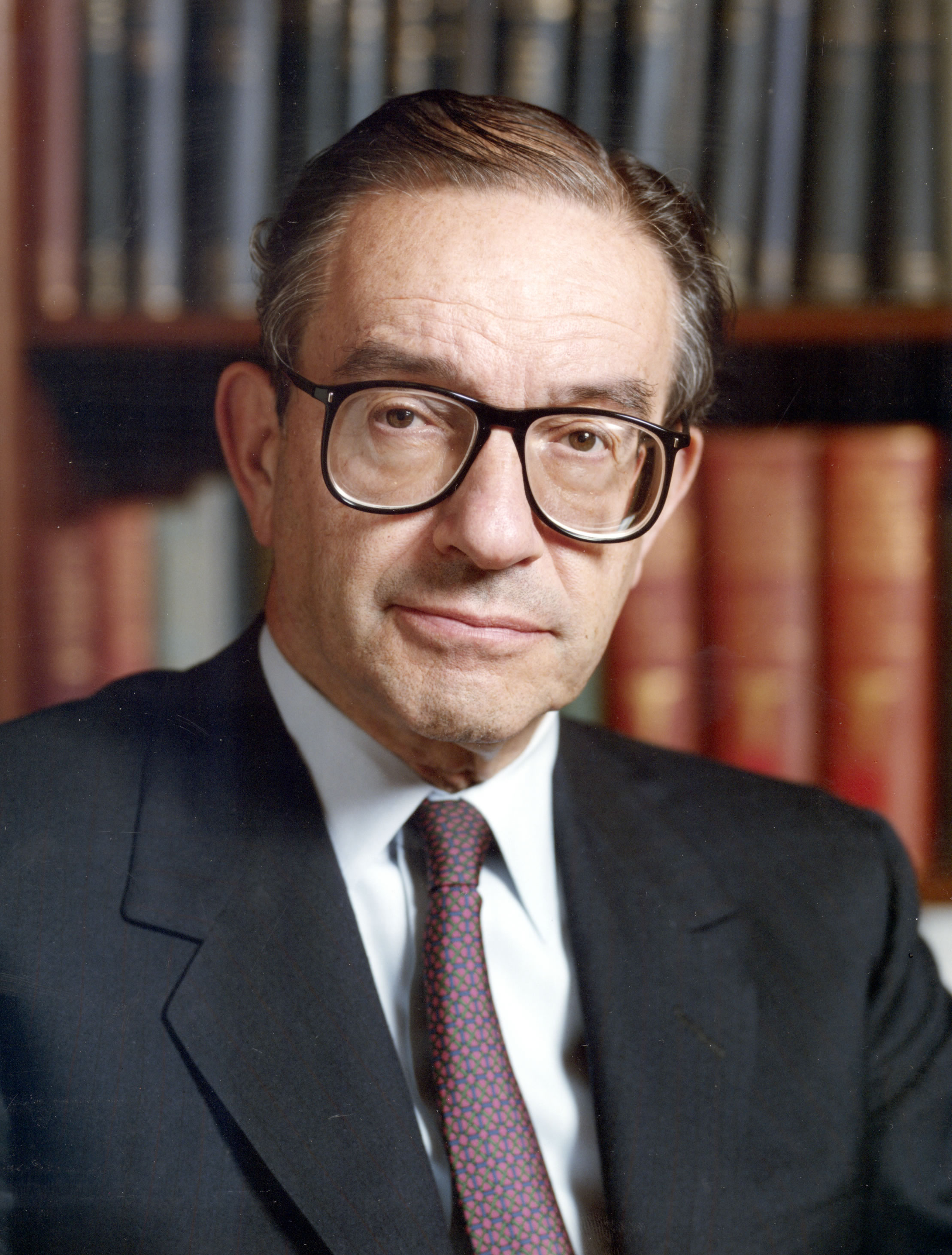
Alan Greenspan

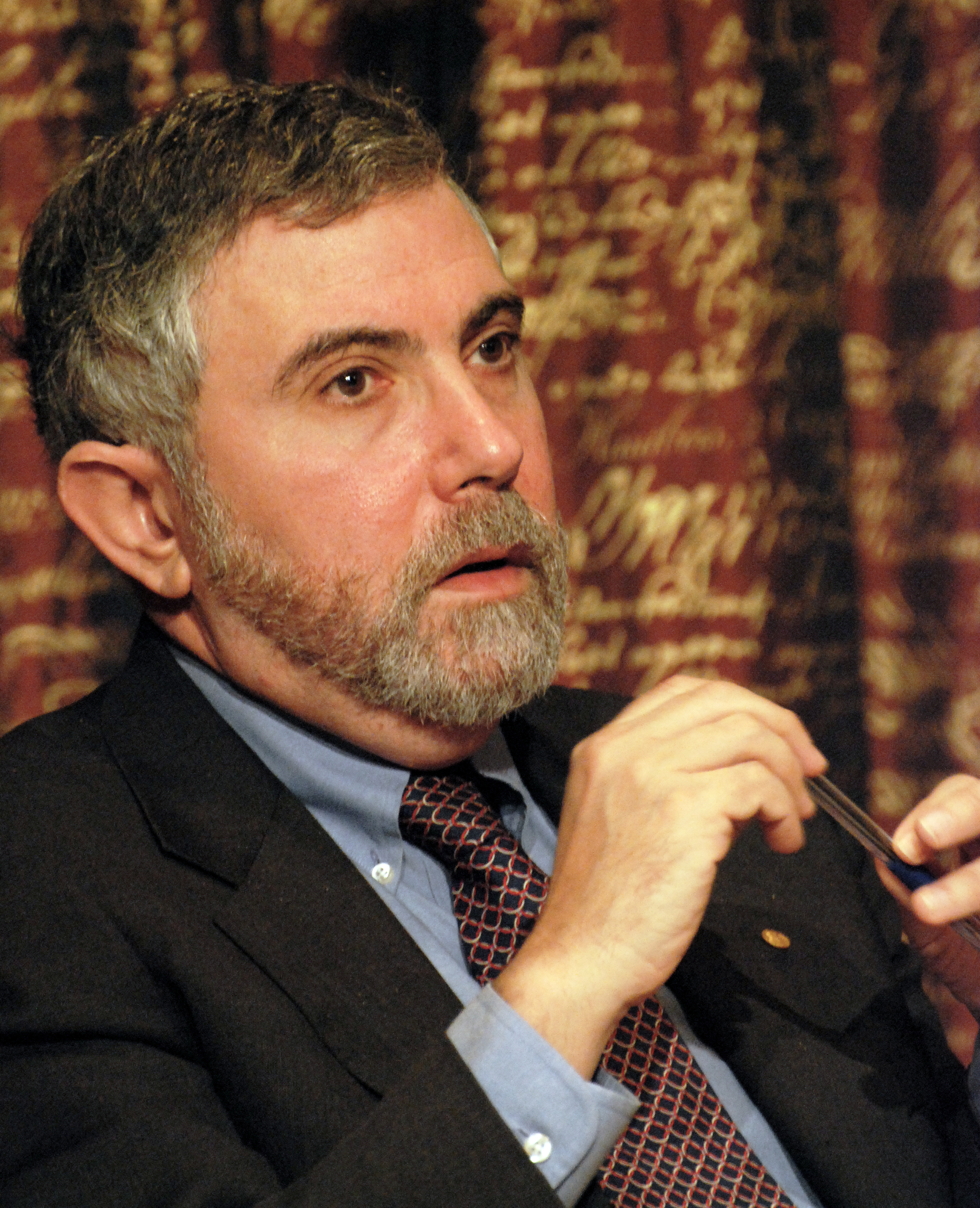
Paul Krugman

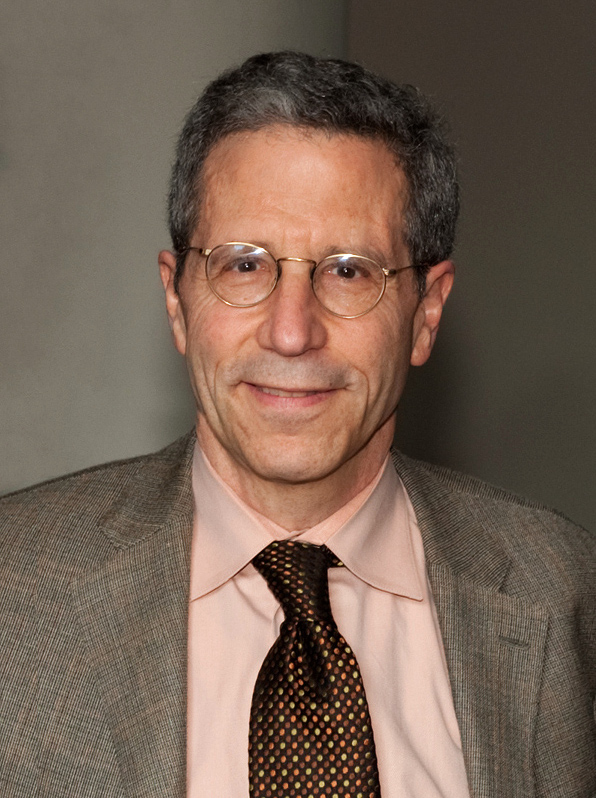
Eric Maskin

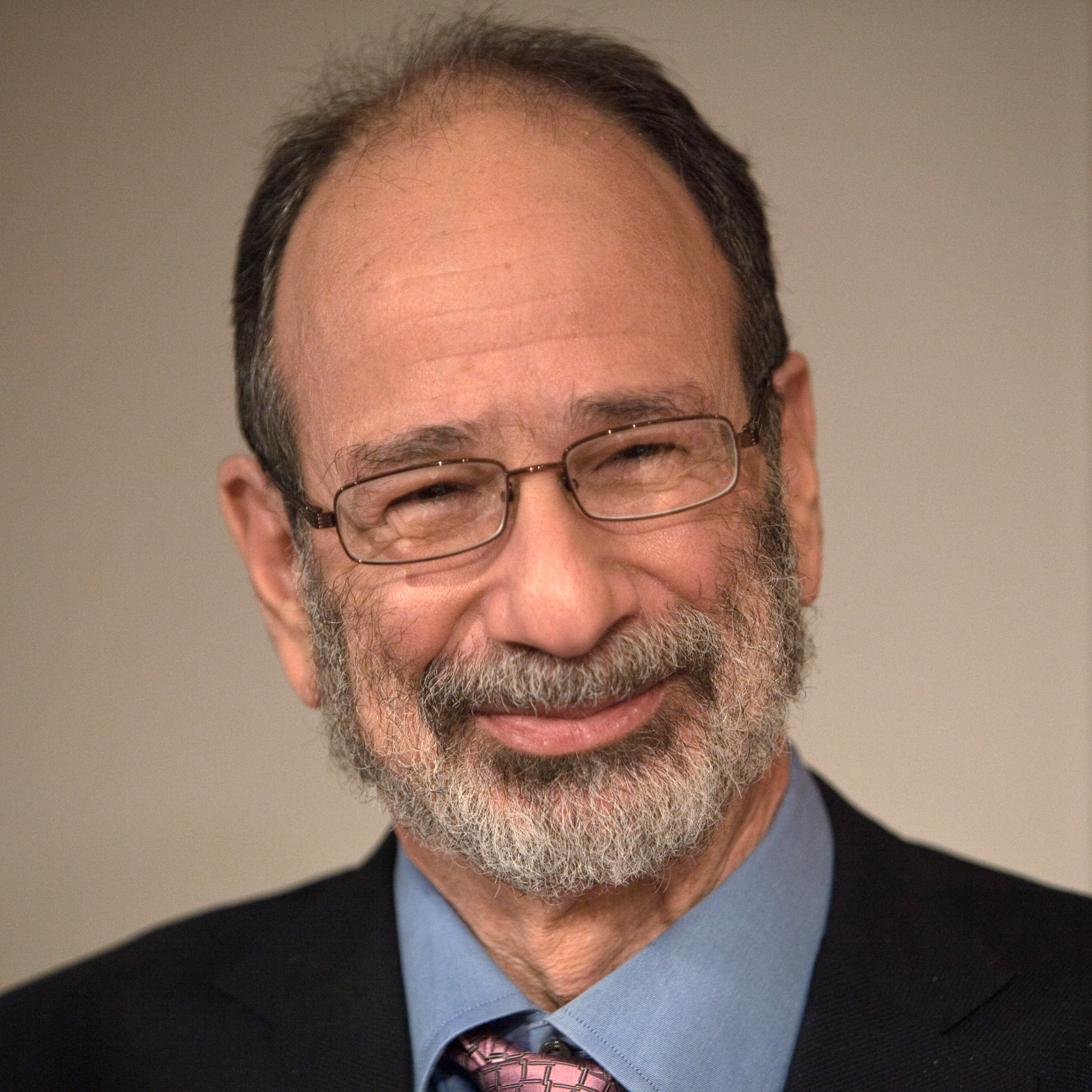
Alvin E. Roth

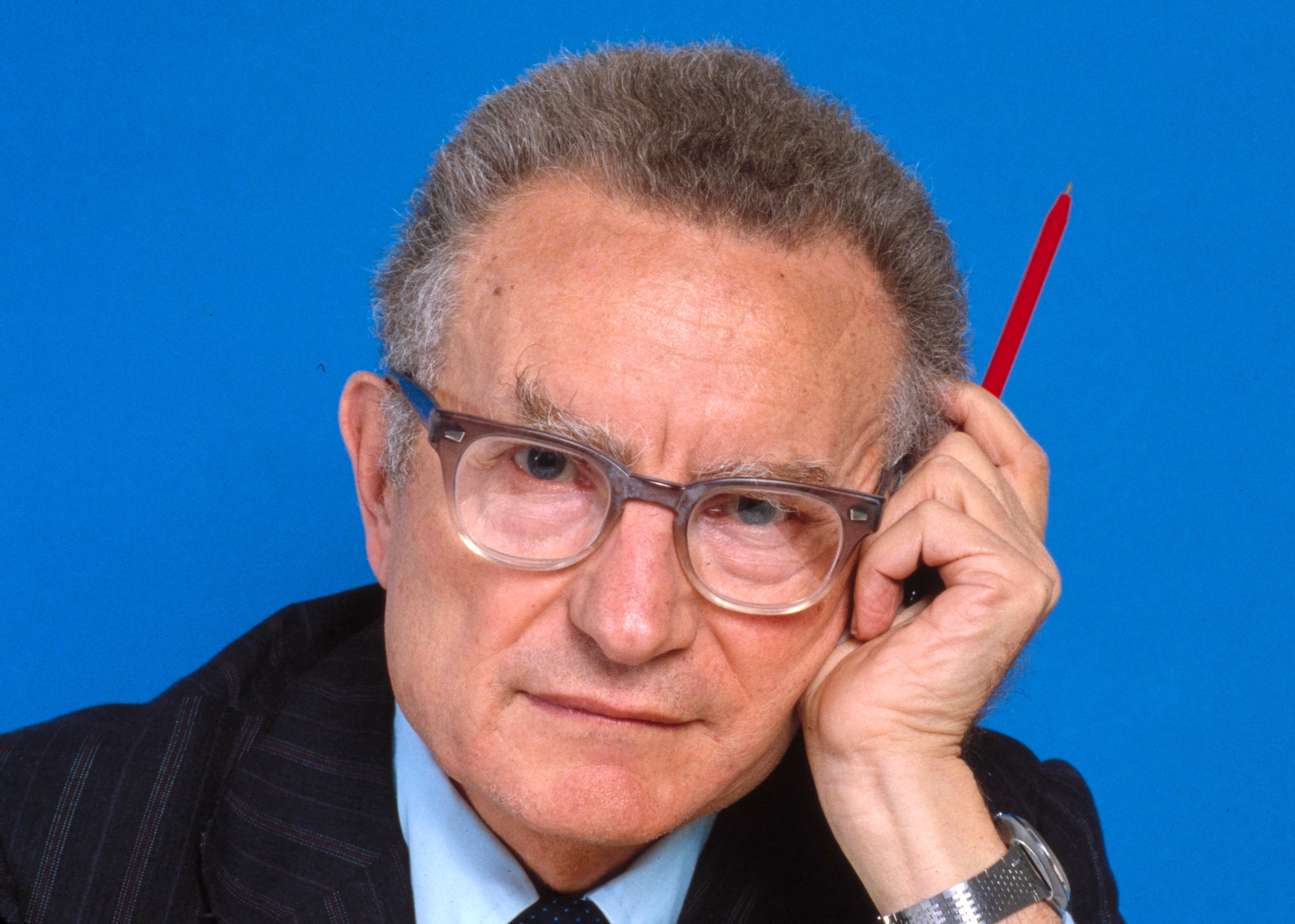
Paul Samuelson

- George Akerlof, Nobel Memorial Prize in Economic Sciences (2001)
- Joshua Angrist, Nobel Prize (2021)
- Kenneth Arrow, Nobel Prize (1972)
- Robert Aumann, Nobel Prize (2005)
- Gary Becker, Nobel Prize (1992)
- Ben Bernanke, former Chair of the US Federal Reserve Bank, Nobel Memorial Prize in Economic Sciences (2022)
- Jared Bernstein, in February 2023, President Biden nominated Bernstein to serve as Chair of the Council of Economic Advisers
- Walter Block, Harold E. Wirth Endowed Chair in Economics at Loyola University in New Orleans
- Arthur F. Burns, economic adviser to the Eisenhower administration (1953) and Chairman to the Federal Reserve (1970)
- Peter Diamond, Nobel Memorial Prize in Economic Sciences (2010)
- Martin Feldstein, Harvard professor; Chair of the Council of Economic Advisors in the Reagan Administration, John Bates Clark Medal (1977)
- Amy Finkelstein, Professor of Economics at the Massachusetts Institute of Technology (MIT), John Bates Clark Medal, 2012, Elaine Bennett Research Prize, 2008, co-Director and research associate of the Public Economics Program at the National Bureau of Economic Research, and co-Scientific Director of J-PAL North America.
- Robert Fogel, Nobel Prize (1993)
- Milton Friedman, Nobel Prize (1976), Presidential Medal of Freedom (1988), John Bates Clark Medal (1951)
- Alan Greenspan, former Chair of the US Federal Reserve Bank, Presidential Medal of Freedom, Department of Defense Medal for Distinguished Public Service, Commander of the Legion of Honour (France) (2000), Knight Commander of the Order of the British Empire (United Kingdom) (2002).
- Oliver Hart, Nobel Memorial Prize in Economic Sciences (2016)
- Hendrik S. Houthakker
- Leonid Hurwicz, National Medal of Science (1990), Nobel Memorial Prize (2007)
- Daniel Kahneman, Nobel Prize (2002)
- Lawrence Klein, Nobel Prize (1980)
- Michael Kremer, Nobel Prize in Economics (2019)
- Paul Krugman, Nobel Prize (2008)
- Simon Kuznets, Nobel Prize (1971)
- Wassily Leontief, Nobel Prize (1973)
- Harry Markowitz, Nobel Prize (1990), John von Neumann Theory Prize (1989)
- Eric Maskin, Nobel Prize (2007)
- Robert C. Merton, Nobel Memorial Prize in Economic Sciences (1997)
- Paul Robert Milgrom, Nobel Prize (2021)
- Merton Miller, Nobel Prize (1990)
- Toby Moskowitz, financial economist, Fischer Black Prize (2007)
- Roger Myerson, Nobel Memorial Prize in Economic Sciences (2007)
- William Nordhaus, BBVA Foundation Frontiers of Knowledge Award (2017), Nobel Memorial Prize in Economic Sciences (2018)
- Roy Radner, developed the Radner equilibrium concept
- Alvin E. Roth, Nobel Prize (2012)
- Murray Rothbard, writer, Austrian School, anarcho-capitalist, libertarian writer
- Nouriel Roubini, Iranian-American
- Paul Samuelson, John Bates Clark Medal (1947). Nobel Memorial Prize in Economic Sciences (1970), National Medal of Science (1996)
- Myron Scholes, Nobel Prize (1997)
- Anna Schwartz, published A Monetary History of the United States, 1867–1960 (1963), which laid a large portion of the blame for the Great Depression at the door of the Federal Reserve System. President of the Western Economic Association International (1988)
- Herbert A. Simon, Nobel Prize (1978)
- Robert Solow, Nobel Prize (1987)
- Joseph Stiglitz, Nobel Prize (2001)
- Lawrence Henry Summers, former Chief Economist at the World Bank, John Bates Clark Medal (1993)
- Richard Thaler, Nobel Memorial Prize in Economic Sciences (2017)
- Janet Yellen, economist, former chair of the US Federal Reserve Bank, US Secretary of the Treasury
- Joel Mokyr, long-run economic growth theorist and winner of the Nobel Memorial Prize in Economic Sciences (2025)
