= List of Jewish American historians =

This is a list of notable Jewish American historians. For other Jewish Americans, see Lists of Jewish Americans.

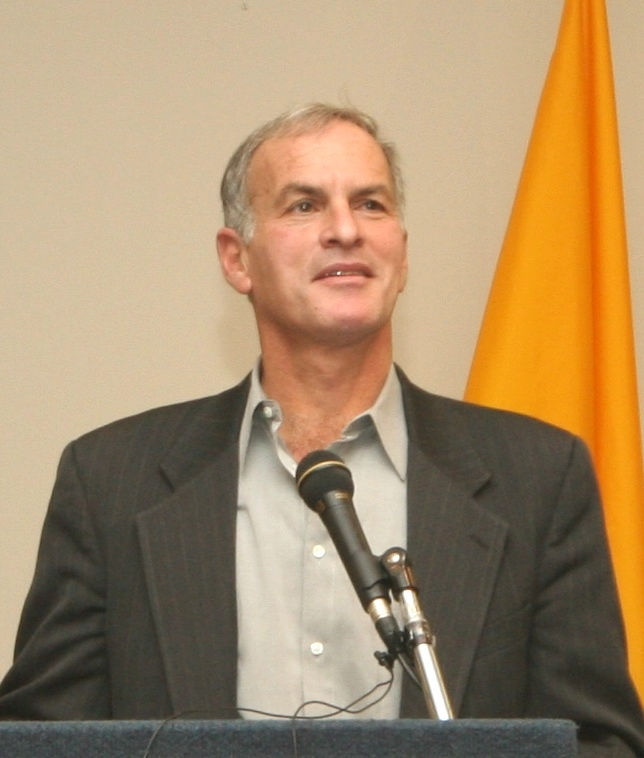
Norman Finkelstein

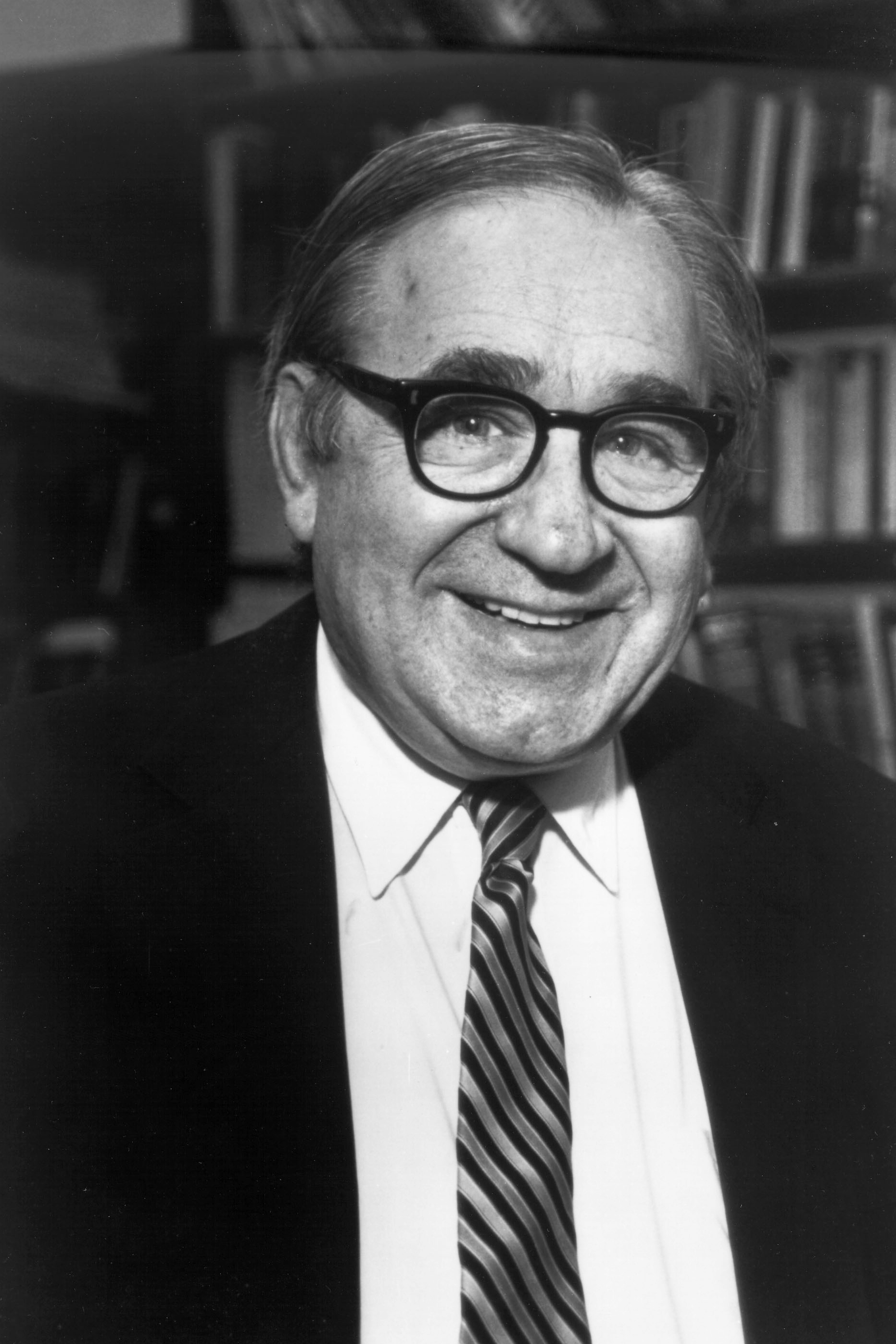
Robert Fogel

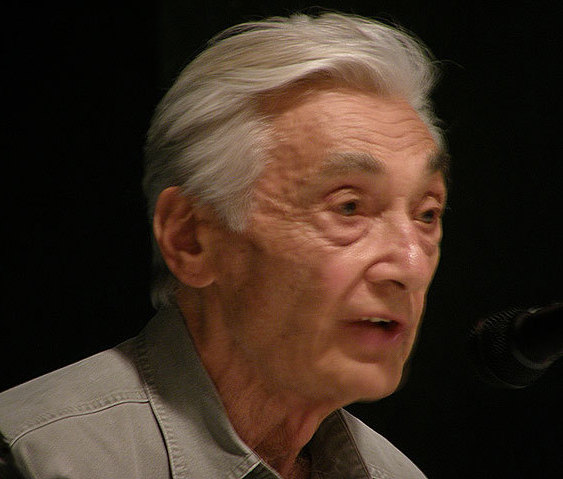
Howard Zinn

- Cyrus Adler
- Herbert Aptheker
- Bernard Bailyn
- Daniel J. Boorstin
- Norman Cantor
- Ariel Durant
- Stanley Elkins
- Richard Ettinghausen, art historian
- Norman Finkelstein, author and historian
- Robert Fogel, economist and historian
- Peter Gay
- Yosef Goldman
- Deborah Hertz
- Raul Hilberg
- Richard Hofstadter
- Joseph Jacobs, editor of the Jewish Encyclopedia
- Gabriel Kolko
- Bernard Lewis
- Deborah Lipstadt
- John Lukacs, Hungarian-born historian
- Erwin Panofsky
- Richard Popkin, historian of philosophy
- Meyer Schapiro
- Rosa Levin Toubin, historian of Jewish Texan history
- Barbara Tuchman
- Stanley M. Wagner, rabbi and academic
- Howard Zinn
