= Abraham Solomon Freidus =

Jewish-American librarian

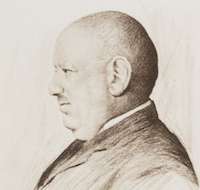
- Freidus engraving by Alexander Dux
- Born: 1866; Riga, Russian Empire
- Died: October 2, 1923 (aged 56–57); New York City, United States
- Occupations: Cataloguer; Librarian; Library administrator

Abraham Solomon Freidus (1866–October 2, 1923) was the first head of the Jewish literature department at the New York Public Library, holding that role from 1897 until his death in 1923. During Freidus's tenure there, the library dramatically expanded its collection of Jewish written works, and Freidus developed a system for organizing those materials that was arguably the first standard for cataloguing Jewish literature in the context of a large library holding. Freidus's classification system remains one of the main alternatives for organizing large collections of Jewish works.

== Early life and education ==
Freidus was born in 1866 in Riga, which was then part of the Russian Empire. He received a religious Jewish education in Riga, before moving to Paris in 1886 to study other topics for three years. There he learned the French language and became interested in the maintenance of books. He moved to New York City in 1889, where he studied at the Pratt Institute School of Information (then the Pratt Institute Library School).

== Career ==
After his training in library cataloguing, Freidus worked as a cataloguer at the General Theological Seminary. On February 23, 1897, he took a job at the New York Public Library. The scholar of Judaism Richard James Horatio Gottheil estimated that the public library then had about 300 books related to Jewish studies, but the month after Freidus joined the library's staff, a collector named A. M. Banks sold a collection of more than 2,000 books to the library. Because of this sudden influx of material, a Jewish literature department was created (the Department of Hebraica and Judaica) at the library, and in November 1897, Freidus was appointed as its head.

Less than a decade later, in 1906, Cyrus Adler and Peter Wiernik estimated that the Jewish literature department at the New York Public Library had grown to contain 15,000 works, which Freidus had divided into 500 categories. He developed an original system for cataloguing these works, which has been called the Abraham Freidus Classification Scheme. Adler and Wiernik wrote that Freidus's system of organizing these materials "may be considered the first elaborate scheme of classifying Jewish literature for library purposes".

In addition to his work as a cataloguer, Freidus also wrote original encyclopedic works. These include exhaustive lists of periodicals and reference texts on various topics in Jewish studies, which he published in outlets like the Jewish Year Book and the bulletin of the American Jewish Historical Society. Joshua Bloch, Freidus's successor as head of the Jewish literature department at the New York Public Library, estimated that Freidus published 28 bibliographic works. The originality of Freidus's scheme, and his reputation for being able to rapidly supply references on Jewish literature, made him a prominent figure in the community of Jewish writers in New York City at the beginning of the 20th century.

Freidus died on October 2, 1923, in New York City.

In 1929, the Alexander Kohut Memorial Foundation published a book on Jewish bibliography that was dedicated to the memory of Freidus, and discussed his life and work.

Freidus's classification scheme remains, alongside alternatives like that of Gershom Scholem, one of the standard options for cataloguing large collections of Jewish written works.
