= Jewish American literature =

Jewish American literature holds an essential place in the literary history of the United States. It encompasses traditions of writing in English, primarily, as well as in other languages, the most important of which has been Yiddish. While critics and authors generally acknowledge the notion of a distinctive corpus and practice of writing about Jewishness in America, many writers resist being pigeonholed as "Jewish voices." Also, many nominally Jewish writers cannot be considered representative of Jewish American literature, one example being Isaac Asimov. Modernism and speculative fiction are major focuses in post-Holocaust Jewish American literature.

== Beginnings ==
Beginning with the memoirs and petitions composed by the Sephardic immigrants who arrived in America during the mid 17th century, Jewish American writing grew over the subsequent centuries to flourish in other genres as well, including fiction, poetry, and drama. The first notable voice in Jewish- American literature was Emma Lazarus, whose poem "The New Colossus" on the Statue of Liberty became the great hymnal of American immigration. Gertrude Stein became one of the most influential prose-stylists of the early 20th century.

The early twentieth century saw the appearance of two pioneering American Jewish novels: Abraham Cahan's "The Rise of David Levinsky" and Henry Roth's "Call It Sleep". It reached some of its most mature expression in the 20th century "Jewish American novels" by Saul Bellow, J. D. Salinger, Norman Mailer, Bernard Malamud, Chaim Potok, and Philip Roth. Their work explored the conflicting pulls between secular society and Jewish tradition which were acutely felt by the immigrants who passed through Ellis Island and by their children and grandchildren.

== Present day ==
More recent authors like Paul Auster, Michael Chabon, Ayelet Waldman, Joshua Cohen, Helen Epstein, Jonathan Safran Foer, Alan Kaufman, Nicole Krauss, Lev Raphael, and Art Spiegelman have continued to examine dilemmas of identity in their work, turning their attention especially to the Holocaust and the trends of both ongoing assimilation and cultural rediscovery exhibited by younger generations of American Jews. Arguably the most influential of all American Jewish novels was Leon Uris' Exodus. Its story of the struggle to create the modern state of Israel translated into Russian became the inspiration for hundreds of thousands of Russian immigrants to Israel. Modern Jewish American novels often contain (a few or many) Jewish characters and address issues and themes of importance to Jewish American society such as assimilation, Zionism/Israel, and antisemitism, along with the recent phenomenon known as "New antisemitism."

Four Jewish-American writers have won the Nobel Prize in Literature: Saul Bellow, Joseph Brodsky, Bob Dylan, and Isaac Bashevis Singer. Magazines such as The New Yorker have proved to be instrumental in exposing many Jewish American writers to a wider reading public.

=== Modernism ===
Modernism is a critical component to contemporary Jewish American literature. Fleeing the persecution of pogroms and anti-Semitic policies in Europe, two million Jews settled in the United States between 1880 and 1924, marking a significant cultural break with the past. Themes in modern Jewish American literature expresses the difficulties of assimilation: while Jewish-Americans embraced American identity, they sought a decidedly Jewish approach to their literature. Books like Saul Bellow's Dangling Man portrays the difficulty of assimilation and adapting to materialist urban consciousness.

Post-1945 Jewish-American literature embrace approaches to writing centered in the postmodern. Didacticism, or telling stories for the purpose of teaching a moral lesson, is important to the writers Meyer Liben, Lionel Trilling, and Delmore Schwartz, who interweave Jewish philosophical discussion with self-identity as a basis for critiquing post-war America. For instance, Liben adopts a meta-fiction as a means of exploring art and sensibility and their connection with Jewish identity. Self-portraiture is another way Jewish-American writers confront identity, with Robert Mezy and Henry Roth investigating the conflicts between secular and religious life, English against Hebrew and Yiddish, and community transcending language. Since the 1960s, different facets of Judaism, such as the orthodox, reform, and secular, are further stratified and entangled through the works of Saul Bellow and Chaim Potok. These forms of literature are partly in response to antisemitism, reclaiming the tropes and histories that instigated the exodus to The United States, and ultimately transforming language to reflect the experiences of the Jewish diaspora.

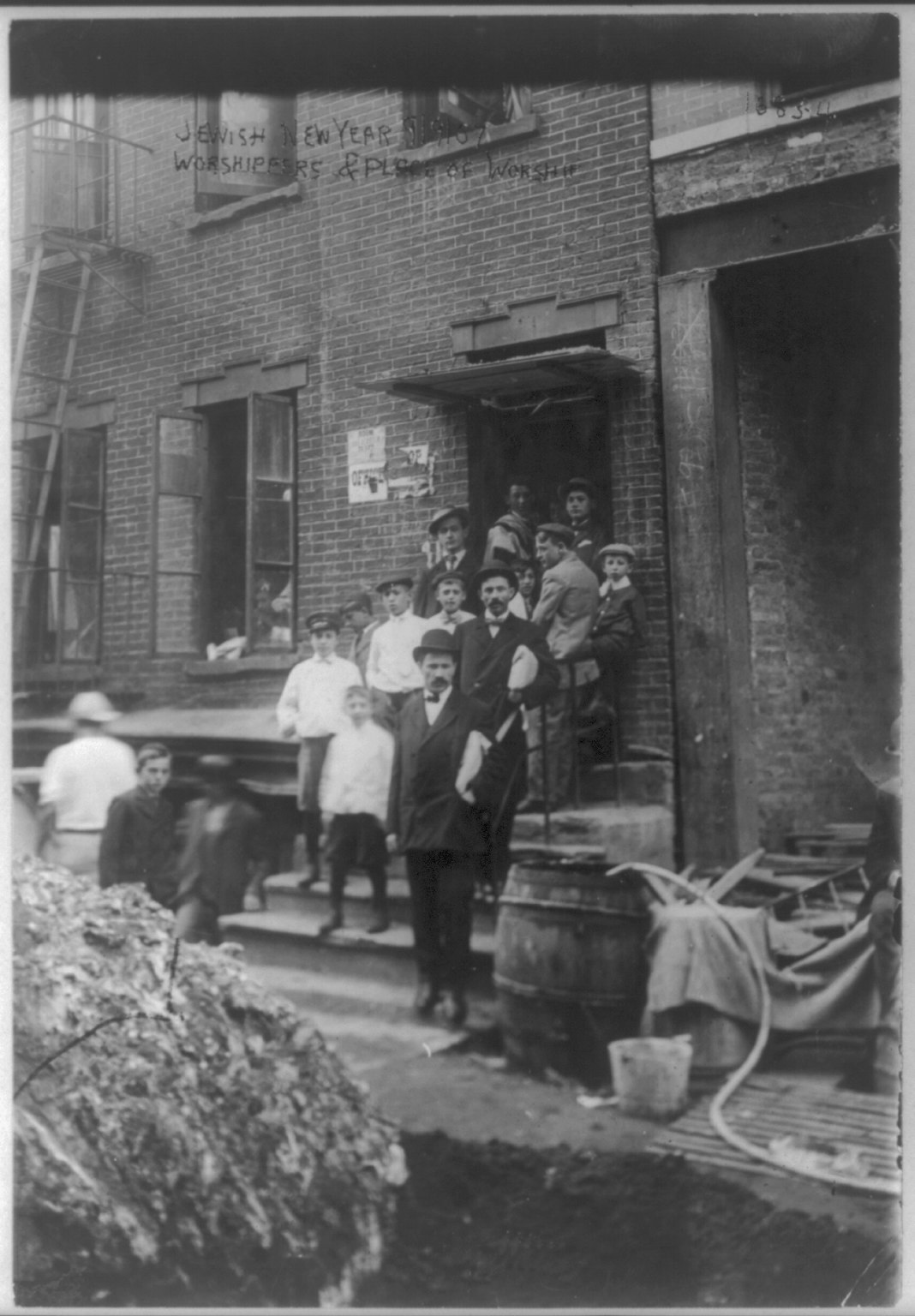
Jewish residents of New York City celebrate the Jewish New Year in a tenement converted into a synagogue.

Modernism in Jewish American Literature shows how Jewish immigrants struggled with adjusting to American life and values, as well as their impact on personal identity. Saul Bellow's “Dangling Man” expresses these themes, noting how difficult it is to adapt to another way of life, with little to no preparation, while trying to hold on to traditions and beliefs. After 1945, writers like Meyer Liben and Lionel Trilling fully took on postmodern ideas, using Jewish philosophy with some critiquing of America post- World War 2. Even in the works of Robert Mezy and Henry Roth we see themes of self-portraiture, while also diving into topics of religion and secularism. The works of Michael Chabon and Johnathan Safran Foer, uses Jewish speculative literature, and reimagines Jewish identity, all the while dissociating from Israel to show what it means to be a survivor of the Holocaust, and challenge the tropes of Jewish tradition.

== Stereotypes of Jewish People ==
Although Jewish stereotypes first appeared in works by non-Jewish writers, after World War II, it was often Jewish American writers themselves who evoked such fixed images. The prevalence of antisemitic stereotypes in the works of such authors has sometimes been interpreted an expression of self-hatred; however, Jewish American authors have also invoked these negative stereotypes in an effort to refute them.

However, American-Jewish literature has also strongly celebrated American life. It has been primarily more an American than a Jewish literature. Perhaps the preeminent example of this is the great breakthrough novel of Saul Bellow: The Adventures of Augie March.

According to Sanford V. Sternlicht, the first generation of Jewish-American authors presented "realistic portrayals - warts and all" of Jewish immigrants. In contrast, some second or third-generation Jewish-American authors deliberately "reinforced negative stereotypes with satire and a selective realism".

== Speculative Literature ==
Speculative genres, like fantasy and science fiction, are important in post-Holocaust Jewish American literature. However, science fiction produced by a Jewish writer does not automatically suggest a work of "Jewish science fiction," as it should concern issues of Jewishness or feature prominent Jewish characters. For example, Isaac Asimov is an iconic science fiction writer with a Jewish background, yet his stories do not necessarily contain a Jewish element to them. Examples of foundational speculative Jewish literature include Michael Chabon's 2007 book, The Yiddish Policeman's Union, and Jonathan Safran Foer's 2016 novel, Here I Am. Nonetheless, the earliest science fiction writers were New York Jews, including Jerry Sigel and Joe Shuster. These early science fiction Jewish writers based in New York City led to works like Iron Man and I, Robot, having tremendous influence on the trajectory of speculative literature.

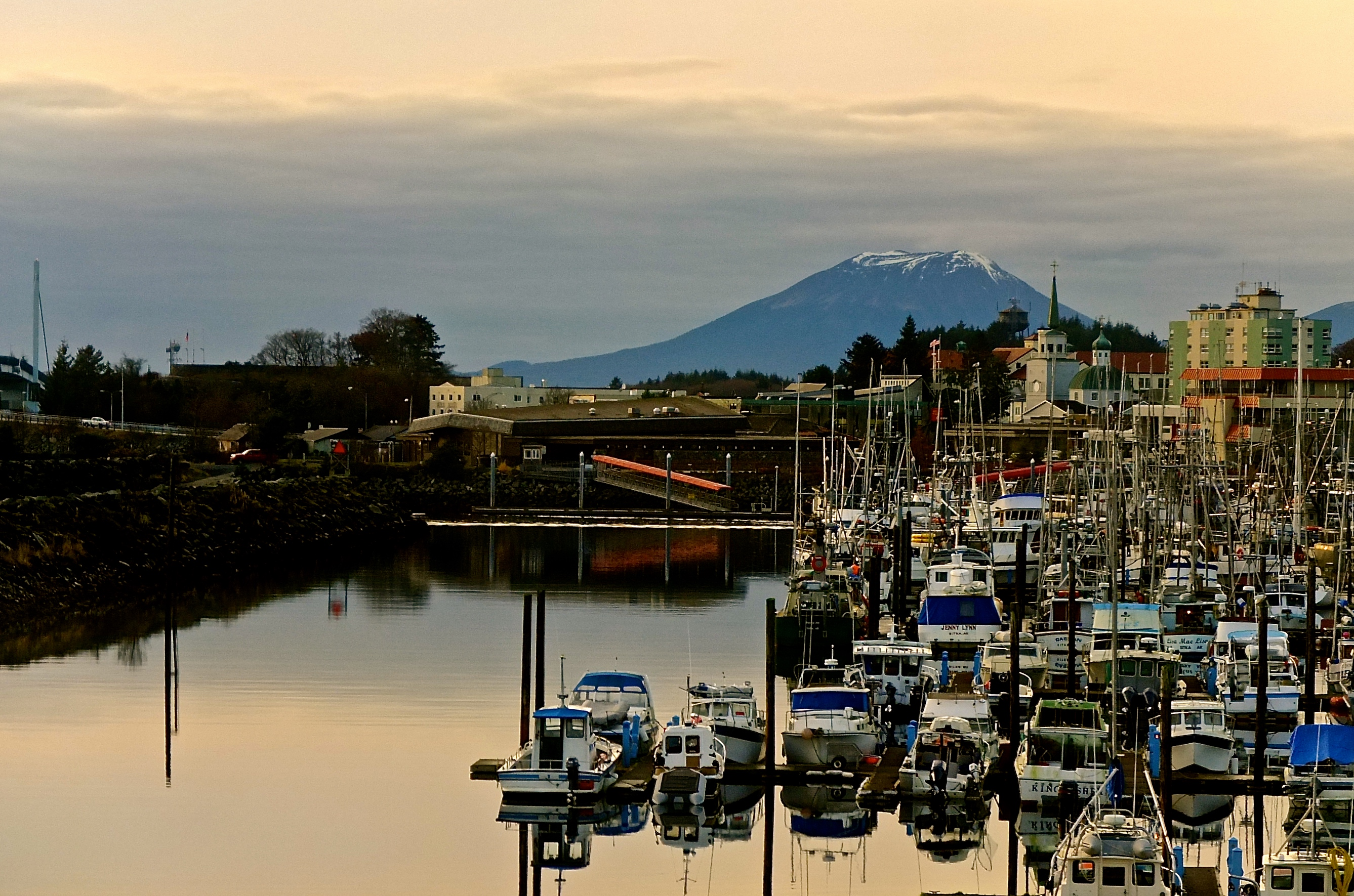
Michael Chabon's book, The Yiddish Policemen's Union, imagines an alternate history where Israel is destroyed in the 1950s and Sitka, Alaska becomes the world's foremost Jewish city.

A core theme in Jewish speculative literature is the literal and metaphorical destruction of Israel. American Jewish writers often depict Israelis in a disparaging manner, as Zionistic idealism is converted to aggressive self-righteousness targeting minorities, featuring the moral and political crisis in the country. Yet, Israel remains a symbol of Jewish power and independence. In response, Jewish-American writers have marked a disassociation from Israel and Israeli Jews in an effort to redefine post-Holocaust identity. Chabon's The Yiddish Policeman's Union, for instance, imagines a reality where Israel is destroyed soon after its formation, and Jews establish a homeland in Alaska with Yiddish as the central language. Chabon's book challenges the trope of suffering Jew and images of ghettos and concentration camps by creating a "tough Jew" character, along with presenting Jews as mobsters, swordsmen, and American soldiers, intentionally refraining from the Israeli Jew framework. In this way, Jewish American writers have sought to liberate themselves from being defined around Israel, despite its wide-reaching influence.

== See also ==
- American literature
- Literature of Chicago
- Early English Jewish literature
- Hebrew literature
- Ladino literature
- List of Jewish American authors
- List of Jewish American playwrights
- List of Jewish American poets
- Secular Jewish culture
- Yiddish literature
