= David Einstein =

American artist

David Einstein (born 1946, Detroit, Michigan) is an American artist based in Palm Springs, California.

== Education ==
In 1968 Einstein received a Bachelor of Arts degree from Oakland University and in 1972 he received a Master of Fine Arts degree from Wayne State University.

In 1970 Einstein attended Skowhegan School of Painting and Sculpture.

Einstein is professor Emeritus at College of the Desert in Palm Desert, California. He has also taught at Birmingham Bloomfield Art Center, Oakland Community College and Wayne State University.

== Exhibitions ==
Einstein has participated in numerous exhibitions in art galleries and museums. His 50 year retrospective was held at the Triton Museum of Art in 2018. Einstein has had solo exhibitions at The University of Windsor, Hansen Galleries, Little Gallery, Michael H. Lord Gallery, Lawrence Fine Art, Addison Rowe Gallery, East and Peggy Phelps Galleries. Einstein's work has been exhibited in group exhibitions at Crocker Art Museum, Autry Museum of the American West, Palm Springs Art Museum, B'nai B'rith Klutznick National Jewish Museum, and Cranbrook Art Museum.

== Collections ==
- Albuquerque Museum of Art and History, Albuquerque, NM
- Autry Museum of the American West, Los Angeles, Los Angeles, CA
- B'nai B'rith Klutznick National Jewish Museum, Washington, D.C
- Crocker Art Museum, Sacramento, CA
- Denver Art Museum, Denver, CO
- Nerman Museum of Contemporary Art, Johnson County, KS.
- The Newark Museum of Art, Newark, NJ
- Oakland University, Rochester, MI
- Palm Springs Art Museum, Palm Springs, CA
- Philbrook Museum of Art, Tulsa, OK
- Triton Museum of Art, Santa Clara, CA

Selected ARTLIFE edition pages in various museums, private and educational institutions such as:

- Getty Museum Book Art Collection, Santa Monica, CA
- Museum of Modern Art Library, New York, NY
- Weisman Art Museum, Minneapolis, MN
- Yale University, Art/Architecture Library & Art of the Book Collection, New Haven, CT
