= List of Jewish American authors =

This is an alphabetical, referenced list of notable Jewish American authors. For other Jewish Americans, see Lists of American Jews.

== A–C ==
- Renata Adler, journalist, critic, novelist
- Warren Adler, novelist (The War of the Roses), short-story writer
- Mary Antin, memoirist (The Promised Land)
- Molly Antopol, short-story writer; 2014 National Book Award nominee
- Jacob M. Appel, novelist (The Man Who Wouldn't Stand Up), short-story writer (Einstein's Beach House collection)
- Max Apple, novelist, short-story writer
- Sholem Asch, novelist, essayist, playwright
- Isaac Asimov, novelist, short-story writer, prolific author of nonfiction; known for his science-fiction works about robots and for writing books in nine of the ten categories of the Dewey Decimal Classification
- Shalom Auslander, novelist
- Paul Auster, novelist
- Dorothy Walter Baruch, author, child psychologist
- Jonathan Baumbach
- Saul Bellow, novelist; winner, Pulitzer Prize, the Nobel Prize in Literature, and the National Medal of Arts
- Aimee Bender, novelist, short-story writer; known for her often fantastic and surreal plots and characters
- Rosebud Ben-Oni, winner, the Alice James Award (for If This Is the Age We End Discovery)
- Harold Bloom, literary critic
- Judy Blume, children's author
- Agnes Borinsky, young-adult author, playwright
- Shmuley Boteach, author of over thirty nonfiction books, including Kosher Sex: A Recipe for Passion and Intimacy and Kosher Jesus
- Joshua Braff, novelist
- Melvin Jules Bukiet, novelist
- Abraham Cahan, writer (including journalist); editor of Yiddish newspaper Jewish Daily Forward
- Hortense Calisher, novelist; president, American Academy of Arts and Letters
- Raphael Hayyim Isaac Carregal, colonial-era rabbi who published the first Jewish sermons in America
- Michael Chabon, novelist, short-story writer; winner, 2001 Pulitzer Prize (for The Amazing Adventures of Kavalier & Clay)
- Arthur A. Cohen, novelist
- Joshua Cohen, novelist (Witz)
- Bernard Cooper, novelist, short-story writer

== D–F ==
- Edward Dahlberg, novelist, essayist
- Anita Diamant, non-fiction writer (including journalist), novelist (The Red Tent)
- E. L. Doctorow, novelist
- Bob Dylan, singer-songwriter; often regarded as one of the greatest songwriters of all time; winner, Nobel Prize in Literature 2016
- Joel Eisenberg, screenwriter, producer, novelist (co-wrote, with Steve Hillard, The Chronicles of Ara fantasy series)
- Stanley Elkin, novelist, essayist
- Richard Elman, novelist, journalist
- Nathan Englander, short-story writer, novelist; finalist, Pulitzer Prize
- Nora Ephron, journalist, screenwriter
- Marcia Falk, poet, liturgist, painter, translator
- Preston Fassel, novelist, biographer, screenwriter
- Kenneth Fearing, novelist, editor, poet
- Edna Ferber, Pulitzer Prize–winning novelist
- Barthold Fles, literary agent, non-fiction writer
- Jonathan Safran Foer, novelist
- Bruce Jay Friedman, novelist
- Kinky Friedman, novelist, musician
- Sanford Friedman, novelist
- Abraham Solomon Freidus, author of bibliographic and library works
- Daniel Fuchs, novelist, screenwriter, essayist

== G–J ==
- Jacob Geller, video-game critic
- Herbert Gold, novelist
- Mike Gold, communist novelist, literary critic
- Emma Goldman, anarchist writer
- Paul Goodman, social critic and author of Growing Up Absurd
- Vivian Gornick, essayist
- Rebecca Gratz, educator, journalist
- Gerald Green, author, including journalist
- Joseph Heller, novelist (Catch-22)
- Christopher Hitchens, literary critic, political activist
- Alice Hoffman, novelist, author of Practical Magic, and thirty-odd other books.
- Irving Howe, literary critic
- Horace Kallen, author, philosopher and academic
- Ben Joravsky, American newspaper columnist, author

== K–M ==
- Daniel Keyes, novelist (Flowers for Algernon); teacher
- Nicole Krauss, novelist
- Emma Lazarus, poet, novelist
- Jane Leavy, sportswriter, biographer
- Fran Lebowitz, author (including humorist), public speaker
- Isaac Leeser, author, publisher
- Julius Lester, author, academic; African-American convert to Judaism
- Meyer Levin, novelist, journalist
- Ludwig Lewisohn, novelist, essayist, editor
- Seymour Martin Lipset, political sociologist
- Norman Mailer, novelist, journalist
- Bernard Malamud, Pulitzer Prize–winning author
- David Mamet, Pulitzer Prize–, Academy Award–, Golden Globe–, and Tony Award–winning author
- Wallace Markfield, novelist
- Theresa Malkiel, novelist, socialist activist
- Wallace Markfield, novelist
- Brad Meltzer, novelist
- Walter Mosley, crime novelist

== N–R ==
- Reggie Nadelson, novelist; known particularly for her mystery works
- Moyshe Nadir, writer, including journalist
- Mordecai Manuel Noah, journalist, playwright, diplomat
- Joseph Opatoshu, novelist, short-story writer
- Cynthia Ozick, novelist, essayist
- Leo Pearlstein, food writer
- S. J. Perelman, Academy Award–winning screenwriter, novelist
- Jodi Picoult, novelist
- Marge Piercy, novelist, short-story writer
- Belva Plain, novelist
- Chaim Potok, novelist, rabbi
- Nathan Raab, author, including historian
- Ayn Rand, novelist; founder of Objectivism
- Lev Raphael, novelist, essayist
- Lea Bayers Rapp, non-fiction writer, children's fiction writer
- Marcus Eli Ravage, memoirist, essayist, biographer; author of An American in the Making, The Jew Pays and others
- Avrom Reyzen, autobiographer, editor, poet, short-story writer
- Frank Rich, essayist, journalist
- Nathaniel Rich, essayist, novelist
- Simon Rich, humorist, short-story writer, novelist
- Isaac Rosenfeld, essayist, short-story writer, novelist
- Leo Rosten, humorist, lexicographer
- Norman Rosten, novelist
- Henry Roth, novelist, short-story writer
- Philip Roth, known for autobiographical fiction
- M. A. Rothman, inventor, speculative-fiction writer

== S–Z ==
- Peter Sagal, writer, including humorist
- J. D. Salinger, short-story writer, novelist (The Catcher in the Rye)
- Nachman Seltzer, novelist, short-story writer, biographer
- Yente Serdatzky, short-story writer, playwright
- Lemony Snicket (pen name of Daniel Handler), novelist (A Series of Unfortunate Events, a series of children's novels)
- Lamed Shapiro, short-story writer
- Irwin Shaw, novelist, screenwriter, playwright
- Gary Shteyngart (born 1972), Russian-born writer
- Mordechai Sheftal, diarist; officer in the Continental Army
- Isaac Bashevis Singer, Yiddish-language novelist and journalist; Nobel Prize winner
- Tess Slesinger, novelist, screenwriter
- Susan Sontag, essayist, novelist
- Gertrude Stein, novelist and patron of the arts
- George Steiner (1929–2020), literary critic
- Daniel Stern, novelist
- Louise Stern, novelist, playwright
- Richard G. Stern, novelist, academic
- Samuel Sattin (born 1982), essayist, writer of the OEL Manga series Unico, a reboot of Osamu Tezuka's Unico franchise
- Steve Stern, novelist and short-story writer; work draws heavily on Jewish folklore and the immigrant experience; winner of the National Jewish Book Award
- Harvey Swados, novelist, essayist
- Judd L. Teller, writer, including historian, journaliat, poet
- Jonathan Tropper, novelist
- Leopold Tyrmand, writer
- Leon Uris, novelist
- Judith Viorst (born 1932), children's writer
- Edward Lewis Wallant, novelist
- Jerome Weidman, novelist, playwright
- Sadie Rose Weilerstein (1894–1993), author of children's books, including the K'tonton stories about the adventures of a thumb-sized boy
- Nathanael West, novelist and screenwriter
- Elie Wiesel, Holocaust survivor, Nobel Prize winner and author of fifty-seven books
- Isaac Meyer Wise, author and rabbi
- Victoria Wolff (1903–1992), German-born American writer, including novelist and screenwriter
- Herman Wouk, Pulitzer Prize–winning novelist
- Anzia Yezierska, novelist

== See also ==
- Jewish American literature
- Multi-ethnic literature of the United States
- Before Columbus Foundation
