= Cheryl Moch =

American dramatist

Cheryl Moch was a founding board member of the Jewish feminist organization (JFO). She is a writer and playwright, living in New York City with her daughter Hannah. Her play, Cinderella, the Real True Story, which celebrates gay marriage, has been performed around the world. Moch designed the poster for the Jewish Students' Network's 1974 National Conference on Jewish Women and Men, and shot all of the portraits. The two older women included in the poster are her mother, Ethel Moch, and her grandmother, Stella Moch.
