= List of Jewish American biologists and physicians =

This is a list of notable Jewish American biologists and physicians. For other Jewish Americans, see Lists of Jewish Americans.

- David Baltimore, reverse transcriptase, Nobel Prize (1975)
- Baruj Benacerraf, immunologist, Nobel Prize (1980)
- Baruch Blumberg, hepatitis B virus, Nobel Prize (1976)
- Gerty Cori, biochemist, Nobel Prize (1947)
- Gertrude Elion, drug development, Nobel Prize (1988)
- Stanley Falkow, "father of molecular microbial pathogenesis", National Medal of Science (2016)
- Alfred G. Gilman, biochemist, Nobel Prize (1994)
- H. Robert Horvitz, biologist, Nobel Prize (2002)
- David Julius, nociception, Nobel Prize (2021)
- Eric Kandel, biologist, Nobel Prize (2000)
- C. Henry Kempe, physician, first to identify and recognize child abuse
- Arthur Kornberg, DNA replication, Nobel Prize (1959)
- Alisha Kramer, physician and health activist
- Esther Lederberg, geneticist
- Fritz Lipmann, coenzyme A, Nobel Prize (1953)
- Hermann Muller, geneticist, Nobel Prize (1946) (Jewish mother)
- Daniel Nathans, microbiologist, Nobel Prize (1978)
- Jonas Salk, polio vaccine
- Howard Temin, reverse transcriptase, Nobel Prize (1975)
- George Wald, retina pigmentation, Nobel Prize (1967).
- Bret Weinstein, evolutionary biologist
