= Radner equilibrium =

Radner equilibrium is an economic concept defined by economist Roy Radner in the context of general equilibrium. The concept is an extension of the Arrow–Debreu equilibrium and the base for the first consistent incomplete markets framework.

The concept departs from the Arrow-Debreu framework in two ways:

1. Uncertainty is explicitly modeled through a tree structure (or equivalent filtration) rendering passage of time and resolution of uncertainty explicit.
2. Budget feasibility is no longer defined as affordability but through explicit trading of financial instruments. Financial instruments are used to allow insurance and inter-temporal wealth transfers across spot markets at each nodes of the tree. Economic agents face a sequence of budget sets, one at each date-state.

Item (2) introduces the concept of incomplete markets, formulated in terms of net trade, the budget set is contained in a half space intersecting the positive cone of contingent goods at zero net trade only (this is called absence of arbitrage). This is because without transaction cost agents will demand an infinite amount of any trade promising positive consumption in some state and no negative net trade against that in any other good and state. This half space, containing the budget set and separating it from the free lunch cone, corresponds to a half line of positive prices. However potentially if not enough instruments are present, the full half space may not be spanned by trading the instruments and the budgets set may be strictly smaller. In such a configuration markets are said to be incomplete, and there are several ways to separate the budget set from the positive cone (sometimes called the free-lunch cone). This means that several price systems become admissible.

At a Radner equilibrium like the Arrow–Debreu equilibrium under uncertainty, perfect consensual foresight is used. It is what is called a rational expectation model.
