= Roy Radner =

American economist (1927-2022)

- Born: June 29, 1927; Chicago, Illinois, U.S.
- Died: October 6, 2022 (aged 95); Newtown, Bucks County, Pennsylvania, U.S.
- Education: University of Chicago
- Scientific career
- Fields: Mathematical economics
- Workplaces: Yale University; University of California, Berkeley; New York University
- Thesis: Team Decision Functions (1956)
- Doctoral advisor: Leonard Jimmie Savage

Roy Radner (June 29, 1927 – October 6, 2022) was Leonard N. Stern School Professor of Business at New York University. He was a micro-economic theorist. Radner's research interests included strategic analysis of climate change, bounded rationality, game-theoretic models of corruption, pricing of information goods and statistical theory of data mining. Previously he was a faculty member at the University of California, Berkeley, and a Distinguished Member of Technical Staff at AT&T Bell Laboratories.

== Life and career ==
Roy Radner received his Ph.B. in the liberal arts from the University of Chicago in 1945. Continuing his education at the University of Chicago, Radner went on to receive a B.S. in mathematics in 1950, an M.S. in mathematics in 1951, and his Ph.D. in mathematical statistics in 1956. He died on October 6, 2022, at Pennswood Village in Newtown, Bucks County, Pennsylvania, aged 95.

== Radner equilibrium ==
Among Radner's various contributions, the one that bears his name, Radner equilibrium (1968), is a model of financial markets. In the traditional approach if the value of an asset or a contingent claim is affordable then it can be achieved. Not so with incomplete market as the payoff has to be replicable by trading of available assets that are now part of the definition of the economy. The first consequence of such a requirement is that budget sets do not fill the available space and are typically smaller than hyperplanes. Because the dimension of vectors orthogonal to the budget set is larger than one there is no reason for the price systems supporting an equilibrium to be unique up to scaling, likewise the first order conditions no longer implies that gradient of agents are collinear at equilibrium. Both happen to fail to hold generically: the first theorem of welfare economics is hence the first victim of incompleteness. Pareto-optimality of equilibria generally does not hold. In traditional complete markets any policy would be undone through trading of rational expectation agents. This is no longer the case with incomplete markets as such policy-neutralising trading is no longer necessarily possible. Various policies (tax-related, monetary, etc. ) have an effect when introduced when markets are incomplete. Additionally incompleteness opens the door for a theory of financial innovation with real impact. This was not possible in the traditional complete market general equilibrium model as any contingent claim could be replicated by trading and financial innovation would have no real effect.

== Awards and recognition ==
- Member of the U.S. National Academy of Sciences and the American Academy of Arts and Sciences
- Distinguished Fellow of the American Economics Association and the American Association for the Advancement of Science
- Fellow of the Society for the Advancement of Economic Theory
- Fellow and Past-President of the Econometric Society

== Selected bibliography ==
Books

- Jorgenson, Dale Weldeau; McCall, John Joseph; Radner, Roy (1967). Optimal Replacement Policy. North-Holland Publishing Company. ISBN 978-0-444-10728-2.
- Radner, Roy; McGuire, C.B., eds. (1972). Decision and organization: a volume in honor of Jacob Marschak. Studies in Mathematical and Managerial Economics Series (volume 12). Amsterdam: North-Holland Pub. Co. ISBN 978-0-7204-3313-5.
- Marschak, Jacob; Radner, Roy (1972). Economic theory of teams. Cowles Foundation for Research in Economics at Yale University. New Haven London: Yale University Press. ISBN 978-0-300-01279-8.
- Groves, Theodore; Radner, Roy; Reiter, Stanley, eds. (1987). Information, Incentives, and Economic Mechanisms: Essays in Honor of Leonid Hurwicz. U of Minnesota Press. ISBN 978-1-4529-0804-5.

Journal articles

- Radner, Roy; Hurwicz, Leonid; Reiter, Stanley (March 1975). "A stochastic decentralized resource allocation process: Part I". Econometrica. 43 (2): 187–221. doi:10.2307/1913581. JSTOR 1913581. Cowles Commission Discussion Paper: Economics No. 2112, (pdf).
