= Lists of Jews =

This list of lists may include both lists that distinguish between ethnic origin and religious practice, and lists that make no such distinction. Some of the constituent lists also may have experienced additions and/or deletions that reflect incompatible approaches in this regard.

== By type ==
- List of converts to Judaism
- List of European Jewish nobility
- List of fictional Jews
- List of former Jews
- List of Jewish biblical figures
- List of Jewish Nobel laureates
- List of Karaite Jews
- List of LGBT Jews
- List of Sephardic Jews
- Lists of Jews associated with literature and journalism
- List of Jewish Immigrants to the Land of Israel

== By occupation or activity in Judaism ==
- List of Jewish Kabbalists
- List of Jewish mysticism scholars
- List of Jews in religion
  - List of High Priests of Israel
  - List of Jewish atheists and agnostics
  - List of rabbis

== By secular occupation or activity ==
- List of Jewish anarchists
- List of Jewish chess players
- List of Jewish economists
- List of Jewish feminists
- List of Jewish historians
- List of Jewish mathematicians
- List of Jewish scientists
- List of Jewish United States Supreme Court justices
- List of Jews in politics
- List of Jews in sports
- List of Jews in the performing arts
  - List of Jewish actors
  - List of Jewish musicians
- Lists of Jews associated with the visual arts

== By country or region ==
- Lists of American Jews
- List of African-American Jews
- List of Argentine Jews
- List of Austrian Jews
- List of Azerbaijani Jews
- List of Jews from the Arab world
- List of Asian Jews
- List of Belarusian Jews
- List of Bosnian Jews
- List of British Jews
- List of Canadian Jews
- List of Caribbean Jews
- List of Chilean Jews
- List of Czech and Slovak Jews
- List of East European Jews
- List of French Jews
- List of German Jews
- List of Galician (Eastern Europe) Jews
- List of Hungarian Jews
- List of Iberian Jews
- List of Jews born in the Russian Empire and the Soviet Union
- List of Jews from Sub-Saharan Africa
- List of Latin American Jews
- List of Mexican Jews
- List of North European Jews
- List of Oceanian Jews
- List of Polish Jews
- List of Romanian Jews
- List of Romanian Jews in Israel
- List of South European Jews
- List of South-East European Jews
- List of Ukrainian Jews
- List of West European Jews

== See also ==
- Crypto-Judaism
- Jewish religious movements
- List of fictional clergy and religious figures § Judaism
