= List of Jewish scientists =

This is a list of Category:Jewish scientists by country.

== Australia ==
- Australian Jewish academics

== Austria ==
- Austrian Jewish scientists

== Benelux ==
- Dutch Jewish academics

== Brazil ==
- Brazilian Jewish scientists

== Canada ==
- Canadian Jewish academics

== Czechoslovakia ==
- Czech and Slovak Jewish scientists

== France ==
- French Jewish scientists

== Germany ==
- List of German Jewish scientists

== Hungary ==
- Hungarian Jewish scientists

== Israel ==
- Israeli scientists

== Italy ==
- Italian Jewish academics

== Poland ==
- Polish Jewish scientists

== Russia/Soviet Union (including Ukraine) ==
- Russian & Soviet Jewish scientists

== Scandinavia ==
- List of North European Jews

== United Kingdom ==
- List of British Jewish scientists

=== Scotland ===
- List of Scottish Jews#Academic figures and scientists

== Ukraine ==
- Ukrainian Jewish scientists

== United States ==
- Jewish American academics
- Jewish American scientists

== See also ==
- Lists of Jews
- Category:Jewish scientists
- List of Jewish Nobel laureates
