= List of Polish rabbis =

This is a list of Polish rabbis, who either lived in Poland or were born there.

== Hassidism ==
The rise of Hasidic Judaism within Poland's borders and beyond has had a great influence on the rise of neo-Haredi Judaism all over the world, with a continuous influence that has been felt from the inception of the Hasidic movements and its dynasties by famous rebbes until the present time. The following are noteworthy:

- Aleksander Hasidism
- Belz Hasidism
- Bobov Hasidism
- Ger Hasidism
- Nadvorna Hasidism
- Sassov Hasidism

== Polish Rabbis ==
Some famous Polish and Polish-born rabbis include:

- Avraham Mordechai Alter, 4th Gerer Rebbe (the Imrei Emes)
- Pinchas Menachem Alter, 7th Gerer Rebbe (the Pnei Menachem)
- Simcha Bunim Alter, 6th Gerer Rebbe (the Lev Simchah)
- Yehudah Aryeh Leib Alter, 3rd Gerer Rebbe (the Sfas Emes)
- Yaakov Aryeh Alter, 8th (and current) Gerer Rebbe ()
- Yitzchak Meir Alter, 1st Gerer Rebbe (the Chidushei HaRim)
- Baruch Ashlag ()
- Yehuda Ashlag ()
- Zvi Hirsch Chajes ()
- Avraham Danzig ()
- Elimelech of Lizhensk ()
- Joshua Falk ()
- Yaakov Gesundheit ()
- Avraham Gombiner ()
- Kalonymus Haberkasten ()
- Yitzchok Hutner ()
- Pinchas Menachem Justman (the Sifsei Tzadik)
- Yisrael Meir Lau (later Chief Rabbi of Israel)
- Menachem Mendel of Kotzk ()
- Shlomo Hakohen Rabinowicz, first Radomsker Rebbe ()
- Shlomo Chanoch Hakohen Rabinowicz, fourth Radomsker Rebbe ()
- Shalom Rokeach of Belz ()
- Yaakov Yitzchak of Lublin ()

== Rabbis philosophers born on Posen, West Prussia, etc ==
- Ismar Elbogen
- Abraham Joshua Heschel
- Samuel Holdheim
- Kaufmann Kohler
- Moritz Lazarus
- Hermann Tietz (rabbi)
- Joseph Case

See also List of German Jews;

== Rabbis and philosophers born in Austrian Galicia ==
- Rabbi Jacob Avigdor
- Rabbi Salo Wittmayer Baron
- Salomon Buber
- Zwi Perez Chajes
- Rebbe Aharon Rokeach of Belz
- Rebbe Shalom Rokeach of Belz
- Rebbe Yissachar Dov Rokeach of Belz
- Friedrich Weinreb

See also List of Austrian Jews;

== Rabbis philosophers born on Silesia, Brandenburg, Pomerania & Eastern Prussia ==
- See List of German Jews;

== See also ==
- List of Polish Jews, List of North European Jews (Lithuania, etc), List of East European Jews (Southern Lithuania - Belarus), List of Ukrainian Jews (Ukraine - Galicia, Volhynia, et al.)
- List of Hasidic dynasties
