= Lists of Jews associated with the visual arts =

Jewish artists by country:

- Austria
- Britain
- Canada
- France
- Germany
- Hungary
- Israel
- Italy
- Poland
- Russia
- United States

== For others see ==
- Jewish people from Scandinavia and the Baltics
- Jewish people from Eastern Europe
- Jewish people from Western Europe
- Jewish people from Latin America
