= Lists of Jews associated with literature and journalism =

Jewish writers by country:

- Austria
- Britain
- Canada
- France
- Germany
- Hungary
- Israel
- Netherlands
- Poland
- Russia
- United States
  - authors
  - journalists
  - poets
  - playwrights

== See also ==
- List of Yiddish language poets
- List of North European Jews
- List of East European Jews
- List of West European Jews
- List of Latin American Jews
