= List of Jews in the performing arts =

Jewish entertainers by country:

- Austria
- Britain
- Canada
- France
- Germany
- Hungary
- Israel
- Poland
- Russia
- United States

== For others see ==
- Jewish people from Scandinavia and the Baltics
- Jewish people from Eastern Europe
- Jewish people from Western Europe
- Jewish people from Latin America

List of Middle East and India / Jewish people
