= Józef Koffler =

Polish composer, music teacher, musicologist and musical columnist

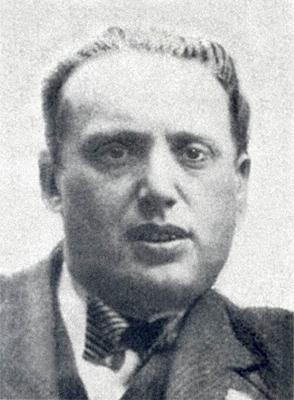
- Józef Koffler around 1931
- Born: 28 November 1896; Stryj, Austria-Hungary
- Died: 1944 (aged 47–48); Krosno, Poland
- Education: Academy of Music and the Performing Arts, Vienna
- Known for: First Polish twelve-tone composer
- Scientific career
- Fields: Music
- Workplaces: Academy of Music and the Performing Arts, Vienna, Austria, Lviv Conservatory, Lwów

Józef Koffler (28 November 1896 – 1944) was a Polish composer, music teacher, musicologist and musical columnist.

He was the first Polish composer living before the Second World War to apply the twelve-tone composition technique (dodecaphony).

== Biography ==
Koffler was born on 28 November 1896 in Stryj, Austria-Hungary. He studied from 1914 to 1916 in Lwów and from 1918 to 1924 he studied music at the Academy of Music and the Performing Arts in Vienna. His teachers were Paul Graener and Felix Weingartner. From 1928 till 1941 Koffler was professionally active as music teacher in Lwów, teaching at the Lwów Conservatory. Polish exile composer Roman Haubenstock-Ramati studied in 1920–1923 composition together with Koffler in Lwów.

Koffler was a composer of 20th-century avant-garde Polish music and the first Polish twelve-tone technique composer.

He must have come into contact with Edward Clark, the British conductor, BBC music producer and former student of Arnold Schoenberg, as his "Variations on a Waltz by Johann Strauss", Op. 23 (1935) were dedicated "À mon ami Edward Clark".

When German troops entered the town Koffler was captured with his wife and son and forcibly relocated to the ghetto in Wieliczka (Poland). His further fate, including the date, location and manner of his death are unknown. At the beginning of 1944 he and his family were probably killed by one of the German Einsatzgruppen near Krosno (in southern Poland) where he was hiding after the liquidation of the ghetto in Wieliczka.

Most of Koffler's unpublished scores vanished in the turmoil of the Second World War, when he was murdered in the Holocaust. Only two works amongst his numerous compositions were published after the war. They were released by the Polish editing house PWM and are available today. They are: String Trio, Op. 10 and Cantata Love, Op. 14. Several of his works have been released on records.

Koffler's 1938 arrangement of J. S. Bach's Goldberg Variations for small orchestra was given its UK premiere on 11 June 2019, at Wigmore Hall, with London's Royal Academy of Music Soloists Ensemble and Toronto's Glenn Gould School, conducted by Trevor Pinnock.

== List of compositions by date and opus number ==
- Slavic song (Chanson Slave) (before 1918)
- Two songs(Zwei Lieder) – for soprano and piano op.1 (1917)
- Ouverture "Hanifa" op.2 (vanished)
- Oriental Suite op.3 (vanished)
- Sielanka („Idyl”) for chamber orchestra op.4 (vanished)
- String quartet op.5 (vanished)
- 40 Polish folk songs op.6 (1925)
- Musique de ballet op.7 (1926)
- Musique. Quasi una sonata op.8, to Karol Szymanowski (1927)
- 15 variations on a 12 tone series (15 variations d'après une suite de douze tons) op.9 (1927)
- String trio op.10 (1928)
- I Symphony op.11 (1930)
- Sonatina op.12 (1930)
- 15 variations on a 12 tone series op.9a, string orchestration of the opus 9 (1931)
- Piano concerto op.13 (1932)
- Cantata Love (Die Liebe) for voice, viola, cello and clarinet op.14 with text of Corinthian 1. Letter Ode to Love and St. Paul (1931)
- Ballet-OratoriumAlles durch M.O.W. (Institute of Daily Correspondence) for dancers, soprano and baritone solo, choir and orchestra op.15 (1932)
- Divertimento (Little serenade) for oboe, clarinet and bassoon op.16 (1931, vanished)
- II Symphony op.17 (1933)
- Capriccio for violin and piano op.18 (1936)
- Piano sonata op.19 (1935, vanished)
- String quartet op. 20 (1934, vanished)
- III Symphony op.21 (1935)
- Quatre poèmes for violin and piano op.22 (1935)
- Variations sur une valse de Johann Strauss op.23 (1935); dedicated to Edward Clark
- Elaboration of Polish Christmas carols for choir (1934–1936)
- Polish suite for chamber orchestra op.24 (1936)
- Little suite according to Klavierbüchlein für Anna Magdalena Bach of J.S. Bach (approximately 1937, vanished)
- Orchestration of the Goldberg variations of J.S. Bach for small orchestra (1938)
- Händeliana, 30 variations on the theme of Passacaglia of Händel (before 1940, vanished)
- Joyful ouverture op.25 (1940, vanished)
- IV Symphony op.26 (1940)
- Four pieces for children (Cztery utwory dziecięce) for piano (before 1940)
- Ukrainian sketches (Szkice ukraińskie) op.27 for string quartet (before 1941)
- Music for scene dramas (vanished)

== Complete list of compositions ==
=== Works fully preserved ===
- Slave song (before 1918)
- Zwei Lieder – Two songs for soprano and piano op.1 (1917)
- 40 Polish folk songs op.6 (1925)
- Musique de ballet op.7 (1926)
- Musique. Quasi una sonata op.8, to Karol Szymanowski (1927)
- 15 variations on a 12 tone series (15 variations d'après une suite de douze tons) op.9 (1927)
- 15 variations on a 12 tone series op.9a, orchestration of the opus 9 for string orchestra (1931)
- String trio op.10 (1928)
- I Symphony op.11 (1930)
- Sonatina op.12 (1930)
- Piano concerto op.13 (1932)
- Love (Die Liebe) cantata for voice, viola, cello and clarinet op.14 (1931)
- Ballet-Oratorium “Alles durch M.O.W. (Institute of Daily Correspondence) for dancers, soprano and baritone solo, choir and orchestra op.15 (1932)
- II Symphony op.17 (1933)
- Capriccio for violin and piano op.18 (1936)
- III Symphony op.21 (1935)
- Quatre poèmes for violin and piano op.22 (1935)
- Variations sur une valse de Johann Strauss op.23 (1935); dedicated to Edward Clark
- Elaboration of Polish Christmas carols for choir (1934–1936)
- Orchestration of the Goldberg variations of J.S. Bach for small orchestra (1938)
- IV Symphony op.26 (1940)
- Four pieces for children (Cztery utwory dziecięce) for piano; before 1940
- Ukrainian sketches (Szkice ukraińskie) op.27 for string quartet (before 1941)

=== Lost works ===
- Ouverture "Hanifa" op.2 (vanished)
- Oriental suite op.3 (vanished)
- Sielanka („Idyl”) for chamber orchestra op.4 (vanished))
- String quartet op.5 (vanished)
- Divertimento (Little serenade) for oboe, clarinet and bassoon op.16 (vanished)
- Piano sonata op.19 (1935)
- String quartet op. 20 (1934)
- Polish suite for chamber orchestra op.24 (1936)
- Little suite according to Klavierbüchlein für Anna Magdalena Bach of J.S. Bach (approximately 1937, vanished)
- Joyful overture op.25 (1940, vanished)
- Händeliana, 30 variations on the theme of Passacaglia of Händel (before 1940, vanished)

== List of compositions by instrument ==
=== Piano music ===
- Slave song (before 1918)
- 40 Polish folk songs op.6 (1925) (the songs can be performed without the solo voice)
- Musique de ballet op.7 (1926)
- Musique. Quasi una sonata op.8, to Karol Szymanowski (1927)
- 15 variations on a 12 tone series (15 variations d'après une suite de douze tons) op.9 (1927)
- Sonatina op.12 (1930)
- Piano sonata op.19 (1935, vanished)
- Variations sur une valse de Johann Strauss op.23 (1935)
- Four pieces for children (Cztery utwory dziecięce) for piano; before 1940)

=== Chamber music ===
- String quartet op.5 (vanished)
- String trio op.10 (1928)
- Divertimento (Little serenade) for oboe, clarinet and bassoon op.16 (1931, vanished)
- Capriccio for violin and piano op.18 (1936)
- String quartet op. 20 (1934, vanished)
- Quatre poèmes for violin and piano op.22 (1935)
- Ukrainian sketches (Szkice ukraińskie) op.27 for string quartet (before 1941)

=== Orchestral music ===
- Uverture "Hanifa" op.2 (vanished)
- Oriental suite op.3 (vanished)
- Sielanka („Idyl”) for chamber orchestra op.4 (vanished)
- 15 variations on a 12 tone series (15 variations d'après une suite de douze tons) op.9 (1927)
- I Symphony op.11 (1930)
- Piano concerto op.13 (1932)
- II Symphony op.17 (1933)
- III Symphony op.21 (1935)
- Polish suite for chamber orchestra op.24 (1936, vanished)
- IV Symphony op.26 (1940)
- Joyful ouverture op.25 (1940, vanished)
- Händeliana, 30 variations on the theme of Passacaglia of Händel, before 1940, vanished)
- Little suite according to Klavierbüchlein für Anna Magdalena Bach of J.S. Bach (approximately 1937, vanished)
- Orchestration of the Goldberg variations of J.S. Bach for small orchestra (1938)
- Music for scene dramas (vanished)

=== Vocal music ===
- Zwei Lieder – Two Songs for soprano and piano op.1 (1917)
- 40 Polish folk songs op.6 (1925) (see also under piano works)
- Love (Die Liebe) cantata for voice, viola, cello and clarinet op.14 (1931)
- Ballet-OratoriumAlles durch M.O.W. (Institute of Daily Correspondence) for dancers, soprano and baritone solo, choir and orchestra op.15 (1932)
- Elaboration of Polish Christmas carols for choir (1934–1936)

== Discography ==
- Józef Koffler, Musique de ballet, Op. 7, Steffen Schleiermacher – piano, MDG MDG6131433, 1996, The Viennese School – Teachers and Followers
- Józef Koffler, Sonatine for piano op.12, Joseph Holt, piano, Darkness & Light, Vol. 2, JDT 3086, 1182819, Music Performed in Concert from The Chamber Music Series at the Holocaust Memorial Museum, 1997
- Józef Koffler, Piano Works I, Sternlicht Elzbieta, piano, Acte Préalable, AP0123, 2005, booklet: prof. Boguslaw Schaeffer (Polish, English French), Total Time: 52'11"
- Józef Koffler, Piano Works II, Sternlicht Elzbieta, piano, Acte Préalable, AP0122, 2005, booklet: prof. Boguslaw Schaeffer (Polish, English French), Total Time: 40'32"

== See also ==
- 20th-century classical music
- History of Jews in Poland
- Music of Poland
- Serialism
- Twelve-tone technique
- List of composers influenced by the Holocaust
- List of Jewish musicians
- List of Polish composers
- List of Polish Jews
- List of victims of Nazism
