= Letterbox (disambiguation) =

A letter box is a receptacle for receiving mail.

Letterbox may also refer to:

- Distribution of advertising mail by letter box drop
- Letterboxing (filming), the practice of transferring film shot in a widescreen aspect ratio to standard-width, resulting in a letterbox
- Letterboxing (hobby), outdoor orienteering game
- Letter Box (game show), a 1962 Australian game show
- "Letterbox", a song by They Might Be Giants from their 1990 album Flood
- Letterbox, a 2017 album by Marie Miller
- Device fingerprint § Offering a simplified fingerprint, also known as letterboxing, a method which mitigates Internet tracking by screen size

== See also ==
- Letterboxd, a social networking site for films
- Letter Boxed, an online word puzzle video game
- Party Time (TV series), an Australian game show
