= Mahler (surname) =

Mahler is a German occupational surname. Mahler was a variant spelling of Maler ("painter"), particularly a painter of stained glass.

The name most often refers to Gustav Mahler, Bohemian-Austrian composer and conductor. His family included:

- Alma Mahler-Schindler (1879–1964): Austrian socialite and wife of, successively, Gustav Mahler, Walter Gropius and Franz Werfel
- Anna Mahler (1904–1988): Austrian-British sculptor, daughter of Gustav and Alma
- Arthur Mahler (1871–1944): Austrian archæologist, cousin of Gustav
- Fritz Mahler (1901–1973): Austrian conductor, and cousin once removed of Gustav
- Joseph Mahler (1900–1981), inventor of the Vectograph stereoscopic technique, cousin of Gustav
- Otto Mahler (1873–1895), Bohemian-Austrian musician and youngest brother of Gustav
- Zdeněk Mahler (1936–2018): Czech pedagogue, writer, publicist, and musicologist; distantly related to Gustav

Other people named Mahler include:

- Ángel Mahler (1960–2025), Argentine composer and conductor
- Bruce Mahler (born 1950), American actor
- Eduard Mahler (1857–1945): Hungarian-Austrian orientalist, astronomer, natural scientist
- Fanny Mahler (1854–1942), Austrian pianist and music teacher
- Gregory Mahler (born 1950), American political scientist
- Henry Mahler (1921–1983), Austrian-American biochemist
- Halfdan T. Mahler (1923–2016): Danish physician, general director of the WHO
- Hedwig Courths-Mahler (1867–1950), German prolific novelist
- Horst Mahler (1936–2025), German lawyer and political extremist (cofounded RAF)
- Kurt Mahler (1903–1988), British-German mathematician
- Margaret Mahler-Schnœnberger (1897–1985): American-Hungarian psychoanalyst, infant psychologist
- Marian Mahler (1908–1982): British designer, commercial artist, and book illustrator
- Mickey Mahler (born 1952), American baseball player
- Nicolas Mahler (born 1969), Austrian artist
- Raphael Mahler (1899–1977): Jewish historian from Poland, then America, and Israel
- Rick Mahler (1953–2005), American baseball player
- Thomas Mahler, Austrian game developer and founder of Moon Studios
- Vincent A. Mahler (born 1949), American political scientist

== See also ==
- Mahler (disambiguation)
- Maler
