= Mahler (disambiguation) =

Gustav Mahler (1860–1911) was a conductor and late-romantic composer.

Mahler may also refer to:

- Mahler (surname), a German surname (including a list of people with the surname)
- Mahler B. Ryder (1937–1992), American mixed-media artist, educator of design
- Mahler (film), a 1974 film about composers Gustav and Alma Mahler
- Mahler (horse), an Irish racehorse
- Mahler (crater), a crater on the planet Mercury
- Mount Mahler, a mountain in Colorado USA

== See also ==
- Maher (disambiguation)
- Kurt Mahler:
  - Mahler measure
  - Mahler's compactness theorem
  - Mahler's theorem
- Maler, German surname
