= Lists of Jews in politics =

This is a list of politicians of Jewish origin divided between their respective countries and those serving as heads of state and government.

== Jewish politicians by country ==
- Australia
- Austria
- Canada
- France
- Germany
- Israel (Includes non-Jewish politicians)
- New Zealand
- Poland
- Russia
- South-east European
- United Kingdom
- United States

== Jewish heads of state and government ==
- List of Jewish heads of state and government
