= Mälzer =

Mälzer is a German surname. Notable people with the surname include:

- Kurt Mälzer (1894–1952), German Luftwaffe general
- Tim Mälzer (born 1971), German chef, restaurateur, author, and television personality

== See also ==
- Maler
