= Esmeralda Athanasiu-Gardeev =

Romanian pianist and composer

Esmeralda Athanasiu-Gardeev (also Esméralda Athanassiou-Gardéev, 1834–1917) was a Romanian pianist and composer. She studied piano and composition in Paris with Julius Schulhoff and composition in St. Petersburg with Anton Rubinstein. She married a Russian general, who introduced her to European aristocracy. Athanasiu-Gardeev taught singing, lute and piano, and her compositions are influenced by Romanian folklore. She published a large number of salon compositions, often with French titles, and dedicated to members of the aristocracy.

== Life ==
Athanasiu-Gardeev was born in Galaţi, Moldavia, in 1834. She studied music in Bucharest and then piano and composition in Paris with Julius Schulhoff and composition in St. Petersburg with Anton Rubinstein. She was married to Vasile Hermaziu for a short time, and then to a Russian, General Gardeev, who introduced her to European and Russian aristocracy. Through Gardeev, Athanasiu-Gardeev attended the salons of George Sand, Vasile Alecsandri, Sophie Menter, Camillo Sivori, and others. Musicologist Derek B. Scott argues that understanding salon music is important for understanding music at this period in Romania. Salon music was often published, making it 'public', but the performances were in private houses and depended upon social networks and social class. Scott describes some of Athanasiu-Gardeev's piano compositions as technically extremely difficult, and also says "her Rumänisches Charakterstück contains examples of rich romantic harmony, such as half-diminished sevenths and dominant ninths, and there is a Lisztian cadenza...[but] despite her composition lessons, there are plenty of examples of amateurish technique."

After the Romanian War of Independence, Athanasiu-Gardeev lived in Bucharest, teaching voice, lute and piano. She died in Bucharest in 1917.

== Works ==
Many of Athanasiu-Gardeev's compositions were based on Romanian folklore. She published a large number of salon compositions, often with French titles, and dedicated to members of the aristrocracy. Selected works include:

- Romanian March, Op. 1
- Myosotis (mazurka)
- Sourvenir de Odessa (mazurka)
- Polca capricioasa
- Wordless romance
- Scherzo
- Imn hymn for mixed chorus
- Collection de chansons
- 3 Leider
