= Greta Hort =

Danish and English professor (1903 - 1967)

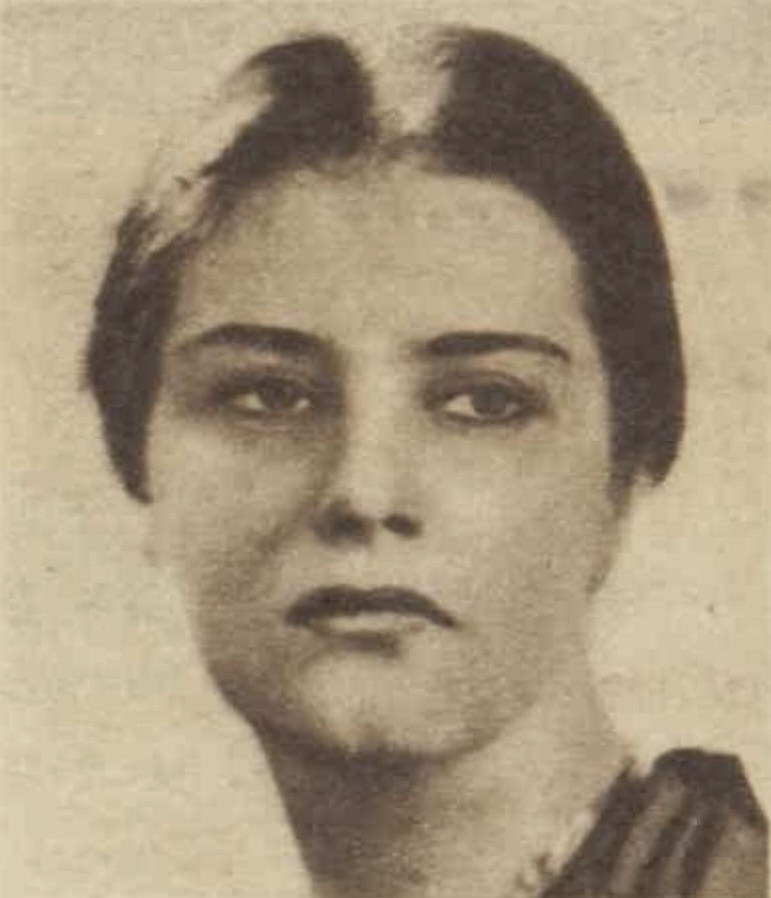
Grethe Hjort (c. 1938)

Grethe Hjort (1903–1967) was a Danish-born professor of Danish and English literature. After graduating from the University of Copenhagen, she moved to Cambridge where she studied at Newnham College, earning a Ph.D. in 1931 and subsequently becoming a Pfeiffer research fellow at Girton College. While there, she obtained British citizenship and changed her name to Greta Hort. In 1938 she moved to Australia where she was appointed principal of University Women's College at the University of Melbourne. After resigning in 1946, she moved to Prague where she undertook biblical research until 1956. She then returned to Denmark, becoming Professor of English Literature at Aarhus University from 1958 until her death in 1967. She pioneered a programme of studies including Australian and Commonwealth literature and for the first time taught English-literature courses in the English language.

== Early life and education ==
Born on 25 May 1903 in Copenhagen, Grethe Hjort was the daughter of the meteorologist Vilhelm Hjort (1861–1920) and his wife Anne Margrethe née Ulrich (1878–1942). On graduating from N. Zahle's School in 1922, she studied English at the University of Copenhagen where she received the university's gold medal in 1925 and earned a master's degree in 1927. After teaching English literature for a short period at the university, in 1929 she moved to Cambridge where she studied at Newnham College, earning a Ph.D. in 1931. She then became a Pfeiffer research fellow at Girton College, publishing two significant works on the literature of the Middle Ages: Sense and Thought, A Study in Mysticism (1936) and Piers Ploughman and Contemporary Religious Thought (1938). While in England, she acquired British citizenship and changed her name to Greta Hort to facilitate its pronunciation in English. Hort won an Aurelia Henry Reinhardt International Fellowship and planned to go to Harvard University, but passed it up and moved instead to Australia.

== Career ==
=== Melbourne, Australia ===
In 1938, Hort was appointed principal of the newly established University Women's College at the University of Melbourne. At a welcoming reception she stated: "I come of a race that has spread all over the world and has made its home in diverse countries. I hope that I have the home-building qualities of my forefathers and that I have learnt from them that one is never lost in a friendly country." Diana Dyason who was a resident at the college remembers her dreary dress and thick grey stockings, almost a caricature of her Cambridge years. But Hort tutored competently in philosophy, demanded high academic standards and encouraged her students to develop a greater sense of freedom and self-government than was usual at the time. During her tenure, the number of students at the Women's College rose from 25 to 100 although she experienced difficulty in receiving the funding necessary for expansion, given the stigma of women's education in Australia.

While in Melbourne, Hort was vice president of the Australia-China Society, a patron of the Australia-Indian Society, president of the local branch of the Australasian Society of Psychology and Philosophy and an executive of the Pro-Palestine Association of Victoria. From 1943 to 1946, she was a member of the Melbourne University Council. While in Australia, Hort published Two Poems (1945) and a translation of Martin Buber's essays titled Mamre (1916).

=== Prague, Czechoslovakia ===
In October 1946, Hort resigned as college principal and accompanied her partner, the geographer Julie Moschelesová, to her native Czechoslovakia. She had met Moschelesová in Melbourne at the Czechoslovak branch of the Red Cross where she was president. From 1947, she spent five years in Prague where she undertook research on the Old Testament and the history of religion. In particular, she published articles on "The Plagues of Egypt" (1957) and "The Death of Qorah" (1959).

=== Aarhus, Denmark ===
In 1957, after the death of Moschelesová, Hort returned to Denmark where she was appointed professor of English literature at Aarhus University in 1958. She brought with her wide experience of English literature, especially that of Australia and the Commonwealth countries, and greatly expanded the university library along these lines. Her approach to teaching was based on effectiveness rather than traditional academic values. She taught her students in the English language rather than in Danish like her predecessors. Hort introduced an Australian Studies programme, the first of its kind anywhere in the world even in Australia.

== Honours and awards ==
In addition to the gold medal she received from the University of Copenhagen in 1925, in 1965 Hort was awarded the Tagea Brandt Travel Scholarship for her contributions to literature. The same year she was honoured as a Knight of the Order of the Dannebrog.

== Death and legacy ==
Greta Hort died in her home in the Risskov district of Aarhus on 19 August 1967. In 1990, a library at Melbourne University's University College was named after her. In the early 1990s, a "Greta Hort Scholarship" was established for Ph.D. student exchanges between the University of Melbourne and Aarhus University. It is now supported by the Dannebrog Foundation.
