= Myra Roper =

British-born Australian educationalist, author, broadcaster and expert on China

Myra Roper AM
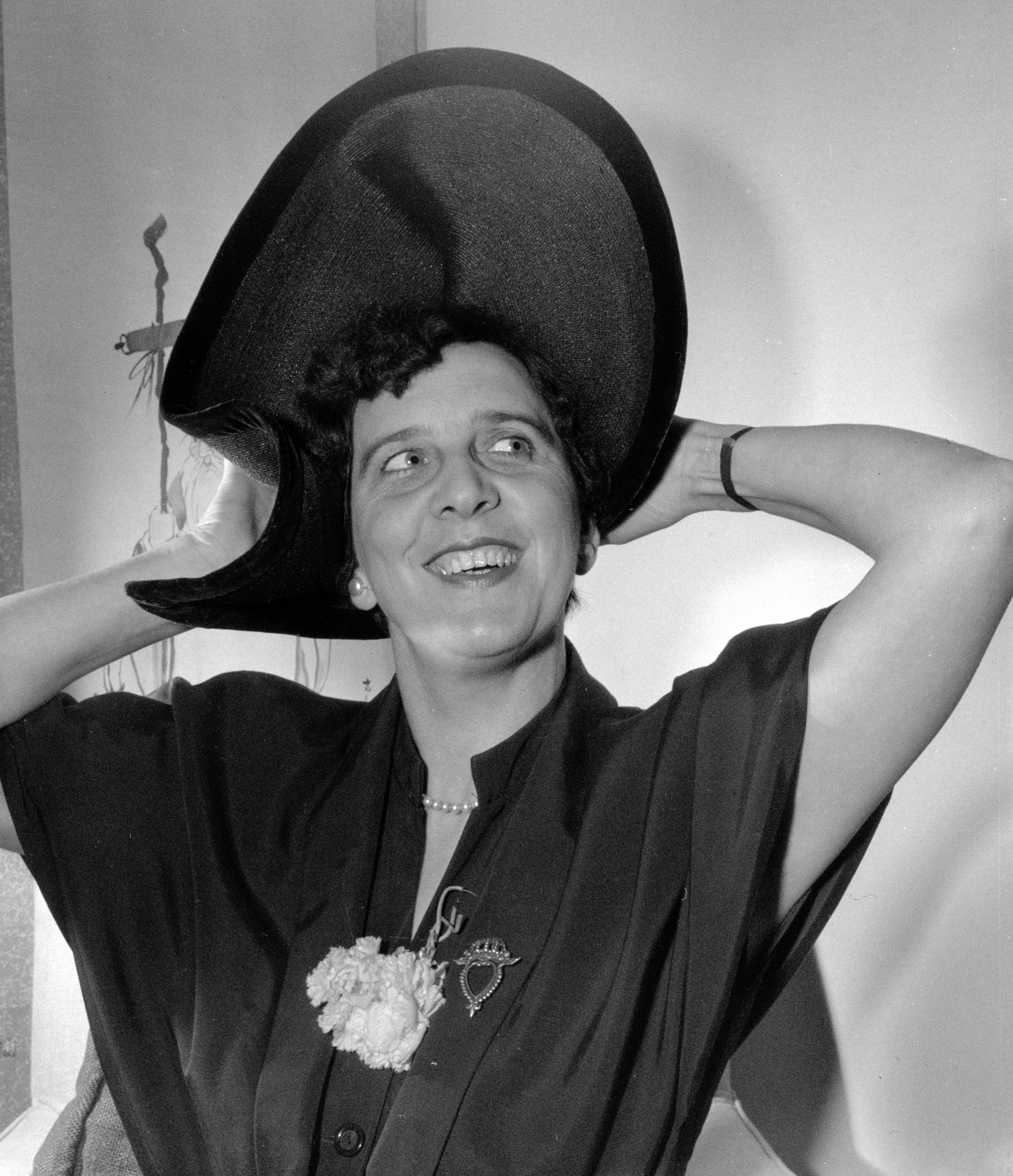
- Myra Ellen Roper by Gordon F. De Lisle, 1952
- Born: 1911; Haworth, Yorkshire
- Died: 2002 (aged 90–91)
- Organization: University Women's College
- Title: Principal
- Term: 1947 to 1960

Myra Ellen Roper AM (1911–2002) was a British-born Australian educationalist, author, broadcaster, and expert on China. She was principal of University Women's College, at the University of Melbourne from 1947 to 1960.

Roper wrote five books about China to encourage sympathy and acceptance of the new People's Republic of China, including a book for children.

Her papers are collected in the National Library of Australia.

== Early life and education ==
Born in Haworth, Yorkshire in 1911, Roper was educated at Newnham College, Cambridge, graduating in 1933, and a Diploma in Teaching from the Institute of Education, London University in 1934. She taught in England and Canada, and was an Assistant Education officer in England.

== Career in Australia ==
Roper came to Australia in 1947 to become the third Principal of University Women's College, at the University of Melbourne, a role she held until 1960. She gained her MA from the University of Melbourne in 1947. She was an active fundraiser and built three new accommodation wings for female students who came from the country and from Asia, tripling the college's size. The third building, completed after she left the college was named for her. The building was replaced by the College in 2017, retaining her name. A scholarship for a graduate student from China to University College also bears her name. A biography of this time was published in 1989.

Roper was an active broadcaster, appearing regularly on television, for example on the ABC program Meet (1957), and on Channel 7 as co-host with Bill Acfield of Letter Box (1962) and Party Time (1963).

She sat on the ABC Advisory Committee, the Elizabethan Theatre Trust and the Melbourne State College boards. She also published articles and gave speeches on education and encouraging women's representation in public life.

== Australia–Asia relations ==
Roper was particularly influential in her work travelling to Asia and building Australia–China relations between the 1950s and 1980s. She visited China 15 times, and wrote four books about her travels. She was also 'the first Australian to make a television documentary of China during the Maoist era". She became the President of the Committee for Australia China Relations. After retiring from University College, she focused on her broadcasting and the delegations to China. In 1965 she moved to Canberra, the national capital, to continue her work.

Images of her travels to Thailand, Indonesia and Papua New Guinea, among others, are held in the Monash University Library.

== Awards ==
She was named a Member of the Order of Australia in 1985, for "services to international relations."

First annual award of the Rostrum Club of Victoria, the Award of Merit, for excellence in the art of public speaking over a considerable period and his demonstration of an effective contribution to society through the spoken word. Awarded on 23 July 1977.

== Publications ==
- 'An Idea is a Fact' in Australian theatre year book (F.W. Chesire, 1958), pp. 11–17
- China: The Surprising Country (Heinemann, 1966)
- China in Revolution 1911–1949 (Edward Arnold, 1971)
- China: A world so changed with Charles Patrick Fitzgerald, (Heinemann, 1973)
- Modern Chinese history, 1793-1949 : from first European contacts to the Communist Revolution (Heinemann, 1982).
- Emperor's China, People's China (Heinemann, 1981)
