= University College, Melbourne =

College of the University of Melbourne, Victoria, Australia

University College
- University of Melbourne
- Location: 40 College Crescent, Parkville, Victoria, Melbourne
- Coordinates: 37°47′30″S 144°57′34″E
- Motto: French: Frappe Fort
- Motto in English: What you do, do with a will.
- Established: 1937
- Colours: Blue and Maroon
- Head of College: Dr Jennifer McDonald
- Undergraduates: 340
- Postgraduates: 5
- Mascot: Boar
- Website: unicol.unimelb.edu.au

University College (UC) is a residential college affiliated with the University of Melbourne in Australia. It was formerly known as University Women's College and was established in 1937 as another residential college for female residents. (Janet Clarke Hall had been established in 1886). In 1975 the college became co-residential. The college is in the suburb of Parkville.

University College houses 340 undergraduate and graduate students each year from the University of Melbourne, RMIT University, Monash University Faculty of Pharmacy and Pharmaceutical Sciences, the Victorian College of the Arts, Australian Catholic University and other universities near its campus.

University College was renovated between 2007 and 2008 to include a new recreation complex with indoor sporting and other facilities including a design studio, TV room, gym, band room and a spacious multi-purpose area with billiard and table tennis tables. The college underwent another redevelopment in 2019, the major feature being 190 modern, en-suite student rooms with double beds. The first part of the project to be completed was the Syme Dining Hall, which opened in 2017 and features an innovative and energy efficient design reflective of the German 'Passivhaus' concept.

The college provides all-inclusive meals, tutorial and wellbeing programs and networking opportunities. Additionally, University College offers a variety of events and activities for all personality types, including various sports, musical events, social events and leadership activities.

The college's colours (as worn on the sporting field) are maroon, pale blue and black. The mascot is the boar. Its motto is Frappe Fort which translates to 'what you do, do with a will'.

The unofficial slogan embodied by University College students is love, passion and die-hard spirit.

Conference facilities are available throughout the year, especially over the summer and winter university breaks.

While prospective students and families are able to tour University College throughout its open periods during the year, there are virtual tour options available on the website which is recommended for interstate and overseas families.

The college endeavors to create a networked and united student cohort and achieves this post-university study through hosting regular Alumni events.

== Heads of College ==
- Andrew Swan (2026-Present)
- Jennifer McDonald (2008–2026)
- Deborah Seifert (2002–2008)
- Susanne Pearce (1999–2002)
- Heather Hewitt (1979–1999)
- Margaret Russell-Smith (1967–1979)
- Angela Milne (1960–1967)
- Myra Roper (1947–1960)
- Greta Hort (1938–1947)
- Susie Williams (1937–1938)
