= List of Jewish musicians =

Jewish musicians by country:

- Argentina
- Austria
  - Composers
- Britain
- Canada
- France
- Germany
- Hungary
- Israel
  - Composers
- Mexico
- Poland
- Russia
- South Africa
- United States
  - Composers
  - Category:Jewish American musicians

== See also ==
- Jewish music
- Category:Jewish musicians by nationality
