= List of Czech and Slovak Jews =

There was a large and thriving community of Jews, both religious and secular, in Czechoslovakia before World War II. Many perished during the Holocaust. Today, nearly all of the survivors have inter-married and assimilated into Czech and Slovak society.

== Academics and scientists ==
=== Engineering ===
- Itzhak Bentov, inventor
- Daniel Mandl (1891–1944), civil engineer, inventor, victim of the Holocaust

=== Social science ===
- Guido Adler (1855–1941), musicologist, composer, writer, born in Ivančice (Eibenschütz), Moravia
- Yehuda Bauer, Czech-born Israeli historian of the Holocaust
- Samuel Bergman, philosopher
- Pavel Bergmann, historian, philosopher and political activist; signatory of charter 77;
- Berthold Bretholz, Moravian historian
- Vilém Flusser (1920–1991), self-taught philosopher
- Ernest Gellner (1925–1995), philosopher and social anthropologist
- Joseph Goldberger, discovered cure for pellagra
- Anna Hájková, (1978-) Holocaust historian and Theresienstadt expert
- Stephan Korner, philosopher
- Julie Moschelesová (1892–1956) A pioneering geographer in Czechoslovakia who emigrated to Australia
- Ernest Nagel, philosopher
- Samuel Steinherz (1857–1942), Czechoslovak mediaevalist

=== Mathematics ===
- Nikolai Brashman (1796–1866), mathematician
- David Gans (1541–1613), mathematician
- Joseph Kohn (1932–2023), mathematician
- Ernst Kolman (1892–1972), philosopher of mathematics
- Charles Loewner (1893–1968), mathematician
- Assaf Naor (born 1975), mathematician
- Alfred Tauber (1866–1942), mathematician
- Olga Taussky-Todd (1906–1995), mathematician

=== Medicine ===
- Sigmund Freud (1856–1939), neurologist, founder of psychoanalysis; born in Příbor (Freiberg), Moravia
- Carl Koller (1857–1944), ophthalmologist
- Pavol Steiner (1908–1969), Olympic water polo player, swimmer, and cardiac surgeon
- Rudolf Vrba (1924–2006), pharmacologist (born in Slovakia)

=== Natural science ===
- Gerty Cori (1896–1957), biochemist
- Martin Fleischmann, chemist
- Eva Smolková‑Keulemansová, (1927-2024) professor of analytical science at Charles University.
- Rudolf Vrba, coauthor of the Vrba–Wetzler report, chemist

== Arts/entertainment ==
- Bedřich Feuerstein (1892–1936), architect, painter and essayist
- Miloš Forman (1932–2018), film director, actor and script writer
- Arnošt Goldflam (born 1946), playwright, writer, director, screenwriter and actor
- Hugo Haas (1901–1968), actor and film director
- Juraj Herz (born 1934), film director, actor, and scenic designer (born in Slovakia)
- Miloš Kopecký (1922–1996), actor
- Hugo Lederer (1871–1940), sculptor
- Francis Lederer (1899–2000), actor
- Herbert Lom (1917–2012), actor
- Peter Lorre, actor
- Robert Maxwell (1923–1991), media mogul
- Emil Orlik (1870–1932), painter
- Alfréd Radok (1917–1976), writer and director in theater and film
- Karel Reisz (1926–2002), film director
- Ivan Reitman (1946-2022), film director (born in Slovakia)
- Emery Roth (1871–1948), architect (born in Sečovce at the present-day territory of Slovakia)
- Jan Saudek (born 1935), art photographer
- Anna Ticho (1894–1980), artist
- Jiří Weiss (1913–2004), film director and screenwriter
- Adrianna Demiany (née Roskovanyi) (born 1942), Slovak-Hungarian-Canadian Journalist (Born in Košice at the present-day territory of Slovakia)

== Athletes ==
- Kurt Epstein (1904–1975), Czechoslovak national water polo team, Olympic competitor, incarcerated by the Nazis in Theresienstadt and Auschwitz
- Arie Gill-Glick (1930–2016), Israeli Olympic runner
- Ladislav Hecht (1909–2004), Czechoslovak-American tennis player, world #6
- Gertrude "Traute" Kleinová (1918–1976), table tennis, three-time world champion, incarcerated by the Nazis in Theresienstadt and Auschwitz
- Pavol Steiner (1908–1969), Olympic water polo player, swimmer, and cardiac surgeon
- Olga Winterberg (1922–2010), Israeli Olympian in the discus throw

== Music ==
- Karel Ančerl (1908–1973), conductor, respected for his performances of contemporary music and particularly cherished for his interpretations of music by Czech composers
- Karel Berman (1919–1995), opera singer and composer
- Ignaz Brüll, composer and pianist
- Arthur Chitz (1882–1944) musicologist, composer, pianist, and conductor
- Alexander Goldscheider (born 1950), composer and producer
- Alfred Grünfeld (1852–1924), pianist and composer
- Pavel Haas (1899–1944), composer
- Eduard Hanslick (1825–1904), music critic
- Gideon Klein (1919–1945), composer of classical music
- Eliška Kleinová (1912–1999), pianist, music educator; sister of Gideon Klein
- Erich Wolfgang Korngold (1897–1957), composer
- Hans Krása (1899–1944), composer
- Egon Ledeč (1889–1944), music composer
- Gustav Mahler (1860–1911), music composer and conductor, Czech-born
- Herbert Thomas Mandl (1926–2007), concert violinist, professor at the Janáček Academy of Music in Ostrava, Holocaust survivor who was a contemporary witness to the rich cultural life in the Theresienstadt (Terezín) ghetto
- Ignaz Moscheles (1794–1870), composer and piano virtuoso
- Zuzana Růžičková (1927–2017), contemporary harpsichordist, interpreter of classical and baroque music
- Erwin Schulhoff (1894–1942), composer and pianist
- Julius Schulhoff (1825–1898), pianist and composer
- Walter Susskind (1913–1980), conductor
- Viktor Ullmann (1898–1944), composer, conductor and pianist
- Jaromír Weinberger (1896–1967), composer

== Politicians ==
- Victor Adler (1852–1918), socialist politician, born in Prague
- Madeleine Albright (1937–2022), served as the 64th United States Secretary of State
- Ludwig Czech (1870–1942), leader and several times minister for the German Social Democratic Workers Party in the Czechoslovak Republic
- Jan Fischer (born 1951), prime minister of the Czech Republic (2009)
- Bruno Kafka (1881–1931), German-speaking Jewish Czech politician, leader from 1918 to his death of the Czechoslovak German Democratic Liberal Party, member of the National Assembly
- Ignaz Kuranda, politician
- Artur London (1915–1986), communist politician and co-defendant in the Slánský trial; born in Ostrava, Silesia, Austria-Hungary
- Rudolf Margolius (1913–1952), Deputy Minister of Foreign Trade (1949–1952), a victim of the Slánský trial
- Rudolf Slánský (1901–1952); Communist politician and the party's General Secretary after World War II; fell into disfavour with the regime and was executed after a show trial
- Michael Žantovský, politician and author; appointed to serve as the Ambassador to Israel in July 2003
- Vladimír Železný (born 1945), media businessman and politician, member of the European Parliament, founder of TV NOVA

== Religious leaders ==
- Samuel Abramson, rabbi of Carlsbad
- Tzvi Ashkenazi, better known as Haham Zevi, chief rabbi of Amsterdam, prominent opponent of the Sabbateans
- Nehemiah Brüll, rabbi (born Rousínov, Moravia)
- Israel Bruna, rabbi (born Brno)
- Aaron Chorin, rabbi (born Moravia)
- Joseph H. Hertz (1872–1946), Chief Rabbi of the British Empire
- Isaac ben Jacob ha-Lavan, Bohemian tosafist
- Judah Loew ben Bezalel (1525?–1609), rabbi
- Mordecai Meisel, philanthropist and communal leader at Prague
- Karol Sidon, playwright, chief rabbi of Prague, and Convert to Judaism
- Salomon Weisz, cantor & Bar Mitzvah teacher in Znojmo and Trebic, cantor of Moravia and Bar Mitzvah teacher in Prague from 1946 to 1968.

== Writers ==
- Henri Blowitz, journalist
- Max Brod (1884–1968), author, composer, and journalist
- Petr Brod (b. 1951), journalist
- Avigdor Dagan (1912–2006), writer
- Egon Hostovsky (1908–1973), writer
- Franz Kafka (1883–1924), novelist
- Siegfried Kapper (1821–1879), writer
- Ivan Klíma (1931–2025), novelist, playwright
- Leopold Kompert (1822–1886), author
- Heda Margolius Kovály, author and translator
- František R. Kraus (1903–1967), writer, journalist and reporter; wrote one of the first books ever about his experience in Auschwitz, published in 1945
- Jiří Langer (1894-1943), poet, scholar and essayist, journalist and teacher
- Arnošt Lustig (1926–2011), author of novels, short stories, plays and screenplays whose works have often involved the Holocaust
- Jiří Orten (1919–1941), poet
- Ota Pavel (1930–1973), writer, journalist and sport reporter
- Leopold Perutz (1882–1957), German language novelist and mathematician
- Karel Poláček (1892–1945), writer and journalist
- Tom Stoppard (born 1937), playwright, known for plays such as The Real Thing and Rosencrantz & Guildenstern Are Dead, and for the screenplay for Shakespeare in Love
- Hermann Ungar (1893–1929), writer of German language and an officer in the Ministry of Foreign Affairs of Czechoslovakia
- Jiří Weil (1900–1959), writer, novels Life with a Star (Život s hvězdou) and Mendelssohn is on the Roof
- Franz Werfel (1890–1945), Czech-born writer; married Mahler's widow
- Alfred Wetzler, writer

== Other ==
- Jacob Bassevi (1580–1634), Bohemian Court Jew and financier
- George Brady (1928–2019), brother of Hana Brady
- Hana Brady (1931–1944), Holocaust victim
- Izrael Zachariah Deutsch, deaf memoirist
- Salo Flohr (1908–1983), leading chess master of the early 20th century
- Petr Ginz (1928–1944), boy deported to the Terezín concentration camp during the Holocaust
- Isaak Löw Hofmann, Edler von Hofmannsthal (1759–1849), merchant
- Ignác Kolisch, chess player
- Frank Lowy (born 1930), businessman
- Richard Réti (1889–1929), chess grandmaster
- Yoshua Samuel Rusnak (also "Yehoshua Sh'mu'el Rusnak"; died 1915), diasporan Jew and Zionist based in Kosice, Slovakia; many of his family members were murdered in the Holocaust at Auschwitz
- Wilhelm Steinitz (1836–1900), first World Chess Champion
- Irene Capek (1925–2006), Jewish holocaust survivor, humanitarian and local Australian politician

== See also ==
- History of the Jews in the Czech Republic
- History of the Jews in Slovakia
- List of Austrian Jews
- List of Czechs
- List of East European Jews
- List of Slovaks
