= List of Austrian Jews =

Austria first became a center of Jewish learning during the 13th century. However, increasing antisemitism led to the expulsion of the Jews in 1669. Following formal readmission in 1848, a sizable Jewish community developed once again, contributing strongly to Austrian culture. By the 1930s, 300,000 Jews lived in Austria, most of them in Vienna. Following the Anschluss with Nazi Germany, most of the community emigrated or were killed in the Holocaust. The current Austrian Jewish population is 9,000. The following is a list of some prominent Austrian Jews. Here German-speaking Jews from the whole Habsburg monarchy are listed.

== Athletes ==
- Margarete "Grete" Adler (1896–1990), swimmer, Olympic bronze (4x100-m freestyle relay)
- Richard Bergmann (1919–1970), Austria/Britain table tennis player, seven-time world champion, ITTF Hall of Fame
- Hedy Bienenfeld (1907–1976), Austrian-American Olympic swimmer
- Albert Bogen (Albert Bógathy) (1882–1961), fencer (saber), Olympic silver
- Fritzi Burger (1910–1999), figure skater, two-time Olympic silver, two-time World Championship silver
- Robert Fein (1907–1975), Olympic Champion weightlifter
- Siegfried "Fritz" Flesch (1872–1939), fencer (sabre), Olympic bronze
- Alfred Guth (1908–1996), Austrian-born American water polo player, swimmer, and Olympic modern pentathlete
- Hans Haas (1906–1973), weightlifter, Olympic champion (lightweight), silver
- Judith Haspel (born "Judith Deutsch") (1918–2004), Austrian-born Israeli swimmer, held every Austrian women's middle and long-distance freestyle record in 1935, refused to represent Austria in 1936 Summer Olympics along with Ruth Langer and Lucie Goldner, protesting Hitler, stating, "I refuse to enter a contest in a land which so shamefully persecutes my people."
- Dr. Otto Herschmann (1877–1942), fencer (saber), 2-time Olympic silver winner (in fencing/team sabre and 100-m freestyle); arrested by Nazis, and died in Izbica concentration camp
- Nickolaus "Mickey" Hirschl (1906–1991), wrestler, two-time Olympic bronze (heavyweight freestyle and Greco-Roman), shot put and discus junior champion, weightlifting junior champion, and pentathlon champion
- Felix Kasper (1915–2003), figure skater, Olympic bronze
- Alfred König (1913–1987), Austrian-Turkish Olympic sprinter
- Ruth Langer (1921–1999), Austrian national champion swimmer who refused to attend the 1936 Summer Olympics, along with Judith Haspel and Lucie Goldner
- Fritzi Löwy (1910–1994), Austrian Olympic swimmer
- Klara Milch (1891–1970), swimmer, Olympic bronze (4x100-m freestyle relay)
- Paul Neumann (1875–1932), swimmer, Olympic champion (500-m freestyle)
- Fred Oberlander (1911–1996), Austrian, British, and Canadian wrestler; world champion (freestyle heavyweight); Maccabiah champion
- Felix Pipes (1887–1983), tennis player, Olympic silver (doubles)
- Maxim Podoprigora (born 1978), Olympic swimmer
- Ellen Preis (1912–2007), fencer (foil), three-time world champion (1947, 1949, and 1950), Olympic champion, 17-time Austrian champion
- Otto Scheff (born "Otto Sochaczewsky") (1889–1956), swimmer, Olympic champion (400-m freestyle) and two-time bronze (400-m freestyle, 1,500-m freestyle)
- Josephine Sticker (1894–1963), swimmer, Olympic bronze (4x100-m freestyle relay)
- Otto Wahle (1879–1963), Austrian/US swimmer, two-time Olympic silver (1,000-m freestyle, 200-m obstacle race) and bronze (400-m freestyle); International Swimming Hall of Fame

== Historical figures ==
=== Politicians ===
- Bruno Kreisky (1911–1990), Chancellor of Austria 1970–1983, agnostic
- Ignaz Kuranda (1812–1884), politician
- Joseph Redlich (1857–1943), politician, Minister of Finance in the early 1930s
- Otto Bauer (1881–1938), Foreign Minister 1918–1919
- Franz Klein (1854–1926), Minister of Justice 1906–1908, and in 1916

=== Revolutionaries ===
- Simon Deutsch (1822–1877), revolutionary

== Academic figures ==
=== Lawyers ===
- Fred F. Herzog (1907–2008), only Jewish judge in Austria between the World Wars; fled to the United States and became the dean of two law schools

=== Scientists ===
- Carl Djerassi (1923–2015), chemist, inventor of the pill
- Sir Otto Frankel (1900–1998), geneticist
- Jakob Erdheim (1874–1937), pathologist (Erdheim–Chester disease).
- Eric Kandel (born 1929), neuroscientist, winner of 2000 Nobel Prize in Physiology or Medicine
- Karl Koller (1857–1944), ophthalmologist; first to use cocaine as an anaesthetic
- Hans Kronberger (1920–1970), nuclear physicist
- Robert von Lieben (1878–1913), physicist (Jewish father)
- Victor Frederick Weisskopf (1908–2002), physicist; during World War II, worked at Los Alamos on the Manhattan Project to develop the atomic bomb; later campaigned against the proliferation of nuclear weapons
- Max Perutz (1914–2002), molecular biologist, winner of 1962 Nobel Prize for Chemistry
- Lise Meitner (1878–1968), physicist, discovered nuclear fission of uranium with * Otto Hahn, namegiver of element 109 * meitnerium

=== Psychologists, psychotherapists and psychiatrists ===
- Alfred Adler (1870–1937), founding member of the Vienna Psychoanalytic Society and founder of the school of individual psychology
- Anna Freud (1895–1982), Vienna-born child psychologist and daughter of Sigmund Freud
- Sigmund Freud (1856–1939), Moravian-born founder of psychoanalysis and neurologist
- Marie Jahoda (1907–2001), psychologist
- Helen Singer Kaplan (1929–1995), sex therapist
- Melanie Klein (1882–1960), psychotherapy
- Heinz Kohut (1913–1981), psychiatrist and psychoanalyst
- Wilhelm Reich (1897–1957), psychiatry and psychoanalysis
- Viktor Frankl (1905–1997), psychiatrist and psychologist

=== Social and political scientists ===
- Guido Adler (1855–1941), Moravian musicologist
- Hugo Bergmann (1883–1975), philosopher
- Hugo Botstiber (1875–1941), musicologist
- Paul Edwards (1923–2004), philosopher
- Heinrich Friedjung (1851–1920), Moravian historian and politician
- Norbert Jokl (1877–1942), founder of Albanology
- Otto Kurz (1908–1975), historian
- Emil Lederer (1882–1939), economist
- Ludwig von Mises (1881–1973), economist
- Otto Neurath (1882–1945), economist, sociologist, philosopher
- Ludwig Wittgenstein (1889–1951), philosopher (of largely Jewish descent but given a Catholic burial)

== Cultural figures ==
=== Film and stage ===
- Gabrielle Anwar, actress
- John Banner, actor, well known for the character of sgt. Schultz
- Rudolf Bing (1902–1997), opera impresario, General Manager of the Metropolitan Opera in New York from 1950 to 1972
- Fritz Grünbaum (1880–1941), cabaret artist, operetta and pop songwriter, director, actor and master of ceremonies
- Alber Misak, actor
- Kurt Kren (1929–1998), experimental filmmaker, director of the avant garde films 8/64: Ana – Aktion Brus, 10/65: Selbstverstümmelung, 10b/65: Silber – Aktion Brus, 16/67: 20. September, and 10c/65: Brus wünscht euch seine Weihnachten (Jewish father)
- Reggie Nalder (1907–1991), cabaret dancer, stage, film and television actor
- Joseph Schildkraut (1896–1964), stage and film actor
- Frederick Schrecker (1892–1976), actor of film, stage and TV
- Harry Schein (1924–2006), founder of the Swedish Film Institute, writer, chemical engineer
- Elisabeth Freundlich (1906–2001), playwright and journalist who reported on the Frankfurt Auschwitz Trials - Holocaust survivor

=== Musicians ===
- Kurt Adler (1907–1977), Bohemian born Austrian chorus master, conductor, pianist, author, Metropolitan Opera New York City, United States
- Fanny Basch-Mahler (1854–1942), pianist and music teacher
- Ignaz Brüll (1846–1907), composer and pianist
- Hanns Eisler (1898–1962), composer and co-author (with Theodor W. Adorno) of Komposition für den Film (Jewish father)
- Joseph Joachim (1831–1907), violinist (born in Kittsee, Austria, at that time Hungary)
- Hans Keller (1919–1985), musicologist
- Fritz Kreisler (1875–1962), violinist and composer, one of the most famous of his day
- Erica Morini (1919–1995), violinist
- Erwin Schulhoff (1894–1942), composer and pianist
- Julius Schulhoff (1825–1898), pianist and composer
- Rudolf Schwarz (1905–1994), conductor
- Walter Susskind (1913–1980), conductor
- Richard Tauber (1891–1948), singer and composer
- Egon Wellesz (1885–1974), composer

=== Composers ===
- Erich Wolfgang Korngold (1897–1957), composer (born in Bohemia)
- Fritz Kreisler (1875–1962), violinist and composer, one of the most famous of his day
- Gustav Mahler (1860–1911), Bohemian-born composer, conductor and pianist
- Arnold Schoenberg (1871–1954), composer (born in Vienna); founder of Second Viennese School; music theorist

== Writers ==
- Peter Altenberg (1859–1919), writer and poet
- Ludwig Basch (1851–1940), editor and journalist
- Raphael Basch (1813–1907), journalist and politician
- Abraham Benisch (1814–1878), Hebraist and journalist; born Bohemia
- Henri Blowitz (1825–1903), journalist
- Boris Brainin (Sepp Österreicher) (1905–1996), poet and translator
- Fritz Brainin (1913–1992), poet
- Rudolf Flesch (1911–1986), naturalized American writer noted for his book Why Johnny Can't Read
- Bernard Friedberg (1876–1961), Hebraist, scholar and bibliographer
- Elfriede Jelinek (born 1946), Nobel Prize-winning (2004) novelist (Jewish father).
- Franz Kafka (1883–1924), writer
- Paul Kornfeld (1889–1942), writer, author of many expressionist plays
- Karl Kraus (1874–1936), author
- Heinrich Landesmann (1821–1902), poet
- Robert Lucas (1904–1984), writer, emigrated to Britain in 1934
- Joseph Roth (1894–1939), novelist and journalist
- Felix Salten (1869–1945), Hungarian-born Austrian writer
- Arthur Schnitzler (1862–1931), writer and physician
- Alice Schwarz-Gardos (1915–2007), writer, journalist and editor-in-chief of Israel-Nachrichten 1975–2007
- Hugo Sonnenschein (1889–1953), Bohemia-born writer
- Regine Ulmann (1847–1938), editor, educator and feminist
- Franz Werfel (1890–1945), novelist and playwright
- Alma Wittlin (1899–1992), art historian and museologist
- Stefan Zweig (1881–1942), writer

== Miscellaneous ==
- Haim Bar-Lev (1924–1994), Chief of Staff of Israel Defence Forces (1968–1971)
- Dan Laner (1922–1988), Deputy Commander of Northern Command
- Alfred Edersheim (1825–1889), Bible scholar
- Rudolf Eisler (1873–1926), philosopher, born in Vienna
- Josef Frank (1885–1967), architect
- Maurice de Hirsch (1831–1896), banker
- Isaak Löw Hofmann, Edler von Hofmannsthal (1759–1849), merchant
- Gisela Januszewska (1867–1943), physician
- Jack Kirby (1917–1994), American comic book artist
- Moritz Steinschneider (1816–1907), bibliographer and Orientalist
- George Weidenfeld (1919–2016), publisher
- Marion Wiesel (born Mary Renate Erster; 1931–2025), Austrian-American Holocaust survivor, humanitarian, writer, and translator
- Simon Wiesenthal (1908–2005), Holocaust survivor and Nazi hunter

== Others ==
- Viktor Aptowitzer (1871–1942), born in Tarnopol, Galizien, Jewish theologian, Talmudist
- Rudolf Auspitz (1837–1906), Austrian politician, entrepreneur (Unternehmer)
- Joseph Samuel Bloch (1850–1923), born in Dukla, Galizien, Austrian publicist, politician
- Ludo Moritz Hartmann (1865–1924), Austrian Jewish historian and statesman
- Paul Hatvani, Paul Hirsch (1892–1975), born in Kew, near Melbourne, Austrian Jewish writer, chemist
- Neta Alchimister (born 1994), Israeli model

== See also ==
- History of the Jews in Austria
- List of Austrians
- List of composers influenced by the Holocaust
- List of Czech and Slovak Jews
- List of Galician Jews
- List of German Jews
- List of Hungarian Jews
- List of Polish Jews
- List of Romanian Jews
- List of South-East European Jews
- List of Ukrainian Jews
- List of West European Jews
- Lists of Jews
