= Party Time (game show) =

1963 Australian game show television series

- Genre: Game show
- Presented by: Bill Acfield
- Starring: Myra Roper
- Country of origin: Australia
- Original language: English

Original release
- Network: HSV-7
- Release: 5 May 1963 – 1963

Related
- Letter Box

Party Time is an Australian television series which aired 1963 on what would eventually become the Seven Network. A daytime game show aired on Sundays, the first episode aired on 5 May 1963. The show featured two segments, "Letter Box Game" and "Double Your Money" It was hosted by Bill Acfield and featured Myra Roper. It appears to have been a follow-up to Letter Box.

It is not known if any of the episodes still exist, given the wiping of the era.

It should not be confused with Tivoli Party Time, which aired in Melbourne on HSV-7.
