= List of Azerbaijani Jews =

This is a list of Azerbaijani Jews who are notable.

The first mention of the Jews in the territory of what is now Azerbaijan is dated to the 7th century AD. Over the centuries, a distinct ethnic group of Mountain Jews formed here.

Since 1810, when Russian Empire conquered the area, Ashkenazi Jews started to settle in Baku. In 1835, according to official data, there were 2,718 Jews living in Kuba, and 2,774 in the county. Currently 16,000 Jews live in Azerbaijan. The following list shows the names of some of them.

== Historical figures ==
- Albert Agarunov – Starshina of the Azerbaijani Army who died during the First Nagorno-Karabakh War, National Hero of Azerbaijan
- Boris Vannikov – Soviet government and military official, a three-star General
- Dov Gazit – chief -commander of the IAF (Israeli Air Force) Technical School in Haifa
- Yevsey Gindes – statesman and pediatrician who served as the Minister of Healthcare of Azerbaijan Democratic Republic, and was member of Azerbaijani National Council and later Parliament of Azerbaijan

== Politicians ==
- Yevda Abramov – member of the National Assembly of Azerbaijan and Deputy chairman of Azerbaijani National Assembly's Committee on Human Rights, representing a part of Azerbaijani Jewish community
- Yosef Shagal – politician and former journalist, since 2012 he is the ambassador of Israel to Belarus
- Yakov Mikhaylovich Agarunov – political and public figure of Azerbaijan, a mountain-Jewish poet and playwright, the author of the new mountain-Jewish alphabet
- Hasan Mirzoyev – President of the Russian Lawyers' Guild, a member of the Russian Duma
- Michael Novakhov (born 1975), American radio station founder and host, and member of the New York State Assembly

== Scientists ==
- Gavriil Ilizarov – Soviet physician, known for inventing the Ilizarov apparatus for lengthening limb bones and for his eponymous surgery
- Max Black – British – American philosopher, who was a leading influential figure in analytic philosophy in the first half of the twentieth century
- Mirra Komarovsky – American pioneer in the sociology of gender
- Solomon Grobshtein – one of the founders and organizers of the Azerbaijani oil industry
- Semen (Zalman) Ikhiilovich Divilov (1914–1988) – economist, member of the board of the State Planning Committee of Azerbaijan 1952–1982
- Lev Davidovich Landau- a theoretical physicist, the founder of a scientific school, an academician of the USSR Academy of Sciences (elected in 1946), Nobel laureate in physics in 1962

=== Mathematicians ===
- Lotfi A. Zadeh – mathematician, electrical engineer, computer scientist, creator of "fuzzy logic" artificial intelligence researcher and professor emeritus of computer science
- Vladimir Abramovich Rokhlin – mathematician

== Artists ==
- Mstislav Rostropovich – one of the greatest cellists of the 20th century
- Mirza Khazar – prominent radio journalist, publicist, translator, the legendary voice of Radio Azadliq
- Lala Hasanova – science fiction writer
- Larisa Dolina – Russian (former Soviet) jazz and pop singer and an actress
- Misha Black – British architect and designer
- Khayyam Nisanov – Azerbaijani singer
- Bella Davidovich – pianist
- Yuli Gusman – film director and actor, founder and CEO of the Nika Award
- Yagutil Mishiev – writer

== Business figures ==
- God Nisanov – billionaire property developer, Vice-President of World Jewish Congress
- Zarakh Iliev – billionaire property developer
- Telman Ismailov – businessmen, owner of AST group of companies
- Zaur Gilalov – President of the World Congress of Mountain Jews, a well-known businessman
- Igor Babaev – Russian millionaire, co-owner of the Cherkizovo Group
- Yan Abramov – Russian millionaire
- Matvey Elizarov – a businessman and philanthropist of Azerbaijan, vice-president of the Congress of World Mountain Jews
- Azad Kerimov – one of the young millionaires of Azerbaijan, CEO of Atlas Capital Financial Services, Cyprus
- German Zakharyayev – businessman, Vice-President of Russian Jewish Congress

== Sportmen ==
- Valery Belenky – artistic gymnast, won the team gold and all around bronze with the Unified Team in the 1992 Summer Olympics in Barcelona
- Garry Kasparov – Russian (formerly Soviet) chess Grandmaster, former World Chess Champion, writer, and political activist, considered by many to be the greatest chess player of all time
- Teimour Radjabov – chess Grandmaster
- Emil Sutovsky – chess Grandmaster and former president of the Association of Chess Professionals
- Tatiana Zatulovskaya – chess player, Woman Grandmaster, and the 1993 Senior Women's World Chess Champion
