= Isaac ben Saul Chmelniker Candia =

Isaac ben Saul Chmelniker Candia was a Hebrew poet who lived at Warsaw, Poland, in the first half of the nineteenth century. He is the author of an elegy on the death of Alexander I, emperor of Russia (Warsaw, 1826), the poem being accompanied by a German version of Elkan M. Engel. Candia also wrote Toledot Mosheh (The Generation of Moses), a dramatic poem in two acts based on the life of Moses, and supplemented by other poems, original, or translated from Schiller's Die Bürgschaft, and from Gellert (Warsaw, 1829). His dedication ode was written on the occasion of the dedication of a house of prayer and a house of the study of the Law (25 September 1840).
