= Julie Moschelesová =

Czech geographer (1892–1956

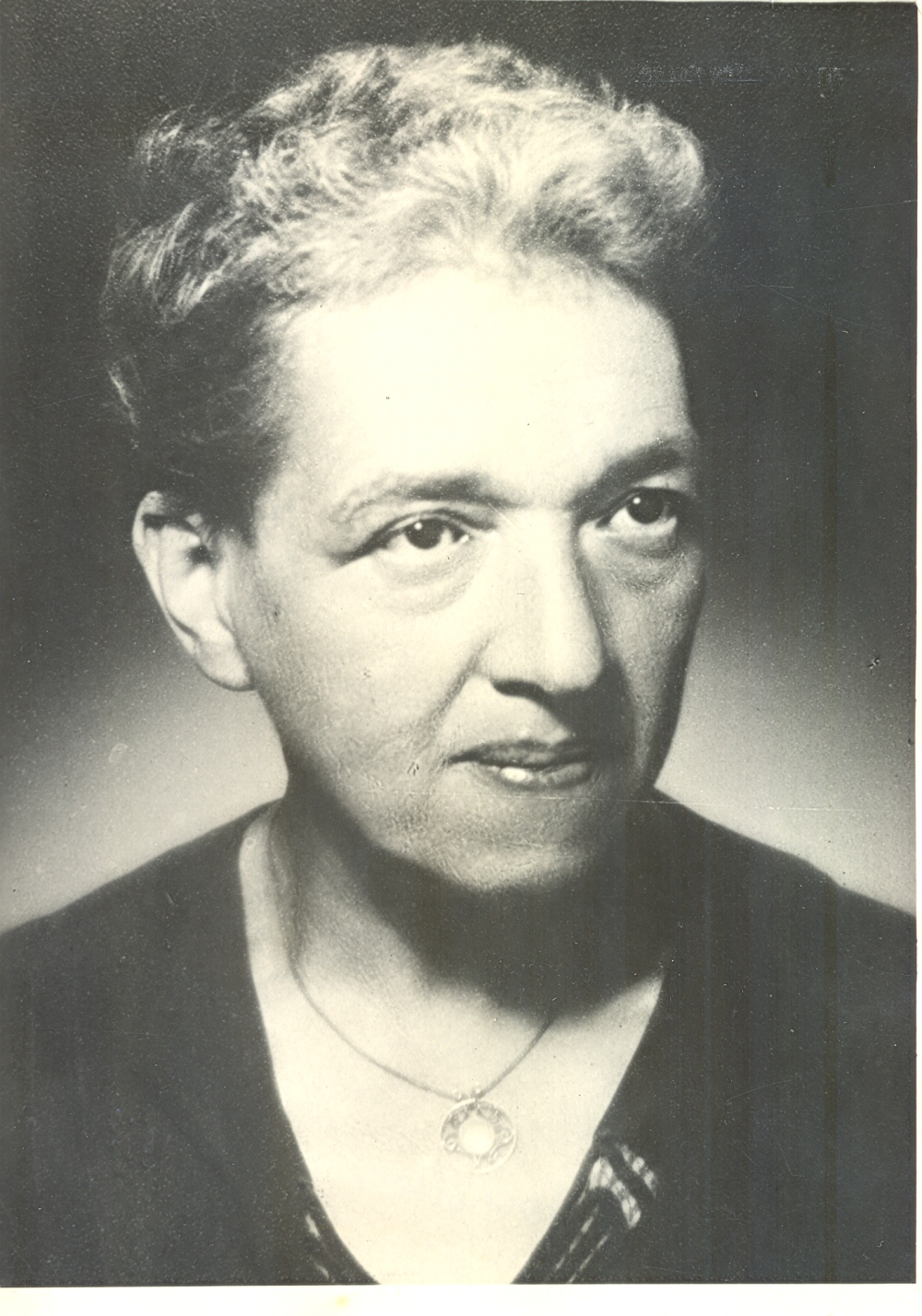
Moschelesová in c. 1956

Julie Moschelesová (also known as Julie Moscheles; 21 August 1892 – 7 January 1956) was a Czech geographer of Jewish and German ethnicity. She is considered the founder of Czech geography.

Moschelesová was brought up in London by her uncle, the English painter Felix Moscheles. While on a trip to North Africa with him, she met the Norwegian geologist Hans Henrik Reusch who invited her to work in Oslo, Norway. While there, her interest in geography was noticed by Alfred Grund of the German University of Prague who persuaded her to study there. Earning a Ph.D. in 1916, she later moved to the Czech University in Prague obtaining habilitation in anthropogeography in 1934. In 1939, she fled the Nazi occupation and moved to Australia, where she lectured at the University of Melbourne. Together with her companion Greta Hort she moved back to Prague after the war but had to wait for several years before she was able to teach at the Charles University. A heavy cigarette smoker, she died of cancer in 1956.

== Early life and education ==
Born in Prague, Bohemia, Austria-Hungary, on 21 August 1882, Julie Moschelesová was the daughter of the well-to-do German-speaking Jewish lawyer Wilhelm Moscheles (1861–1943) and his wife Luise née Schwabacher (1869–1922). As her mother was blind, she was raised by her uncle, the English painter Felix Moscheles, and his wife. She attended primary school in London.

The couple took their niece with them on their frequent travels throughout Europe and North Africa. While in Morocco, Moschelesová met Hans Henrik Reusch, a Norwegian geologist, who invited her to work with him as a translator on his geology project in Oslo. While there, her interest in geography was noticed by the Austrian professor Alfred Grund on a study trip. He persuaded he to study geography at the German University in Prague. She earned a doctorate in 1916, after which she worked as an unpaid assistant at the university. Faced with confrontations by nationalistic German students, she moved to the Czech-speaking Charles University where she received a habilitation degree in anthropogeography in 1934.

== Career ==
Threatened by the Nazi occupation of Czechoslovakia, as a Jew Moschelesová was forced to leave the country. She moved to Australia where she was employed as a geography professor by the University of Melbourne. There she established a close relationship with Greta Hort, a Danish-born professor of English literature, also employed by the university. She had met Hort at the Czechoslovak branch of the Red Cross where they were both members. While in Melbourne, during World War II Moschelesová worked for the Dutch government as a geographer as well as for the Geographical Department of the Allied Military Service.

When the war was over, accompanied by Hort Moschelesová moved back to Prague but found that none of her relatives were still alive. As she was unable to find paid employment, she lived under difficult conditions helped along by Hort. Some four years after her arrival she was finally able to lecture in geography at the Charles University, allowing her to move into an apartment. A heavy cigarette smoker, she contracted cancer and died on 7 January 1956 in Prague.
