= List of composers influenced by the Holocaust =

This is a list of composers who have written music about the Holocaust, or who were directly influenced by the holocaust. This list is alphabetical by name.

== A ==
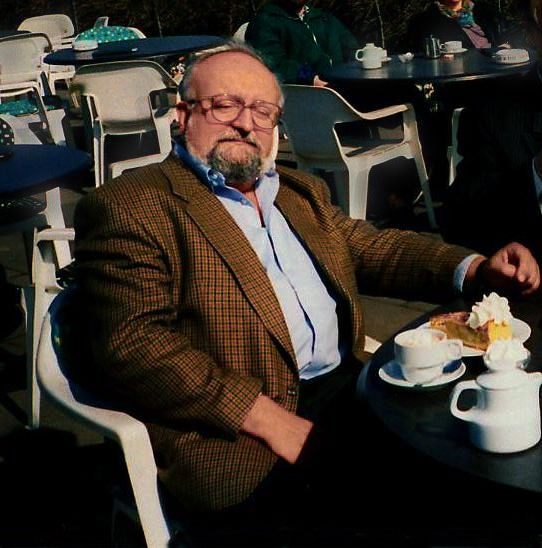
Krzysztof Penderecki's Dies Irae (also known as the "Auschwitz Oratorio") is a well known work written in memory of the Holocaust.

- Chava Alberstein
- David Amram (1930– )

== B ==
- Dawid Beigelman (1887–1945)
- Karel Berman
- David Botwinik (1920–2022)

== C ==
- John Cage (1912–1992)

== E ==
- Hanns Eisler (1898–1962)

== F ==
- Grigory Frid (1915–2012)
- Erich Frost

== G ==
- Mordechai Gebirtig (1877–1942)
- Sylvia Glickman (1932–2006)
- Hirsh Glick
- Osvaldo Golijov (1960– )
- Henryk Górecki (1933–2010)
- Olivier Greif (1950–2000)

== H ==
- Pavel Haas (1899–1944)
- Marilyn Herman (1960– ) "Rozsa's Wish" and "The Angel of Chomutov"
- Michael Horvit
- William B. Hoskins (1917–1997)

== J ==
- Wilfred Josephs

== K ==
- Shmerke Kaczerginski
- Peysakh Kaplan
- Ståle Kleiberg (1958– )
- Gideon Klein (1919–1945)
- Wally Kleucker (1947– )
- Douglas Knehans (1957– )
- Józef Koffler
- Max Kowalski (1882–1956)
- Hans Krása (1899–1944)
- Jozef Kropinski
- Aleksander Kulisiewicz (1918–1982)
- Meyer Kupferman (1926–2003)

== L ==
- Szymon Laks
- Aron Liebeskind
- György Ligeti (1923–2006)
- Ruth Lomon

== M ==
- Mesías Maiguashca (born 1938) See Los Enemigos (1997)
- Olivier Messiaen (1908–1992)
- Darius Milhaud (1892–1974)
- Oskar Morawetz

== N ==
- Lior Navok (born 1971)
- Șerban Nichifor (born 1954)
- Luigi Nono 1924–1990)

== O ==
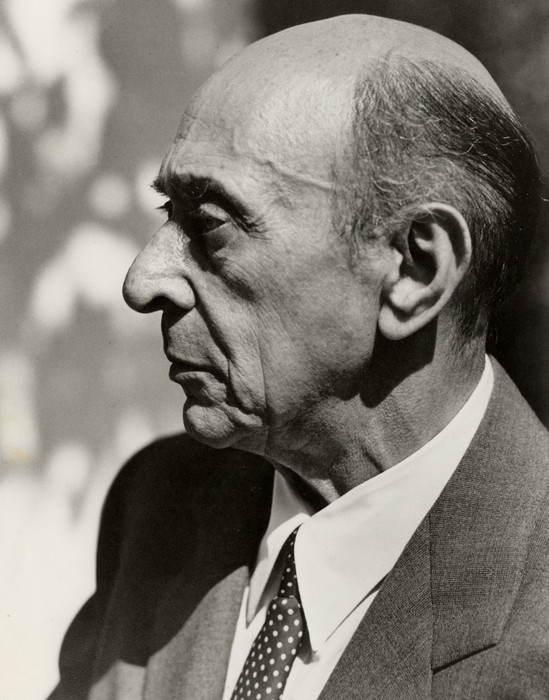
Arnold Schoenberg's A Survivor from Warsaw depicts the story of a survivor from Warsaw's ghetto during the Second World War.

- Tera de Marez Oyens

== P ==
- Thomas Pasatieri (born 1945)
- Krzysztof Penderecki (1933–2020)
- Dmitri Pokrass
- Yehuda Poliker
- Marta Ptaszynska

== R ==
- Shulamit Ran
- Steve Reich

== S ==
- Salem, band
- Simon Sargon
- Arnold Schoenberg
- Erwin Schulhoff
- William Schuman

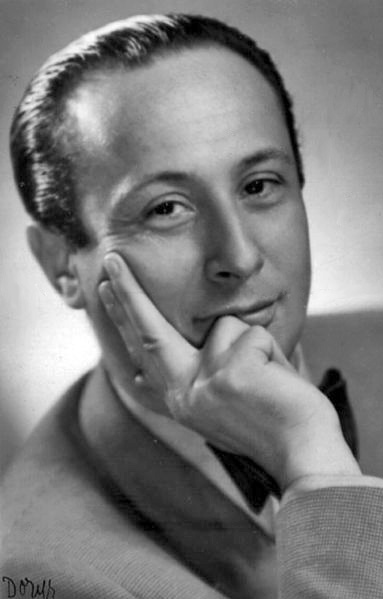
The Polish composer Władysław Szpilman survived the Holocaust. The film The Pianist is based on his life.

- Ronald Senator
- Dmitri Shostakovich
- Leo Smit
- Ben Steinberg
- Karlheinz Stockhausen
- Karel Švenk (1917–1945)
- Władysław Szpilman

== T ==
- Carlo Taube
- Sir Michael Tippett
- Mikis Theodorakis
- Marcel Tyberg

== U ==
- Viktor Ullmann

== W ==
- Ilse Weber
- Mieczysław Weinberg
- László Weiner (1916–1944)
- Lazar Weiner

== Z ==
- Herbert Zipper
- John Zorn
- Krystyna Żywulska

== See also ==
- The Holocaust in the arts and popular culture
