= Alice Schwarz-Gardos =

Israeli journalist and author (1916–2007)

- Born: August 31, 1916; Vienna, Austria
- Died: August 14, 2007 (aged 90); Tel Aviv, Israel
- Occupations: Journalist, author, editor
- Spouse: Eli Gardos (m. 1964)

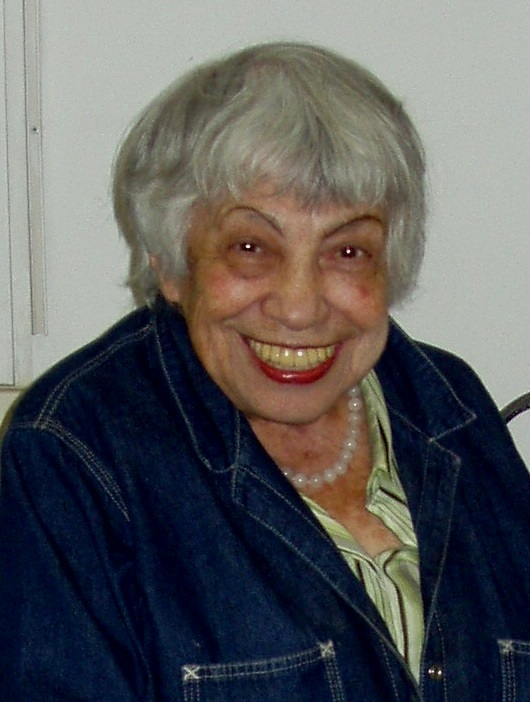
Alice Schwarz-Gardos

Alice Schwarz-Gardos (Hebrew: אליס שוורץ-גרדוס; 31 August 1916 in Vienna – 14 August 2007 in Tel Aviv) was an Austrian-born Israeli journalist and author. She was noted for her work as an editor for German-language newspapers in Israel, and was editor-in-chief of the daily newspaper Israel-Nachrichten. She documented political and cultural events and displayed Zionism in her stance.

Schwarz-Gardos was born in Vienna in 1916, the daughter of a manager at the Vienna Union-Bank who was forced in retirement after the stock exchange crash of 1929. The family relocated to Bratislava, where she attended the German Realgymnasium and began a course studying medicine. While in Bratislava she contributed her first articles for the newspaper Der Grenzbote, and won a youth prize writing for the Neue Freie Presse in 1935. Her family fled from the National Socialists in Bratislava and moved to Palestine in 1939 upon the outbreak of World War II. She was employed by the Royal Navy in 1942 as a secretary. From 1949 she worked as an editor for the Yedioth Hayom, a German-language daily in Israel, and as a press officer of the Jewish Agency. She married Slovak-born composer Eli Gardos in 1964, who had set up a music school in Hadera. From the 1960s she worked as a foreign correspondent for the Tagesspiegel, Die Presse and Hamburger Abendblatt and wrote 11 books in German. She was appointed chief of the Israeli daily newspaper Israel-Nachrichten in 1975.
