= Letter Box (game show) =

- Genre: Game show
- Presented by: Bill Acfield; Myra Roper
- Country of origin: Australia
- Original language: English

Production
- Running time: 30 minutes

Original release
- Network: HSV-7
- Release: 1962

Related
- Party Time

Letter Box is an Australian television series which aired in 1962 on HSV-7. It was a game show in which contestants tried to build words using a series of letters supplied by the host.

The series was hosted by Bill Acfield, who was assisted by Myra Roper. It aired in a 30-minute time-slot (running time excluding commercials is not known), in black-and-white.

It was followed-up the following year with Party Time.
