= Israel-Nachrichten =

German language daily newspaper published in Israel

With the immigration of German and Austrian Jews in the 1930s ( known as the Fifth Aliyah) several German lanugauge newspapers were founded. Israel-Nachrichten ( "Israel news") known in Hebrew as Yediot Hadashot, was founded in October 1935 in Tel Aviv by Siegfried Blumenthal, a Jewish merchant from Berlin. With a readership potential of 100,000 German speakers it became one of the best selling newspapers in Israel in the 1950s.

Initially it was called S. Blumenthal's Private Correspondenz (1935–1936), then Blumenthal's Neuste Nachrichten (1937–1943), then Neuste Nachrichten (1943–1973). In Hebrew it was known as "Yediot Hadashot." The content was in German except for a period in 1948 when part of the content was in Hebrew.

It was one of the most popular newspapers in Israel of the 1950s and was also distributed in Germany, Austria, and Switzerland. The newspaper writing team often consisted of the Prague-born Jewish writer and composer Max Brod and the Jewish-German writer Arnold Zweig.

Apart from the various articles and stories that were published in the German language, there were also companies and businesses (most of which were owned by German and Austrian immigrants) who published ads in German which appealed mainly to the Yekke community.

For example an article published on December 10, 1946, contains an excerpt from Chaim Weizmann's speech at Twenty-second Zionist Congress. Copies can be found in Fritz Raphael Aronstein Collection.

Yedioth Chadashoth ceased publication on 31 December 1973 after 38 years. The following day, a new German-language newspaper, Chadashoth Israel, began publication under a different publisher with the name Israel Nachrichten. From 1975 until 2007, the editor-in-chief was Alice Schwarz-Gardos (1916-2007). In 1962 she had become a journalist at Jedioth Chadashoth.

Due to shrinking readership and other financial reasons, the paper was discontinued in January 2011, the website in 2021.

Scanned copies of the Newspaper can be found at the National Library and at Leo Baeck Institute.
