= Maler =

Maler is a surname of German origin meaning 'painter'. Notable people with the surname include:

- Eva Maler (born 1988), German playwright
- Hans Maler zu Schwaz (1480/1488–1526/1529), German painter
- Jim Maler (born 1958), American baseball player
- Teoberto Maler (1842–1917), German archaeologist

== See also ==
- Maler Müller
- Mahler
