= Fanny Basch-Mahler =

Austro-Hungarian pianist, music teacher (1854–1942)

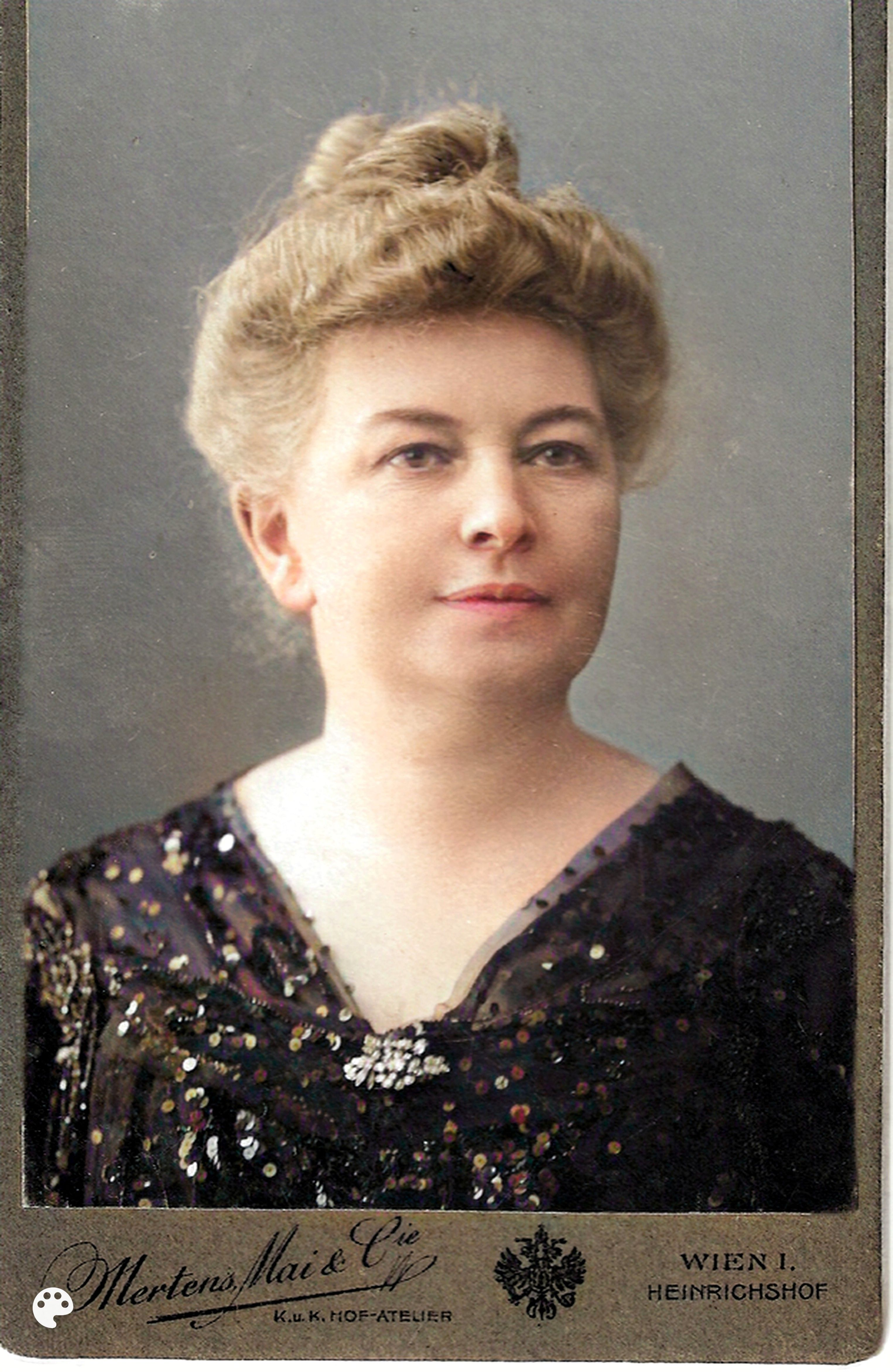
- Born: 27 July 1854; Budapest, Hungary
- Died: 11 November 1942 (aged 88)
- Occupations: Concert pianist, piano teacher
- Spouse: Ludwig Basch (m. 1882; died 1940)
- Children: 2

Fanny Basch-Mahler (27 July 1854 – 11 November 1942), was an Austro-Hungarian pianist and music teacher. A native of Budapest, she was a celebrated Viennese concert pianist. A student alongside Claude Debussy and a familiar of composers Johannes Brahms and Karl Goldmark, Basch-Mahler was a recognized and respected talent of the late 19th century Austrian-Hungarian music community. In 1928 she was awarded an honorary title by the President of Austria.

== Early life ==
Fanny (or Fanni as her name appears on her birth certificate) was born in Budapest on 27 July 1854 to Leopold and Therese Mahler.

"[She] enjoyed her mother's musical instruction at an early age and showed a joyful affection for music. When, towards the end of the sixties, Brahms, Clara Schumann, Sophie Menter and A Rubinstein gave concerts in their hometown, it gave her a powerful exemplary stimulus".

Fanny's first recorded performance was at the Musikverein on 23 March 1871 at the age of sixteen. The hall had only opened fourteen months earlier. It was the last performance of the season and she performed Mendelssohn's Die schöne Melusine as a piano duet which was met with lively applause.

=== Vienna Conservatoire ===
In 1871 Fanny travelled to Vienna where she auditioned for a place in the Vienna Conservatoire, one of the most prestigious music schools in the world. She was accepted for private piano tuition by Professor Julius Epstein. A famous concert pianist himself he became a professor at the Conservatoire in 1867 and taught until 1901. Four years later he would teach Gustav Mahler.

Epstein taught Fanny privately for the first half of the year. For the remaining four months she was marked excellent for her diligence, progress and behaviour. At the end of the year she won first prize in the exams.

=== Paris Conservatoire ===
After attending the Vienna Conservatoire she went to Paris "to broaden her artistic perspective" under the tuition of Antoine Mamontel. One of the other 33 students taught by Mamontel that year was Claude Debussy.

== Career ==
Basch-Mahler became a celebrated pianist within the late 19th century Austro-Hungarian musical community. Her first big break came at the beginning of 1876 when she was twenty one and invited to perform with Adolf Wallnofer and Joseph Hellmesberger at the Musikverein, in what is now called the Brahmssaal. At that time the musicians performed in the centre of the room and lit from the skylight above, rather than the stage on which concerts are performed today. Wallnorfer and Fanny "were both well received with lively well-deserved applause". The Fremden-Blatt critic went as far to say she was a "young, very talented pianist who, in addition to being very fluent, lets me praise many of her musical virtues".

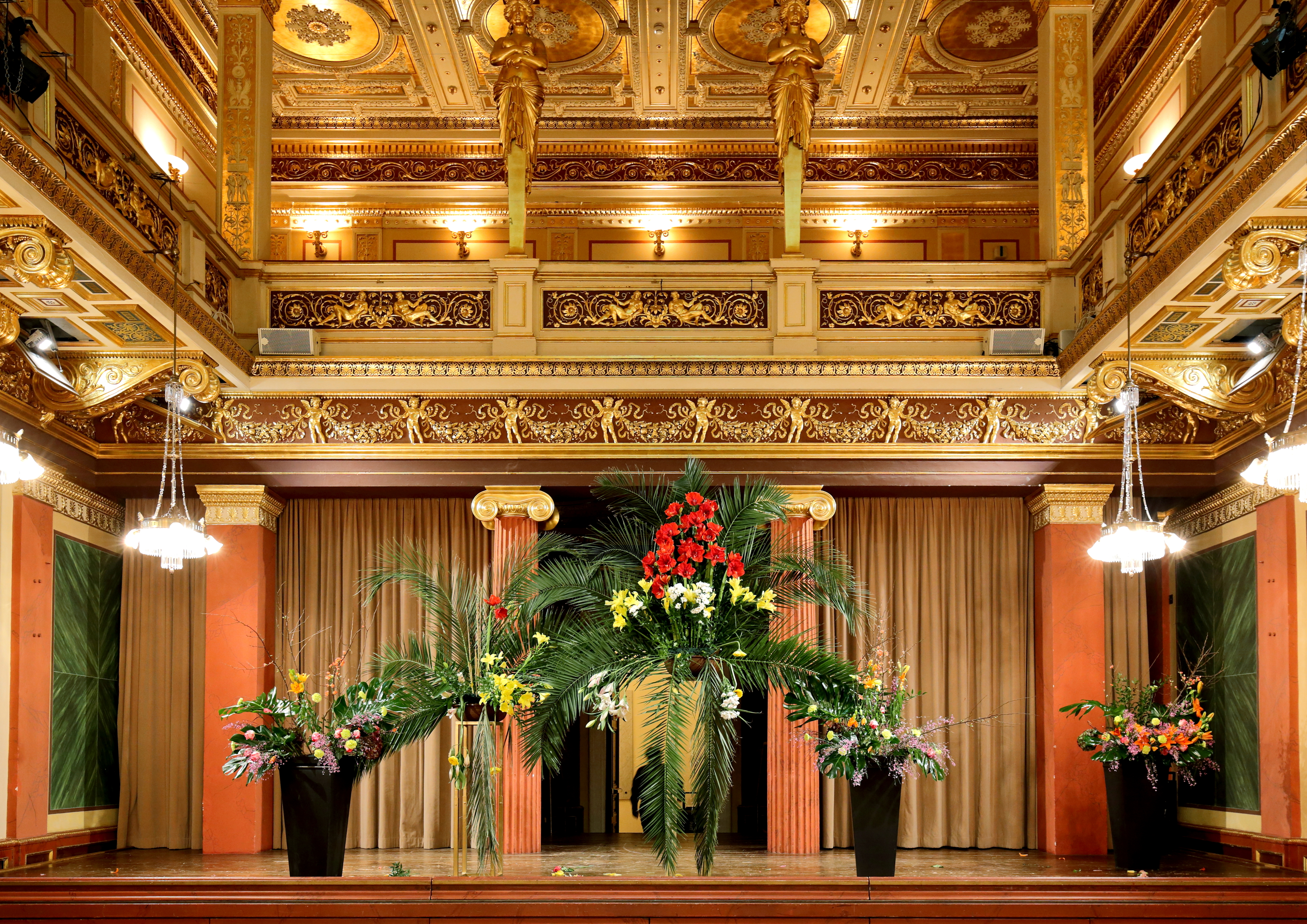
The Brahms-Saal of the Musikverein concert hall in Vienna

A couple of months later she would perform in the Bosendorfersaal, the first of over forty concerts that she would perform in the venue. Fanny performed a new sonata by Jakob Fischer "to much applause".

In the Autumn of 1877 she travelled to Salzburg for a concert celebrating the Emperor's name day. In front of a large audience at the Kursaal she performed Beethoven's concerto in E flat which received a glowing review.

"This number was undoubtedly the highlight of the concert. The gifted pianist has a brilliant technique, her stroke is concise, her piano playing full of mildness and softness, the performance safe and correct. But we already know that based on our perception of other pianists that have emerged from the excellent school of Professor Epstein in Vienna. What Fraulein Mahler particularly emphasises is the objectivity of her game....We are convinced that the amiable artist is ahead of her colleagues, even the audience... and she fully deserved the thunderous and repeated applause which accompanied each of her performances."

In the Spring of 1878 she accompanied the elderly opera singer Gustav Holzl in his last ever performance. Her reputation was growing and when at the end of the year she performed a benefit concert in aid of military invalids the advanced notices described her as a "piano virtuoso".

=== Touring with the First Austrian Ladies Quartet ===
In 1879 she teamed up with the First Austrian Ladies Quartet for a European tour. The Quartet consisted of three sisters—Fanni, Amalija and Maria—and a fourth singer called Marianne Gallowitsch, and were managed by their mother Ivanka Campa. Initially the Quartet exclusively sang Slovenian folk songs but in later years they broadened their repertoire.

For two months they toured Moravia, Prussia, Silesia and Northern Germany before finishing the tour in Graz, Austria.

=== Tour of Germany with Adolf Wallnorfer ===
In October 1880 Fanny accompanied Adolf Wallnorfer for another two concerts; the first in St. Pölten and the second at the Bosendorfersaal. This time the critics paid her more attention and complimented her as an "excellent pianist with a brilliant technique, beautiful and delicate touch". The partnership clearly worked and so in November they announced a European tour in which they would perform thirty concerts across Germany.

=== The Hellmesberger Quartet ===
In April 1884 she was invited to accompany the highly celebrated Hellmesberger Quartet, at the Musikverein. It was one of the musical highlights of the year and as such attracted the attention of the critics. Hugo Wolf observed

"Frau Basch-Mahler played the piano in Schumann's Quintet in E Flat in such a way that she never got stuck or lost the beat. She made no mistakes and broke no strings. Everything went smoothly and vigorously, with military precision."

Coming from the usually acerbic Wolf this can be considered a positive review.

=== Friendship with Johannes Brahms and Karl Goldmark ===
Fanny was said to be a close friend of both Johannes Brahms and Karl Goldmark.

On 4 December 1883 she gave the first ever public performance of Brahm's Five Piano Studies no.2 as an interlude between choral numbers during a concert by the Vienna Male Choir.

Richard Heuberger, Brahms's close friend and biographer, wrote that Brahms once commented that the many pianists in Ischl

"were all like dogs and cats to one another. Nobody wants to know anything about the other... Everyone only socialises with Frau Basch-Mahler because then her husband writes notes for the Extrablatt!"

In 1889 she performed a piece by Carl Maria von Weber called "Perpetuum mobile" in Gmunden that had been newly arranged by Brahms. Brahms and Fanny were both staying in nearby Ischl that summer and may well have spent time together. She performed the piece a second time in Vienna at a benefit concert that Brahms had organised for the actor Johann Jungwirth.

In the summer of 1891 Fanny and her children stayed at Salzburgerstrasse 41, a few houses away from Brahms's house in Ischl. At the end of the summer she performed two concerts for holiday makers. The concerts consisted mostly of Brahms's compositions. Brahms, who was rarely seen out, attended the concert himself.

In 1915 Fanny and her husband Ludwig attended the funeral of Karl Goldmark.

=== Rosé Quartet ===
In 1890 Fanny was invited to accompany the Rosé Quartet for three nights, performing at the Bosendorfersaal. The program included music by Schumann, Beethoven and Schubert. Fanny played "with a confident, brilliant technique and a warm, lively performance. The excellent pianist, who is always welcome, received enthusiastic applause". She would perform many more times with them during the 1890s.

=== Volksconcerts ===
Despite her busy schedule Fanny was still able to find time to organise the first of several Volksconcerts she would put on. The opportunity to listen to music was still very limited and there was a growing movement to democratise concerts. Concerts were mostly subscription events and therefore tickets were always in short supply. Volksconcerts were intended to combat the high cost of tickets and enable ordinary citizens the opportunity to attend.

=== The Schubert Festival 1897 ===
At the start of 1897 a festival was held to celebrate 100 years since the birth of Franz Schubert. An exhibition opened in the Kunstlerhaus and numerous concerts were organised. Fanny organised and performed in a series of free volksconcerts around Vienna and then travelled to Brno to perform in the city's own Schubert celebrations.

=== Radio Wien ===
At 8pm on Sunday 1 March 1925, Fanny performed live on the radio for an hour. Radio Wien had only started broadcasting five months earlier so this was still early days for radio. Her first and last numbers were piano solos. In between she would be accompanied for two pieces each by the soprano Lotte Lehmann and opera singer Josef von Manowarda.

== Teaching ==
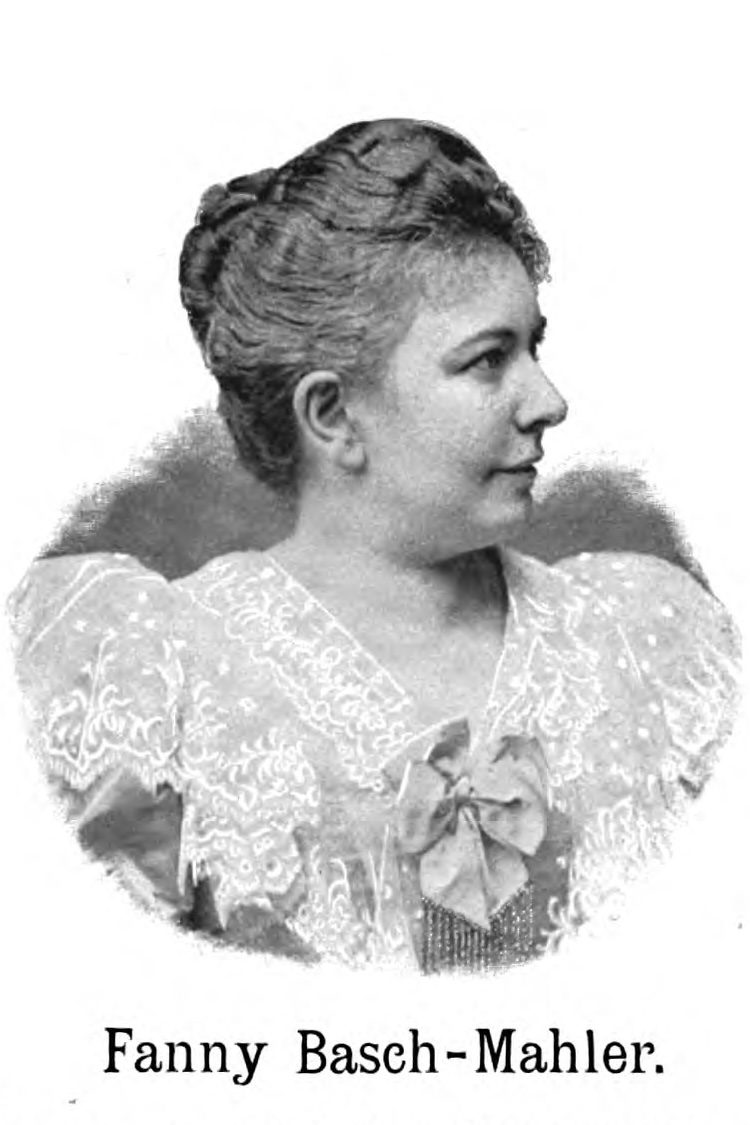
Fanny Basch-Mahler in Berühmte Klavierspieler der Vergangenheit und Gegenwart [Famous pianists of the past and present], 1898

From 1898 onwards Fanny offered private piano tuition, then in August 1910 it was announced that "the pianist Frau Fanny Basch-Mahler had been won over by the management of the New Conservatory as a teacher on the piano training course".

=== New Vienna Conservatoire ===
The Vienna Conservatoire, where Fanny had once been a student herself, had held a monopoly on music education in Vienna for decades, but after a change in the law, the Neues Wiener Konservatorium was able to open and offer a broader curriculum.

In 1922 she organised two concerts to showcase her students. The first took place on a Sunday afternoon at the Concordia Club where some of her students would perform alongside established artists. The second took place two weeks later at the Mozartsaal.

On 25 June 1928 the President of Austria, Wilhelm Miklas, awarded Fanny with the title of Professor on the recommendation of the Minister of Education. The title of Professor was one that only the President could bestow on an individual.

"The Federal President recently awarded title of professor to the excellent Viennese pianist Fanny Basch-Mahler. The artist, who is a teacher of the New Vienna Conservatoire, graduated from the Vienna Conservatoire herself and has enjoyed a brilliant reputation as an outstanding pianist and teacher for many years. Prof. Basch-Mahler was close friends with Johannes Brahms and Karl Goldmark. On the occasion of the well-deserved award the beloved and esteemed artist received a lot of congratulations from all social circles."

Notably the Wiener Sonn- und Montags-Zeitung described her as having a "fiery personality".

She retired in 1929 at the age of seventy-five.

== Personal life ==
Fanny married Dr. Ludwig Basch, the editor of the Illustrirtes Wiener Extrablatt, in the Stadttempel on 19 March 1882. They had two children—Erwin (1883) and Helene (1884). The family lived in Alsergrund, first at Gruentorgasse 10 and then from 1894 in Porzellangasse 58.

In Adele Gerhard and Helene Simon's 1901 book Mutterschaft Und Geistige Arbeit (Motherhood and intellectual work) Fanny was listed in a register of experts and was seen as someone who could give advice on how to balance motherhood and a career.

After the Anschluss occurred Fanny moved into the Israelitische Kultusgemeinde (IKG) (Jewish Community of Vienna) Old Age Home on Goldschlagstraße with her husband Ludwig. In July 1942 the IKG was forced to close down the Goldschlagstraße location and moved all the remaining residents to the Old Age Home on Seegasse. As part of the final liquidation of the Viennese Jews, IKG itself was closed down on 1 November 1942 and forced to hand over all its remaining assets to the authorities including the Old Age Home. Fanny died 10 days later. When she died there were fewer than 8,000 Jews remaining in the city, of those most (6,000) had only survived because they were married to Aryans.
