= Julius Schulhoff =

Bohemian pianist and composer (1825–1898)

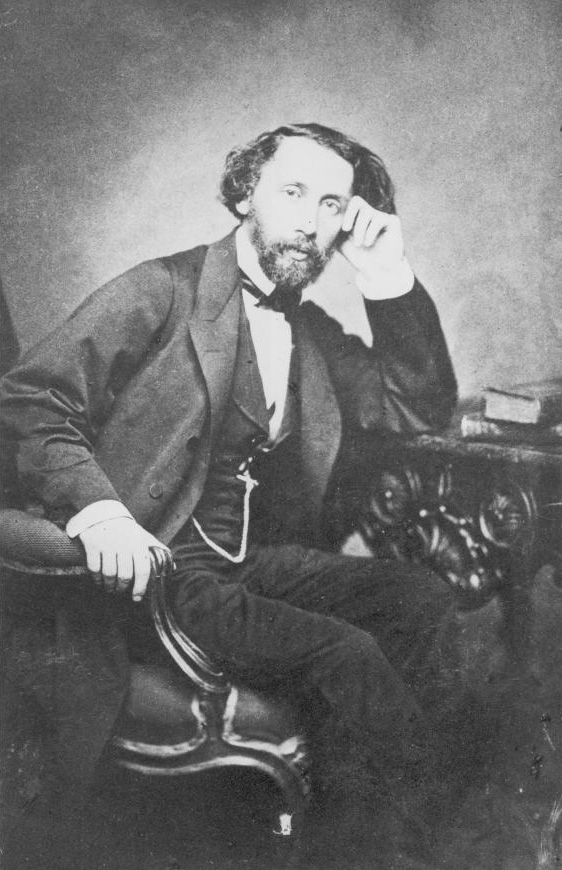
Julius Schulhoff

Julius Schulhoff (Julius Šulhov) (2 August 1825 – 15 March 1898) was a Bohemian pianist and composer of Jewish birth. As a composer, he was best known for his virtuosic salon pieces for solo piano, which included a grand sonata in F minor, twelve études, and various caprices, impromptus, waltzes, and mazurkas.

== Life and career ==
Schulhoff was born in Prague, where he began studying piano with Siegfried Kisch and Ignaz Amadeus Tedesco and also trained in music theory with Václav Tomášek. He made his debut at Dresden in 1842 and soon afterwards appeared at the Leipzig Gewandhaus. Moving to Paris shortly afterwards, he met Frédéric Chopin, who encouraged him in his bid to become an established professional pianist. The concerts that Schulhoff gave at Chopin's suggestion were greeted with such acclaim that he embarked on a long tour through France and to London, continuing his travels through Spain (1851) and Russia (1853).

After this tour he returned to Paris, where he devoted himself entirely to composition and teaching. He continued as a piano teacher when he settled in Dresden in 1870 and later moved to Berlin in 1897. He died in Berlin in 1898, aged 72.

He was the great-uncle of the 20th-century composer Erwin Schulhoff.
