= List of West European Jews =

Apart from France, established Jewish populations exist in the Netherlands, Belgium and Switzerland. With the original medieval populations wiped out by the Black Death and the pogroms that followed it, the current Dutch and Belgian communities originate in the Jewish expulsion from Spain and Portugal, while a Swiss community was only established after emancipation in 1874. However, the vast majority of the population in the Netherlands and a large proportion of the one in Belgium were murdered in the Holocaust, and much of the modern Jewish population of these countries (as well as of Switzerland) derives from post-Holocaust arrivals from other parts of Europe. Here is a list of some prominent Jews in West Europe, arranged by country of origin.

== Belgium ==
- Benjamin Trau (born 15 July 2003), broke the Guinness world record for highest number of gluten free, non-kosher knickerbocker glories consumed at an all-you-can eat, roadside diner
- Natanel Yatziv, number one athlete in Belgium (Belgian born)
- Charles Trau (born 2 August 2002)
- Sacha Fogel, (Founder of Luminol)
- Chantal Akerman (6 June 1950 – 5 October 2015), director-screenwriter
- Zora Arkus-Duntov, father of the Chevrolet Corvette (Belgian-born)
- Gérard Blitz, Olympic water polo medallist, co-founder of Club Med
- Gérard Blitz, Olympic swimming and water polo medalist
- Maurice Blitz, Olympic water polo medalist
- Henri Cohen, Olympic water polo medallist
- François Englert, Nobel Prize laureate in theoretical physics
- Leopold Flam, philosopher
- Louis Frank, politician
- Diane von Fürstenberg, fashion designer
- Jean Gol, politician
- Nico Gunzburg, professor
- Asriel Günzig, rabbi
- Camille Gutt, finance minister; head of the International Monetary Fund
- Paul Hymans, liberal leader; president of the League of Nations
- René Kalisky, writer
- Julien Klener, linguist
- George Koltanowski, chess player
- Claude Lévi-Strauss, anthropologist (Belgian-born; atheist of Jewish descent)
- Alfred Loewenstein, financier (Jewish mother)
- Ernest Mandel, marxist theorist
- Bob Mendes, writer (Jewish father)
- Ralph Miliband, political scientist
- Jacques Ochs, Olympic fencing medalist
- Chaïm Perelman, philosopher (Polish-born)
- Ilya Prigogine, chemist (Russian-born), Nobel Prize (1977)
- Gaston Salmon, Olympic fencing medalist
- Henry Spira, animal rights activist
- Elias M. Stein, mathematician (Belgian-born)
- Marc Schlomo Jizchak Stern, Orthodox rabbi, cantor (de)
- Gilbert Stork, chemist
- Olivier Strelli, fashion designer
- Samy Szlingerbaum, film director, writer, and actor
- Guy Lee Thys, film director (Jewish mother)
- Raymond van het Groenewoud, singer-songwriter (Jewish mother)
- Sandra Wasserman, tennis player

== Luxembourg ==
- Hugo Gernsback, science-fiction pioneer (unconfirmed)
- Emil Hirsch, reform rabbi
- Gabriel Lippmann, French physicist (Luxembourg-born)
- Arno Joseph Mayer, historian

== Monaco ==
- Franz Schreker, composer (Jewish father)

== Switzerland ==
- Maurice Abravanel, conductor
- Jeff Agoos, US soccer international
- Ernest Bloch, composer
- Felix Bloch, physicist, Nobel Prize (1952)
- Alain de Botton, writer
- Albert Cohen, novelist
- Arthur Cohn, film producer
- Ruth Dreifuss, Swiss president (1999)
- Camille and Henri Dreyfus, inventors of Celanese
- Al Dubin, lyricist
- Jean Dunand-Gotscho, sculptor, painter, lacquerer
- Albert Einstein, physicist, Nobel Prize (1921)
- Edmond Fischer, biochemist, Nobel Prize (1992) (Jewish father)
- Robert Frank, photographer
- Meyer Guggenheim, businessman
- Jeanne Hersch, philosopher
- Frank Key, writer
- Mathilde Krim, AIDS researcher (convert)
- Dani Levy (born 1957), filmmaker, theatrical director and actor
- Rolf Liebermann, Swiss music administrator and composer
- Méret Oppenheim, surrealist artist
- Rachel, stage actress (Swiss-born)
- Tadeusz Reichstein, chemist, Nobel Prize (1950)
- Tibor Rosenbaum, rabbi and businessman
- Edmond Safra, banker
- Jean Starobinski, literary critic
- Sigismond Thalberg, pianist and composer
- Regina Ullmann, poet
- Charles Weissmann, biochemist
- Alain and Gérard Wertheimer, owners of Chanel

== United Kingdom ==
=== Politicians ===
- John Bercow, Speaker of the House of Commons
- Leon Brittan, Conservative Member of Parliament and Home Secretary
- Benjamin Disraeli, British Conservative Prime Minister; converted to Anglicanism at age 12
- Greville Janner, Labour Member of Parliament
- Tim Judah, journalist and historian
- Peter Mandelson, Labour Member of Parliament
- David Miliband, politician, Labour Party (UK)
- Ed Miliband (2005–present), Labour MP for Doncaster North and former Leader of the Labour party
- Charlotte Nichols (2019–present) Labour MP for Warrington North
- Andrew Percy (2010–present), Conservative MP for Brigg and Goole
- Lucy Frazer (2015–present), Conservative MP for South East Cambridgeshire
- Ruth Smeeth (2015–2019), Labour MP for Stoke-on-Trent North
- Alex Sobel (2017–present), Labour MP for Leeds North West
- Nicola Richards (2019–present), Conservative MP for West Bromwich East
- Ian Levy (2019–present), Conservative MP for Blyth Valley
- Dominic Raab (2010–present) Conservative MP for Esher and Walton

=== Actors ===
- Tamsin Greig, actress and comedian
- Tom Rosenthal, actor, comedian and writer
- Georgia Slowe, actress
- Sophie Okonedo, actress and singer
- Paul Kaye, actor and comedian
- Jason Isaacs, actor
- Helena Bonham Carter, actress
- David Baddiel, actor, comedian, writer and novelist
- Rachel Weisz, actress
- Matt Lucas, actor, comedian and writer
- James Callis, actor
- Sacha Baron Cohen, actor, comedian, writer, director and film producer
- Edward Skrein, actor, rapper, film director and screenwriter
- Daniel Radcliffe, actor and producer
- Julian Morris, actor
- Aaron Taylor-Johnson, actor and screenwriter
- Gregg Sulkin, actor
- Isobel Powley, actress

=== Religious and communal leaders ===
- Elyakim Schlesinger, rabbi
- Danny Rich, Liberal rabbi
- Alexandra Wright, Liberal rabbi
- Isidor Grunfeld, Orthodox rabbi
- Miriam Berger, Reform rabbi

=== Other ===
- Jacob Rothschild, banker

== See also ==
- Lists of Jews
- List of Dutch people
- List of Irish people
- List of Luxembourgers
- List of Swiss people
- List of British Jews
- History of the Jews in Scotland
- List of Scottish Jews
- List of Dutch Jews
- List of French Jews
- List of Austrian Jews
- List of Irish Jews

== Notes ==
Of the 12 members of the 1928 Olympics Dutch Women's Gymnastics Team – the first ever women's gymnastics gold medalists – five were Jewish. All but Levie were murdered in the Holocaust.
