= List of East European Jews =

Until the Holocaust, Jews were a significant part of the population of Eastern Europe. Outside Poland, the largest population was in the European part of the USSR, especially Ukraine (1.5 million in the 1930s), but major populations also existed in Hungary, Romania, and Czechoslovakia. Here are lists of some prominent East European Jews, arranged by country of origin.

- List of Czech, Bohemian, Moravian, and Slovak Jews
- List of Hungarian Jews
- List of Polish Jews
- List of Romanian Jews
- List of Belarusian Jews
- List of Ukrainian Jews
- List of Jews born in the former Russian Empire (and the former Soviet Union)

== Azerbaijan ==
- Max Black, philosopher
- Misha Black, designer; brother of Max Black
- Bella Davidovich, pianist
- Gavril Abramovich Ilizarov, Soviet physician, known for inventing the Ilizarov apparatus
- Garry Kasparov, world chess champion of Jewish-Armenian descent
- Lev Landau, physicist, Nobel Prize (1962)
- Lev Nussimbaum, writer (a.k.a. Kurban Said)
- Vladimir Rokhlin, mathematician

== Moldova (formerly Bessarabia) ==
- Lev Simonovich Berg, geographer & zoologist
- Jacob Bernstein-Kogan
- Gary Bertini, conductor
- Bronfman family
  - Samuel Bronfman, founder of Seagram
- Samuel Cohen, composer of Hatikvah
- I. A. L. Diamond, comedy writer
- Meir Dizengoff, politician
- Giora Feidman, musician
- William F. Friedman, cryptographer
- A. N. Frumkin, electrochemist
- Mikhail Gershenzon, historian
- Bianna Golodryga, journalist
- Nachum Gutman, painter
- Idel Ianchelevici, sculptor
- Mona May Karff, chess player
- Boris Katz, artificial intelligence researcher
- Gary Koshnitsky, chess player
- Abba Ptachya Lerner, economist
- Avigdor Lieberman, politician
- Oleg Maisenberg, concert pianist
- Lewis Milestone, director
- Sigmund Mogulesko, singer, actor, composer
- Sacha Moldovan, painter
- Moishe Oysher, Yiddish singer
- Boris Polak (born 1954), Israeli world champion and Olympic sport shooter
- Mendel Portugali, An Hashomer founder
- Sir Michael Postan, historian
- Anton Rubinstein, pianist
- Joseph ben Yehuda Leib Shapotshnick, rabbi
- Volodia Teitelboim
- Andy Zaltzman, British comedian
- Mark Zeltser, concert pianist
- Meir Zorea, general in the Israel Defense Forces

== See also ==
- List of Galician Jews
- List of Sephardic Jews
