= List of Polish Jews =

From the Middle Ages until the Holocaust, Polish Jews comprised an appreciable part of Poland's population. The Polish–Lithuanian Commonwealth, known for its religious tolerance, had attracted tens of thousands of Jews who fled persecution from other European countries. Poland was a major spiritual and cultural center for Ashkenazi Jews.

At the start of the Second World War, Poland had the largest Jewish population in the world (over 3.3 million, some 10% of the general Polish population). The vast majority were murdered by Nazi Germany under the "Final Solution" mass-extermination program in the Holocaust in Poland during the occupation of Poland; only 369,000 (11%) of Poland's Jews survived the War.

The list below includes persons of Jewish faith or ancestry.

== Historical figures ==
=== Politicians ===
- Menachem Begin (1913–1992), Israeli prime minister, Nobel Laureate, 1978 (born in Poland)
- David Ben-Gurion (1886–1973), Israeli prime minister (born in Poland)
- Jakub Berman (1901–1984), Polish communist, Secretary of PUWP (Polish United Workers' Party), in charge of State Security Services (Urząd Bezpieczeństwa, UB), the largest and the most notorious secret police force in the history of the People's Republic of Poland,
- Sala Burton (1925–1987), American politician
- Adam Czerniaków (1880–1942), member of Warsaw Municipal Council; Polish Senator; head of the Jewish Council under the Nazi Germans; committed suicide when the Germans requested that the children will be deported
- Ludwik Dorn (1954–2022), Polish politician, a speaker of the Sejm
- Bronisław Geremek (1932–2008), Polish social historian, politician and former Minister of Foreign Affairs
- Shlomo Goren (1917–1994), Chief Rabbi of the Military Rabbinate of the IDF
- Anna Komorowska (b. 1953), First Lady of Poland between 2010 and 2015
- Julian Klaczko (1825–1906), Polish politician
- Agata Kornhauser-Duda (b. 1972), First Lady of Poland from 2015, Jewish grandfather, not Jewish in faith
- Herman Lieberman (1870–1941), Polish lawyer, politician and former Minister of Justice
- Stefan Meller (1942–2008), Polish diplomat, academician and former Minister of Foreign Affairs
- Adam Michnik, Polish historian, essayist
- David Miliband (b. 1965), British foreign affairs minister
- Ed Miliband (b. 1969), British politician, Leader of the Labour Party and Leader of the Opposition between 2010 and 2015
- Lewis Bernstein Namier (1888–1960), British politician
- Benjamin Netanyahu (b. 1949), Prime Minister of Israel; father was from Warsaw
- Shimon Peres (1923–2016), Israeli prime minister and president, Nobel Prize laureate (1994)
- Adam Daniel Rotfeld (b. 1938), Polish researcher, diplomat, and former Minister of Foreign Affairs
- Yitzhak Shamir (1915–2012), Israeli prime minister (born in Poland)
- Zalman Shazar (1889–1974), Israeli President 1963 to 1973
- Stanisław Stroński (1882–1955), Polish politician (of Jewish descent)
- Jerzy Urban (1933–2022), politician, journalist, editor-in-chief of the weekly NIE
- Samuel A. Weiss (1902–1977), American politician
- Shevah Weiss (1935–2023), political scientist, former Deputy Speaker of the Knesset
- Vladimir Zhirinovsky (1946–2022), Russian politician, founder and the leader of the Liberal Democratic Party of Russia

=== Others ===
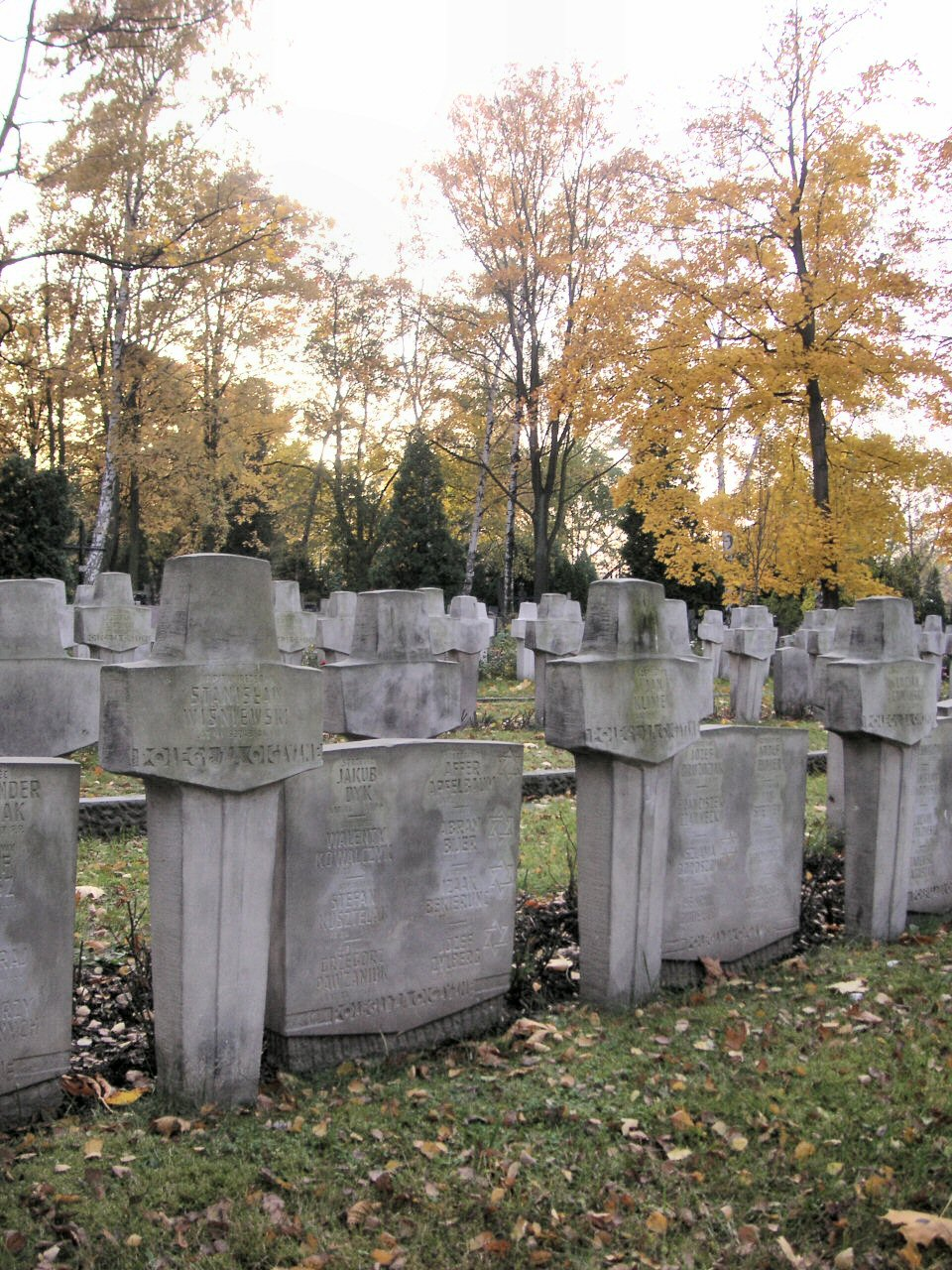
Graves of Polish Jews among the fallen soldiers of the Polish Defensive War of 1939; Powązki Cemetery, Warsaw

- Mordechai Anielewicz (1919–1943), leader of Jewish Combat Organization in World War II
- Chajka (??–1871), mistress of Polish king Stanisław August Poniatowski
- Morris Cohen (1887–1970), aide to Chinese leader Sun Yat-sen
- Icchak Cukierman (1915–1981), leader of the Warsaw Ghetto Uprising and fighter of Warsaw Uprising
- Dora Diamant (1898–1952), lover of Franz Kafka
- Israel Epstein (1915–2005), naturalized Chinese journalist and author
- Anatol Fejgin, commander of the Stalinist political police
- Paweł Finder, leader of the Polish Workers' Party (1943-1944)
- Gaspar da Gama (1444–ca.1510), traveler, interpreter
- Bolesław Gebert, Soviet agent in the United States
- Konstanty Gebert, Polish journalist
- Zofia Gomułkowa, wife of Władysław Gomułka
- Adam Humer, Stalinist official
- Berek Joselewicz, commanded the first Jewish military formation in modern history
- Marion Kozak, political activist and human rights campaigner (Campaign for Nuclear Disarmament, Jews for Justice for Palestinians, Independent Jewish Voices), mother of David and Ed Miliband.
- Meyer Lansky, American organized crime figure
- Sir Hersch Lauterpacht, British judge
- Rosa Luxemburg (1871–1919), Marxist revolutionary
- John Monash, Australian general
- Walenty Potocki, Polish count who converted to Judaism
- Marcel Reich-Ranicki, German literary critic
- Sonia Rykiel, French fashion designer
- Józef Światło, Stalinist interrogator
- Leopold Unger, journalist, columnist, and essayist
- Ben Weider, Canadian businessman
- Joe Weider, Canadian bodybuilder and entrepreneur
- Janusz Weiss, journalist and television personality
- Helena Wolińska-Brus, Stalinist prosecutor, wife of Włodzimierz Brus
- L. L. Zamenhof, physician, inventor, and writer; creator of Esperanto

=== Sovereign Polish Armed Forces ===
- Berek Joselewicz (1764–1809), Polish-Jewish Colonel in the Polish Legions of Napoleon's armies
- Bernard Mond (1887–1957), member of the Austrio—Hungarian Army, 1914–1918; Polish soldier and officer, 1918–1939; sent to POW camp by the Germans; finished his career in the rank of Brigade General and, in command of the 6th Infantry Division (Poland), fought against the Germans in 1939
- Poldek Pfefferberg (1913–2001), Polish soldier in 1939 saved from death by his sergeant major; Holocaust survivor; a man who inspired the book that the film Schindler's List was based on
- Baruch Steinberg (1897–1940), Chief Rabbi of the Polish Armed Forces, murdered by the Soviet NKVD

== Religious figures ==
- Philip Ferdinand, professor of Hebrew
- Christian David Ginsburg (1831–1914), Hebraist, converted to Christianity
- Ridley Haim Herschell (1807–1864), missionary; moved to England

=== Rabbis ===
- Rabbi Jacob ben Wolf Kranz, preacher (meggid) from Dubno
- Rabbi Aaron Hart (1670–1756), rabbi
- Rabbi Elijah Ba'al Shem of Chelm (1550–1583), co-signer of the Agunah laws; chief rabbi of Chelm
- Rabbi Menachem Ziemba, Warsaw Rabbinate
- Rabbi Kalonymus Kalman Shapira
- Rabbi Yitzchak Meir Alter (1798 – March 10, 1866), also known as the Chiddushei HaRim. First Gerrer Rebbe
- Rabbi Yehudah Aryeh Leib Alter (1847–1905), also known as the Sfas Emes. Gerrer Rebbe from 1870 to 1905.
- Rabbi Avraham Mordechai Alter (December 25, 1866 – June 3, 1948), also known as the Imrei Emes. Gerrer Rebbe from 1905 to 1948.
- Rabbi Yisrael Alter (October 12, 1895 – February 20, 1977), also known as the Beis Yisroel. Gerrer Rebbe from 1948 to 1977.
- Rabbi Simchah Bunim Alter (April 6, 1898 – August 6, 1992), also known as the Lev Simcha. Gerrer Rebbe from 1977 to 1992.
- Rabbi Pinchas Menachem Alter (June 9, 1926 – March 7, 1996), also known as the Pnei Menachem. Gerrer Rebbe from 1992 to 1996.
- Rabbi Yaakov Aryeh Alter (b. 1939), Gerrer Rebbe from 1996 to the present
- Rabbi Chanoch Heynekh HaKohen Levin of Aleksander (1798 – March 21, 1870)
- Rabbi Meir Shapiro (March 3, 1887 – October 27, 1933), rabbi of Lublin, founder of Yeshiva Chachmei Lublin, and creator of Daf Yomi

== Academics ==
=== Economists ===
- Włodzimierz Brus
- Roman Frydman
- Henryk Grossman
- Leonid Hurwicz, Nobel Prize winner (2007)
- Michał Kalecki
- Ludwik Landau
- Hilary Minc (1905–1974)
- Paul Rosenstein-Rodan

=== Mathematicians ===
- Nachman Aronszajn
- Herman Auerbach
- Salomon Bochner
- Samuel Dickstein
- Samuel Eilenberg
- Siemion Fajtlowicz
- Salo Finkelstein
- Mark Kac
- Bronisław Knaster
- Włodzimierz Kuperberg
- Kazimierz Kuratowski
- Leon Lichtenstein
- Adolf Lindenbaum
- Szolem Mandelbrojt
- Benoit Mandelbrot
- Edward Marczewski
- Andrzej Mostowski
- Emil Leon Post
- Mojżesz Presburger
- Stanislaw Saks
- Juliusz Schauder
- Hayyim Selig Slonimski
- Hugo Steinhaus
- Alfred Tarski
- Henryk Toruńczyk
- Stanislaw Ulam

=== Philosophers ===
- Henri Bergson
- Alain Finkielkraut
- Jan Hartman
- Morris Lazerowitz
- Casimir Lewy
- Mieczysław Maneli
- Émile Meyerson
- Ralph Miliband
- Adam Schaff

=== Sciences ===
- Zygmunt Bauman, sociologist
- Leslie Brent, immunologist
- Georges Charpak, physicist, Nobel Prize winner (1992)
- Kasimir Fajans, physicist
- Jan T. Gross, (Christian mother, Jewish father) sociologist and historian
- Ludwik Hirszfeld, microbiologist and scientist
- Roald Hoffmann (b. 1937), chemist and writer; Nobel Prize winner (1981)
- Leopold Infeld, physicist
- Hilary Koprowski, immunologist
- Abraham Lempel, computer scientist
- Albert Abraham Michelson (1852–1931), physicist; Nobel Prize winner (1907)
- Itzhak Nener, jurist
- Moshe Prywes (1914–1998), Israeli physician and educator; first President of Ben-Gurion University of the Negev
- Isidor Isaac Rabi, physicist, Nobel Prize winner (1944)
- Ludwik Rajchman, Polish bacteriologist; first Chairman of UNICEF
- Tadeus Reichstein, chemist, Nobel Prize winner (1950)
- Józef Rotblat, physicist, nuclear disarmament activist, Nobel Peace Prize winner (1995)
- Albert Sabin, inventor of the oral polio vaccine
- Paweł Śpiewak, sociologist, historian, politician and director of the Jewish Historical Institute
- Ary Sternfeld, founder of astronautics

== Historians ==
- Szymon Askenazy
- Benzion Netanyahu
- Artur Eisenbach
- Emanuel Ringelblum
- Jacob Talmon (1916–1980), historian; made aliyah to Israel
- Adam Ulam

== Cultural figures ==
=== Artists ===
- Jankel Adler, Polish-Jewish painter
- Adolf Behrman, Polish-Jewish painter
- Henryk Berlewi, Polish-Jewish painter
- Alexander Bogen, painter, sculptor, stage designer, book illustrator and a commander partisan during World War II
- Aniela Cukier, Polish-Jewish painter
- Karl Duldig, Polish-Jewish sculptor
- Jacob Epstein, American-British sculptor
- Samuel Finkelstein, Polish-Jewish oil painter
- Enrico Glicenstein, Polish-Jewish-American sculptor
- Chaim Goldberg, Polish-Jewish artist, painter, sculptor and engraver
- René Goscinny, French comics editor and writer
- Itshak Holtz (1925-2018), painter; immigrated to Israel
- Mayer Kirshenblatt (1916-2009), artist
- Paul Kor, Israeli painter, graphic designer, author and illustrator
- Felix Lembersky (1913-1970), painter and theater stage designer
- Arthur Szyk, book illustrator and political artist
- Feliks Topolski, painter, illustrator, graphic artist
- Alfred Wolmark (1887-1961), painter; immigrated to England
- Maurycy Gottlieb, Polish-Jewish painter and protégé of Jan Matejko

=== Musicians ===
- Arthur Balsam, violinist and pedagogue born in Warsaw and trained in Łódź
- Mike Brant, Israeli pop star; mother was Bronia Rosenberg, originally from Łódź in Poland; father was Fishel Brand, from Biłgoraj in Poland
- Grzegorz Fitelberg, composer and conductor; born in Dvinsk, Latvia
- Jerzy Fitelberg, composer; born in Warsaw, Poland; immigrated to the United States
- Russ Freeman (pianist), bebop jazz pianist and composer; father born in Poland
- Szymon Goldberg, conductor and violinist; born in Włocławek, Congress Poland
- Benny Goodman, band leader; parents born in Poland
- George Henschel (1850-1934), musician; immigrated to England
- Mieczysław Horszowski, pianist, born in Lwow
- Jan Kiepura (1902-1966), actor and singer; immigrated to the United States (Jewish mother)
- Paul Kletzki (1900-1973), composer and conductor
- Slawomir Kowalinski (born 1965), polish pianist and composer
- Wanda Landowska (5 July 1879 - 16 August 1959), harpsichordist
- Geddy Lee vocalist and bassist for Rush (band), (Parents born in Poland)
- Jerzy Petersburski (1895-1979)
- Moriz Rosenthal, pianist, born in Lwow
- Eddie Rosner (26 May 1910 - 8 August 1976)
- Arthur Rubinstein, pianist
- Isaac Stern, violinist
- Henryk Szeryng (1918-1988), violinist; immigrated to Mexico
- Władysław Szpilman, pianist and subject of the Roman Polanski film The Pianist
- Maria Szymanowska, pianist and composer
- Henryk Wars (1902-1977), composer; immigrated to the United States
- Henryk Wieniawski

=== Screen and stage ===
- Feliks Falk (born 1941)
- Aleksander Ford (1908-1980), film director
- Joseph Green (1900-1996), Polish-American film actor and director
- Jerzy Hoffman (born 1932), film director and screenwriter
- Agnieszka Holland (born 1948), film director and writer (Jewish father)
- Boris Kaufman (1887-1980), cinematographer; immigrated to the United States; brother of Mikhail Kaufman and Dziga Vertov
- Mikhail Kaufman (1897-1980), cinematographer and photographer; immigrated to the Soviet Union; brother of Boris Kaufman and Dziga Vertov
- Lydia Kindermann (1892–1953), opera singer, emigrated to Argentina
- Krzysztof Kowalewski (1937-2021), film, television, theatre and radio actor, comedian
- Marcel Łoziński (born 1940)
- Andrzej Munk (1921-1961), film director and screenwriter, one of the creators of the Polish Film School
- Roman Polanski (born 1933), Polish-French film director (Jewish father, half-Jewish mother)
- Marie Rambert (1888-1982), ballet dancer and teacher; immigrated to England
- Piotr Skrzynecki, cabaret director (Jewish mother)
- Jerzy Toeplitz (1909-1995), film educator, director, writer
- Konrad Tom (1887-1957), actor, writer, singer and director working in theater and film
- Dziga Vertov, film director; immigrated to the Soviet Union; brother of Boris Kaufman and Mikhail Kaufman
- Michał Waszyński (1904-1965), film and theater director; film producer
- Michał Znicz, born Michał Feiertag, (1888-1943), stage and film actor

== Writers and poets ==
=== Polish-language ===
- Rokhl Auerbakh, writer and essayist
- Krzysztof Kamil Baczyński
- Roman Brandstaetter, writer and poet
- Kazimierz Brandys (1916-2000), writer
- Marian Brandys, writer and screenwriter
- Jan Brzechwa
- Gusta Dawidson Draenger (1917-1943), journalist, diarist
- Zuzanna Ginczanka
- Agnieszka Graff, writer and feminist
- Marian Hemar
- Janusz Korczak, writer
- Henryka Łazowertówna
- Bolesław Leśmian (1877-1937), poet (Jewish ancestry)
- Teodor Parnicki (1908-1988), writer (Jewish mother)
- Tadeusz Różewicz (Jewish mother)
- Bruno Schulz, writer
- Antoni Slonimski
- Anatol Stern (1899-1968), poet
- Robert Stiller (1928-2016), writer and prolific translator into Polish from English, German and other languages
- Władysław Szlengel
- Włodzimierz Szymanowicz (Jewish father)
- Julian Tuwim (1894-1953), poet
- Leopold Tyrmand (1920-1985), writer
- Aleksander Wat (1900-1967), poet
- Józef Wittlin, poet
- Bogdan-Dawid Wojdowski (1930-1994), writer

=== Yiddish-language ===
- Sholem Asch (1880-1957), novelist and essayist
- Rokhl Auerbakh (1903-1976), writer and essayist
- Isaac ben Saul Chmelniker Candia (fl. 19th-century)
- Solomon Ettinger (1802-1856), playwright and poet
- Isaac Leib Peretz (1852-1915), author and playwright
- Isaac Bashevis Singer (1902-1991), author
- Abraham Sutzkever (1913-2010), poet, immigrated to Israel
- Aleksander Zederbaum (1816-1893), journalist

== Business figures ==
- Arthur Belfer, founder of the Belco Petroleum Corporation
- André Citroën, industrialist, engineer and founder of Citroën
- Max Factor, Sr. (born Maksymilian Faktorowicz), founder of Max Factor & Company; half-brother of Prohibition-era gangster John Factor (born Iakov Faktorowicz)
- Jona Goldrich (born Jona Goldreich), L.A.-based real estate developer
- Samuel Goldwyn (1879-1974; born Szmuel Gelbfisz), founding contributor and executive of several motion picture studios in Hollywood
- Helal Hassenfeld and Henry Hassenfeld, co-founders of Hasbro (originally Hassenfeld Brothers)
- Joanna Hoffman, marketing executive, one of the original members of both the Apple Computer Macintosh team and the NeXT team
- Leopold Julian Kronenberg (1849-1937), banker
- Henry Lowenfeld, impresario, brewer who emigrated to England
- Henry Orenstein (1925-2021), American poker player and entrepreneur
- Samuel Orgelbrand (1810-1896), printer and publisher
- Max Ratner (born Meyer Ratowczer), real estate developer, co-founder of Forest City Enterprises
- Helena Rubinstein (born Chaja Rubinstein), cosmetics entrepreneur, founder and eponym of Helena Rubinstein Incorporated cosmetics company
- Jack Tramiel (1928-2012), businessman and founder of Commodore International
- Warner Bros. (born Wonsal)
  - Albert Warner (1884-1967)
  - Harry Warner (1881-1958)
  - Jack L. Warner (1892-1978)
  - Sam Warner (1887-1927)
- Sam Zell (Shmuel Zielonka), billionaire businessman Equity International, lawyer and philanthropist

== Sports ==
=== Baseball ===
- Moe Drabowsky
- Harry Feldman

=== Chess ===
- Izaak Appel
- Abram Blass
- Moshe Czerniak
- Henryk Friedman
- Paulin Frydman
- Miguel Najdorf
- Dawid Przepiórka
- Gersz Rotlewi
- Akiba Rubinstein
- Gersz Salwe
- Siegbert Tarrasch
- Savielly Tartakower (1887-1956)
- Szymon Winawer
- Daniel Yanofsky
- Johannes Zukertort

=== Fencing ===
- Roman Kantor, épée, Nordic champion and Soviet champion; murdered by the Nazis

=== Football ===
- Ludwik Gintel, Poland national team
- Abraham "Avram" Grant (born 1955), football manager of various football clubs and national teams (e.g. Chelsea F.C., Israel, Ghana national football team)
- Józef Klotz, Poland national team; murdered by the Nazis
- Józef Lustgarten, spent 17 years in the Gulag
- Leon Sperling (1900-1941), left wing, Polish national team; murdered by the Nazis in the Lemberg Ghetto
- Zygmunt Steuermann, centre forward, Polish national team (two matches, four goals); died in December 1941 in the Lemberg Ghetto
- Ben Lederman, American-born, midfield, Raków Częstochowa

=== Professional wrestling ===
- Chris Mordetzky, American professional wrestler, known for his time in World Wrestling Entertainment under the ring name Chris Masters

=== Swimming ===
- Lejzor Ilja Szrajbman, Olympic 4×200-m freestyle relay; murdered by the Nazis in Majdanek concentration camp

=== Track and field ===
- Myer Prinstein, Olympic long-jumper from Szczuczyn, Poland
- Irena Szewińska, sprinter and long jumper; world records in 100-m, 200-m, and 400-m; three-time Olympic champion, plus four medals (for a total of seven Olympic medals)
- Jadwiga Wajs, two world records (discus); Olympic silver and bronze (discus)

=== Weightlifting ===
- Ben Helfgott, Polish-born, three-time British champion (lightweight), three-time Maccabiah champion; survived Buchenwald and Theresienstadt; all but one family member was murdered by the Nazis

== Holocaust survivors ==
- Nelly Ben-Or
- Tauba Biterman
- Zahava Burack
- Yehiel De-Nur
- David Faber
- Leon Feldhendler
- Joseph Friedenson
- Tuviah Friedman
- Roman Frister
- Rena Kornreich Gelissen
- Ben-Zion Gold
- Yekusiel Yehudah Halberstam
- Anna Heilman
- Alicia Appleman-Jurman
- Karolina Jus
- Natalia Karp
- Gerda Weissmann Klein
- Jerzy Kosinski
- Yisrael Lau
- Zvia Lubetkin
- Henryk Mandelbaum
- Jack Mandelbaum
- Kitty Hart-Moxon
- David Olère
- Leopold Pfefferberg
- Philip Riteman
- Josef Rosensaft
- Israel Shahak
- Mike Staner
- Alina Szapocznikow
- Władysław Szpilman
- Emanuel Tanay
- Menachem Mendel Taub
- Charles Thau
- Jack Tramiel
- Ernst Wiechert
- Meir Wilchek

== See also ==
- History of the Jews in Poland
- Israel–Poland relations
- List of Galician Jews
- List of Jews
- List of people from Galicia (modern period)
- List of Poles
