= List of Oceanian Jews =

The vast majority of Jews in Oceania (estimation 120,000) live in Australia, with a population of about 7,000 in New Zealand (6867, according to the 2013 NZ Census). Most are Ashkenazi Jews, with many being survivors of the Holocaust arriving during and after World War II. More recently, a significant number of Jews have arrived from South Africa, Israel, the United Kingdom and Russia. The official number of people who practised Judaism in the 2001 census was only 121,459 but this number is expected to be much higher, as it did not count those overseas (i.e. dual Australian-Israeli nationals) or many non-practicing Jews who prefer not to disclose religion in the census are more common. Since the arrival of the First Fleet in 1788, Australia's Jewish population has hovered around 0.5% of the total counted.

The vast majority of Australia's Jews live in inner suburbs of Melbourne and Sydney with smaller populations, in numerical order, in Perth, Brisbane, the Gold Coast and Adelaide. Currently, there are also recognised communities in Ballarat, Bendigo/Castlemaine, Canberra, Geelong, Gosford, Hobart, Launceston and Newcastle.

In Melbourne, the Jewish population centre is Caulfield where there are streets with nearly a 100% Jewish population; the main areas of settlement spread out from Caulfield in two arcs: south through St Kilda, Elwood, Elsternwick, Brighton, Moorabbin and right down to Frankston; east through Toorak, Malvern, Hawthorn, Kew, Balwyn to Doncaster. In Sydney the major areas of Jewish settlement are in the east and on the North Shore, in particular the suburbs of Bondi, Dover Heights, Rose Bay, Vaucluse, St Ives and Hunters Hill.

In New Zealand, most Jews live in Auckland and Wellington with smaller populations in Dunedin and Christchurch. Dunedin synagogue has possibly the world's southernmost Jewish congregation.

The following is a list of prominent Oceanian Jews, arranged by country of origin.

== Australia ==
=== Academic figures ===
- Roy Clive Abraham, linguist
- Samuel Alexander, philosopher
- Neal Ashkanasy, psychologist and emotional intelligence academic
- Phillip Blashki, successful businessman, magistrate, JP
- Bernard Boas, marriage guidance counsellor, broadcaster, author of biblical treatises
- Ron Castan, barrister and rights advocate
- Sir Zelman Cowen, Governor-General (1977–1982), lawyer, university lecturer (including past appointments as Provost, Dean and Vice-Chancellor)
- Linda Dessau, 29th Governor of Victoria, and former Family Court Judge
- Marcus Einfeld, former Federal Court judge
- Alan Finkel, Australia's Chief Scientist
- Sir Otto Frankel, geneticist
- Bryan Gaensler, astronomer and former Young Australian of the Year
- Fred Hilmer, academic, lawyer and businessman
- David Isaacs, architect and structural engineer, musician and composer
- Phillip Isaacs, architect and structural engineer
- Joseph Jacobs, historian and folklorist
- Stephen Kaye, judge of the Court of Appeal
- William Kaye, judge of the Supreme Court 1972–1991
- Kurt Mahler, mathematician
- Robert Manne, academic and social critic
- Sir Matthew Nathan, British soldier and judge, Governor of Queensland 1920–1925, after also serving as Governor of Sierra Leone, Gold Coast, Hong Kong and Natal; the Brisbane suburbs of Nathan and Nathan Heights are named after him, as is Nathan Street, in the Canberra suburb of Deakin
- Bernhard Neumann, mathematician
- Gustav Nossal, immunologist (Jewish father)
- Robert Richter, barrister and human rights advocate
- Hilary L. Rubinstein, historian
- William D. Rubinstein, historian
- Suzanne Rutland, historian
- Peter Singer, philosopher
- Julius Stone, distinguished legal theorist, professor of jurisprudence and international law
- Mark Tedeschi AM, KC (born 1952), barrister, law professor
- Louis Waller, public teacher of law and law reformer
- James Wolfensohn, World Bank president
- Sir Albert Wolff, Chief Justice of Western Australia
- Ghil'ad Zuckermann, linguist and language revivalist

=== Business figures ===
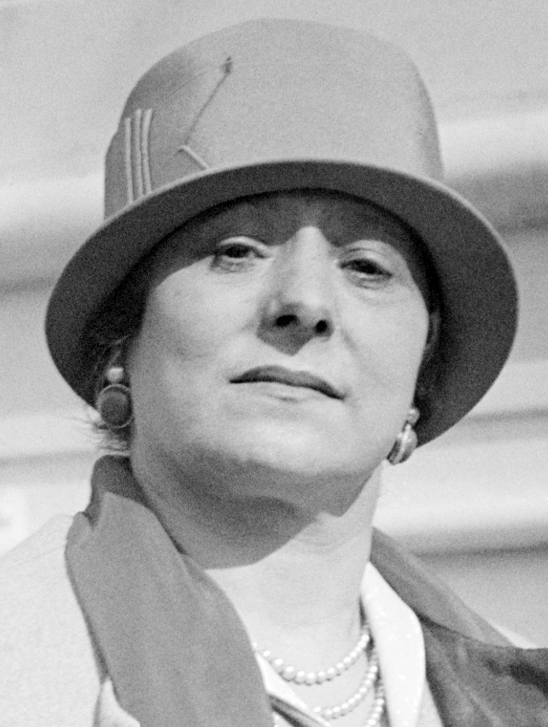
Helena Rubenstein

- Sir Peter Abeles, former chairman of Ansett Transport Industries
- Rodney Adler, CEO of HIH Insurance, convicted criminal
- Peter Alexander, fashion designer
- Albert Bensimon, Adelaide jeweller and businessman
- Harold Boas, architect, Perth councillor, Jewish community worker
- Albert Dadon, businessman
- John Gandel and Marc Besen, founder/owners of Chadstone Shopping Centre and Sussan fashion chain
- David Gonski, public figure and businessman, philanthropist
- Joseph Gutnick, mining magnate and ex-President of Melbourne Football Club
- Poppy King, cosmetician
- Frank Lowy, co-founder of the Westfield Group, philanthropist
- Sidney Myer, founder of Myer department store and philanthropist
- Leon and Richard Pratt, founder/owners of Visy
- Rene Rivkin, stockbroker and convicted insider trader
- Helena Rubinstein, cosmetician (business started in Melbourne), philanthropist, art collector
- Sheree Rubinstein, entrepreneur
- Abe Saffron, nightclub owner, underworld figure
- Joe Saragossi, founder of G.James Glass & Aluminium, glass and window manufacturer
- John Saunders, co-founder of the Westfield Group
- Harry Seidler, architect
- Sidney Sinclair, men's fashion label founder
- Smorgon family, founder/owners of Smorgon Steel and other businesses
- Harry Triguboff, property developer founder of Meriton

=== Cultural figures ===
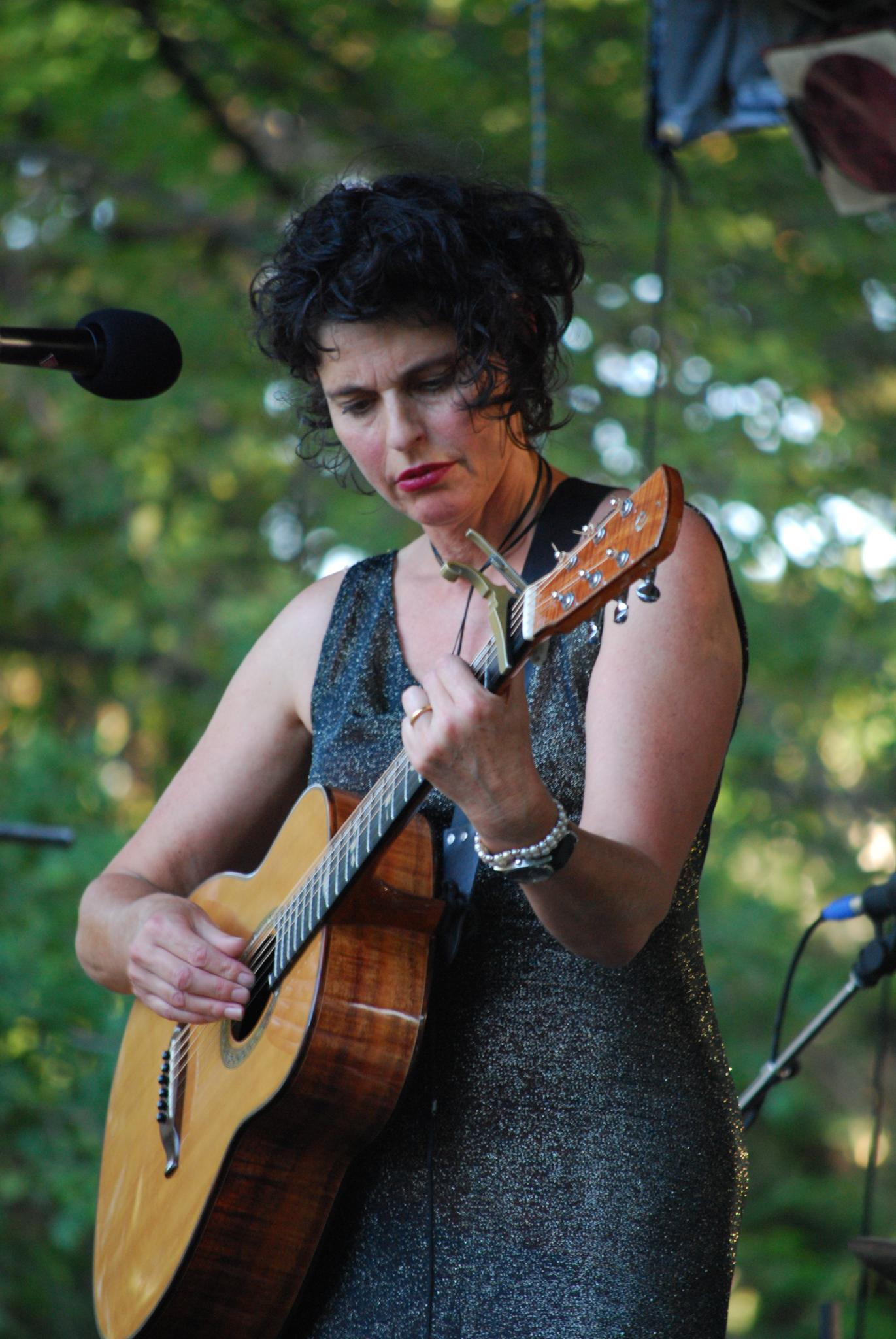
Deborah Conway

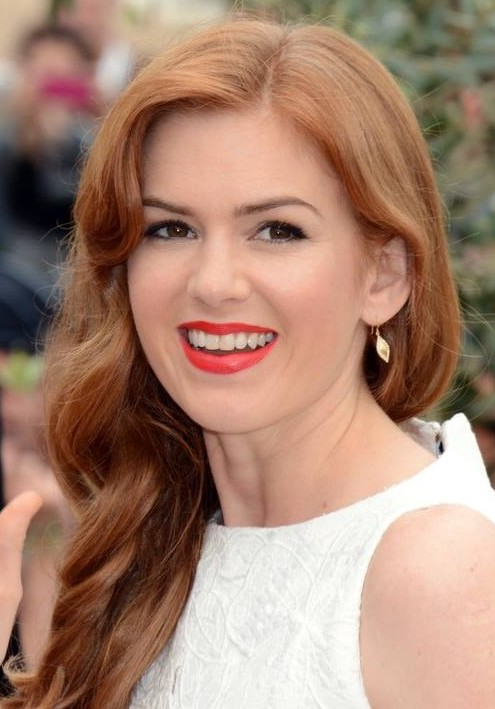
Isla Fisher

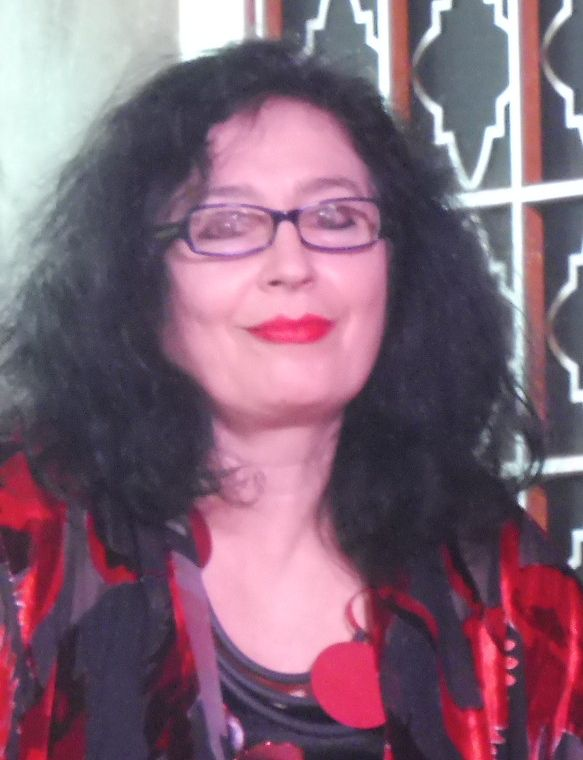
Elena Kats-Chernin

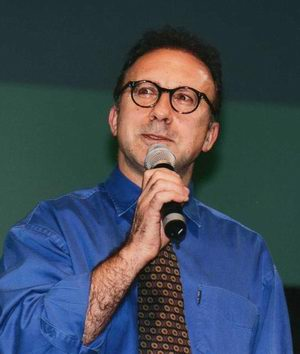
Jack Levi

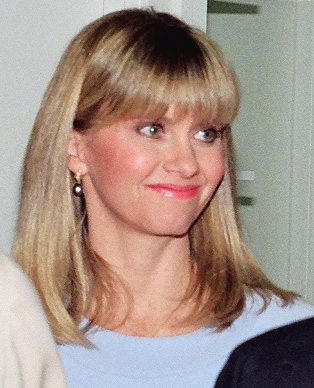
Olivia Newton-John

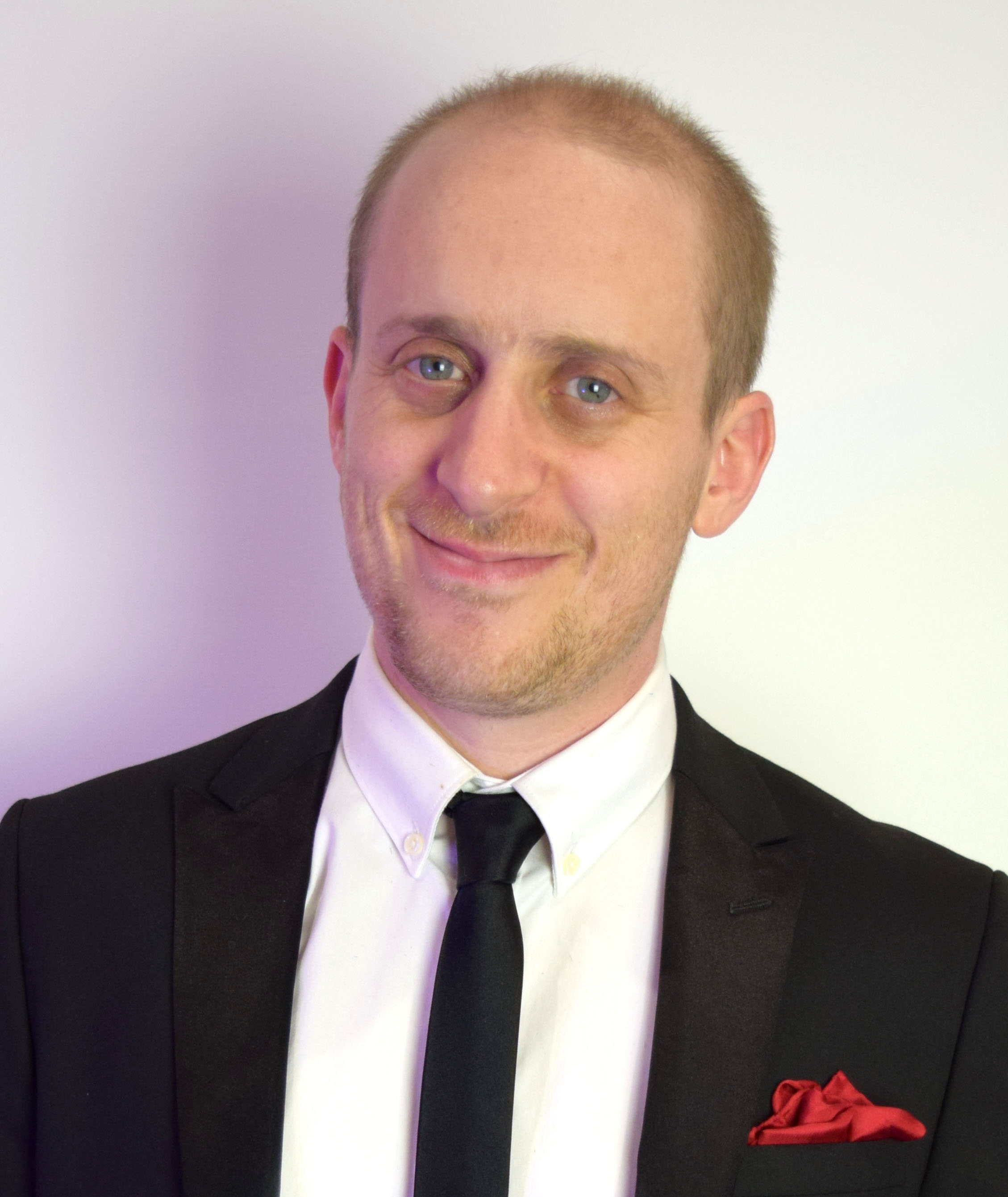
Simon Tedeschi

- Oren Ambarchi, musician
- Louis Abrahams, businessman, artist, and later a patron of the artists of the Heidelberg School
- Jimmy Barnes, Scottish-born musician, born to a Jewish mother but raised Christian
- Eric Baume, broadcaster/journalist
- Arthur Benjamin, composer
- Danny Ben-Moshe, writer
- Rachel Berger, comedian
- John Bluthal, actor
- Lily Brett, writer
- Geraldine Brooks, Pulitzer Prize–winning writer
- Saskia Burmeister, actress
- Judy Cassab, painter
- Deborah Conway, singer-songwriter
- Ed Doolan, Australian-born British broadcaster
- George Dreyfus, composer
- Jon Faine, radio presenter
- Alex Fein, community activist, writer, and businesswoman
- Jack Feldstein, scriptwriter/neon animator
- FourPlay Electric String Quartet (3/4 Jewish)
- Louise Fox, television writer-producer
- Isla Fisher, Omani-born actress
- Tim Freedman, musician
- Amelia Frid, former child actress
- Renée Geyer, soul singer
- Henry Gilbert, actor
- Alan Gold, author
- Libbi Gorr, comedian
- Yoram Gross, producer
- Michael Gudinski, record executive
- Osher Günsberg, television/radio presenter and journalist
- Alexander Gutman (aka Austen Tayshus), comedian
- David Helfgott, pianist
- Elena Kats-Chernin, composer
- Danny Katz, writer/comedian
- Inge King, sculptor
- Steve Kipner, songwriter
- Barrie Kosky, creative director
- Ben Lee, singer-songwriter
- Jack Levi (aka Elliot Goblet), comedian
- Lior Attar (aka Lior), Israeli-born singer-songwriter
- Sam Lipski, newspaper writer and editor, radio and TV broadcaster and commentator, CEO of the philanthropic Pratt Foundation
- Tziporah Malkah (aka Kate Fisher), actress, model
- David Malouf, writer (Jewish mother)
- Miriam Margolyes, actress
- Bill Meyer, artist
- Margaret Michaelis-Sachs, photographer
- Isaac Nathan, Australia's first composer
- Helmut Newton, photographer
- Olivia Newton-John, singer-songwriter, actress
- Eva Orner, film-maker
- Elliot Perlman, writer
- Linda Phillips, composer
- Bram Presser, author and singer for Yidcore
- Ohad Rein, musician
- Lara Sacher, actress
- John Safran, comedian/documentarian
- Hermann Schildberger, choir leader, organist (secular and in synagogues)
- Michael Schildberger, radio and TV broadcaster and commentator
- Athol Shmith, photographer
- Michael Shmith, journalist and music critic
- Cate Shortland, screenwriter and director (convert)
- Larry Sitsky, composer
- Troye Sivan, actor, singer-songwriter
- Nathan Spielvogel, writer, particularly about Jewish life in early Ballarat; lay communal leader of the Ballarat synagogue
- Yael Stone, actor
- Simon Tedeschi, pianist
- Harry van der Sluys (aka Roy Rene and Mo McCackie), music hall, theatrical and radio comedian
- Felix Werder, composer
- Tal Wilkenfeld, musician
- Yitzhak Yedid, composer
- Yidcore's members (Bram, Myki, Tim and Rory), Jewish punk band, from Melbourne, Australia
- Allan Zavod, musician

=== Political figures ===
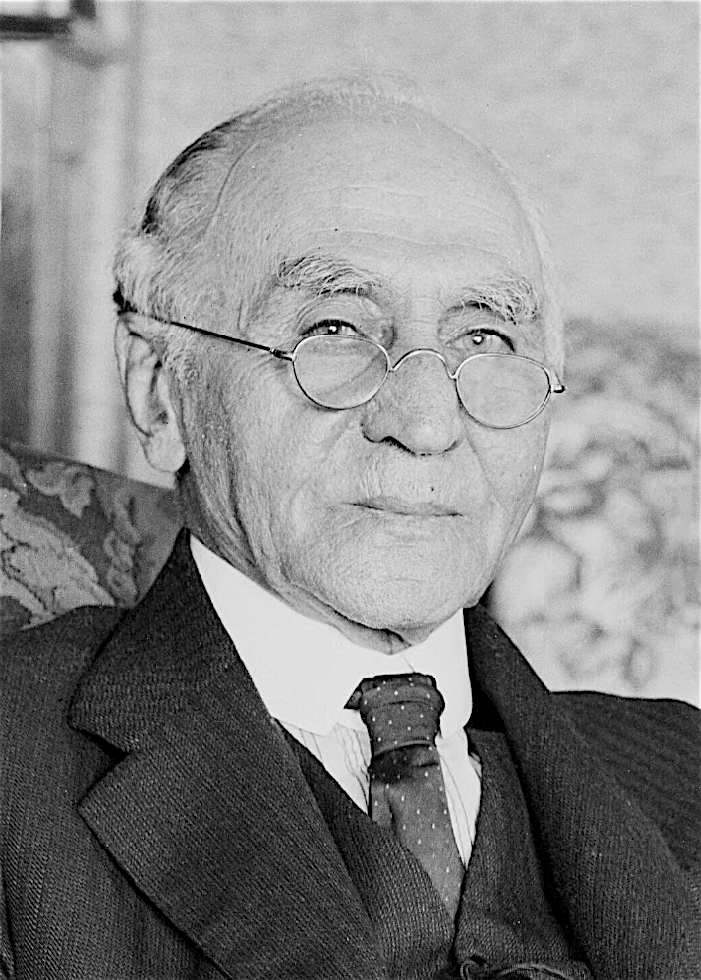
Sir Isaac Isaacs

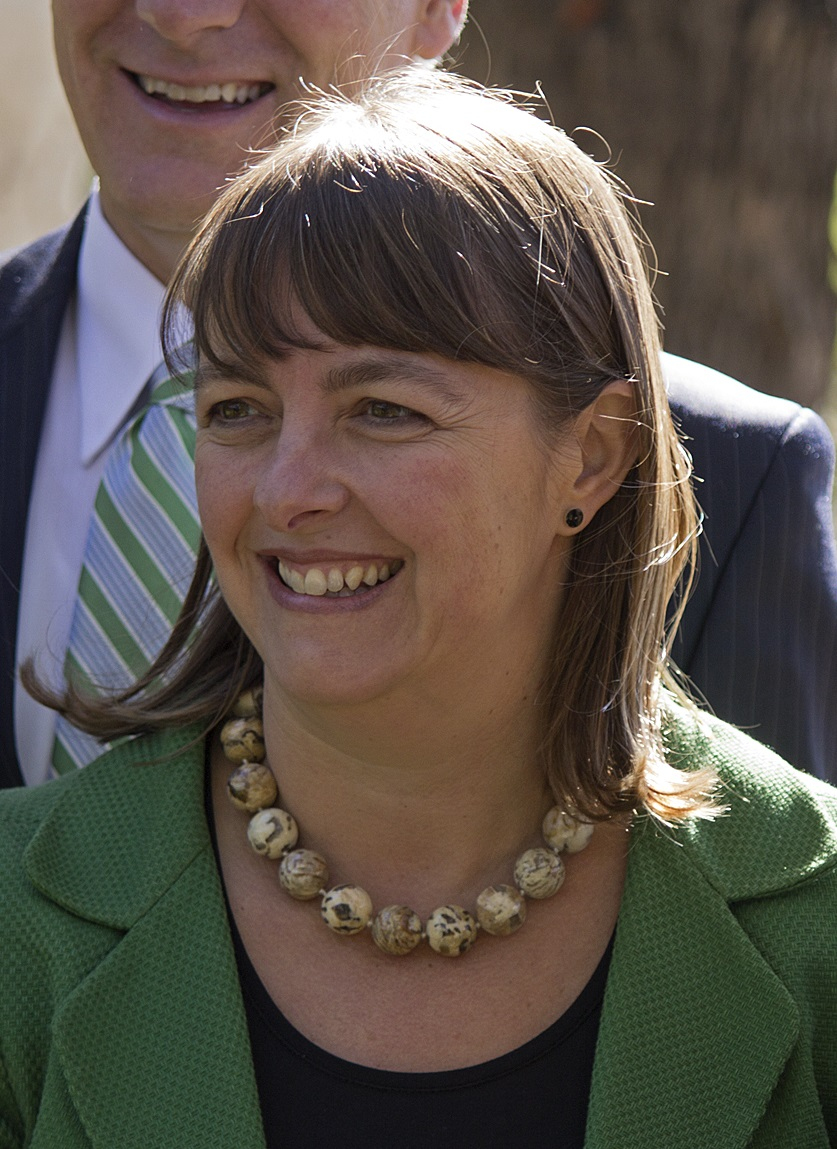
Nicola Roxon

==== National figures ====
- Julian Leeser, Liberal member of the Australian House of Representatives (2016–present)
- Moss Cass, former Labor cabinet minister
- Barry Cohen, Labor government minister in the Federal Parliament (1983–1987)
- Michael Danby, Labor member of the Australian House of Representatives (1998–2019)
- Mark Dreyfus QC, Attorney-General of Australia 2013–2013 Labor member of the Australian House of Representatives (2007–present)
- James Edelman, High Court Justice
- Jason Falinski, Liberal member of the Australian House of Representatives (2016–2022)
- Josh Frydenberg, Liberal member of the Australian House of Representatives (2010–2022), Minister for Environment and Energy 2016–2018, Deputy Leader of the Liberal Party 2018–present.
- Stirling Griff, Centre Alliance, senator for South Australia in the Upper House of Parliament (2016–present)
- Sir Isaac Isaacs, Governor General (1931–1936), prominent solicitor, member of Victorian colonial parliament, one of the drafters of the Australian constitution, member of first Australian parliament, Chief Justice of the High Court
- Josh Burns, Labor member of the House of Representatives (2019–present)
- Mark Regev, Israeli Ambassador in Kensington, London, England (2015–2017)
- Nicola Roxon, Minister for Health and Ageing 2007–2011, Attorney-General of Australia 2011–2013 Labor member of the Australian House of Representatives (1998–2013)
- Elias Solomon, former member of Federal Parliament
- Vaiben Louis Solomon, premier of South Australia and member of the House of Representatives for South Australia

==== Local body politicians ====
- Maurice Ashkanasy, Vice-chairman of Victorian Bar Council and member of Australian Labor party
- Hajnal Ban, politician, author
- Peter Baume, Liberal cabinet minister, chancellor of the Australian National University
- Joe Berinson, Member of Federal Parliament, Minister in Whitlam's third Cabinet, State Upper house member, State Labor cabinet minister and Attorney General of Western Australia
- Ian Cohen, Greens member of the New South Wales Legislative Council (1995–2011)
- Philip Dalidakis, Labor member of the Victorian Legislative Council
- Linda Dessau, Governor of Victoria (from 2015)
- Marcus Einfeld, human rights activist, former Federal Court judge and convicted perjurer
- Sydney Einfeld, New South Wales Minister for Consumer Affairs (1976–1981)
- Vida Goldstein, suffragette
- Jennifer Huppert, Labor member of the Victorian Legislative Council (2009–2010)
- Martin Indyk, United States ambassador to Israel (1995–1997 and 2000–2001)
- Walter Jona, Victorian State Minister
- Dr John Kaye, Greens member of the New South Wales Legislative Council
- Sir Richard Kingsland, Public Servant, RAAF pilot who rescued two senior British WWII leaders in Morocco in 1940
- Paul Landa, solicitor, barrister, N.S.W. Labor politician, and minister in the Wran Government (1976–1984)
- Henry Jacques Ninio, Lord Mayor of Adelaide, co-founder of Progressive Judaism in Adelaide
- Martin Pakula, Labor member of the Victorian Legislative Council, Attorney-General 2014-Since
- Leo Port, Lord Mayor of Sydney (1975–1978)
- Julius Roe, Fair Work Australia Commissioner, former head of Australian Manufacturing Workers Union
- Eric Roozendaal, NSW Labor cabinet minister (2008–2011)
- David Southwick, Liberal Member of the Victorian Legislative Assembly
- James Wolfensohn, World Bank president
- Sir Albert Wolff, Chief Justice of Western Australia

=== Religious figures ===
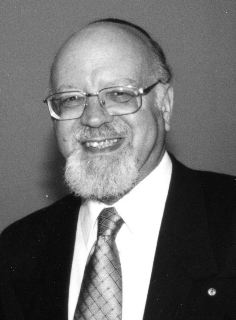
Rabbi Dr Raymond Apple

- Rabbi Dr Joseph Abrahams, prominent Melbourne rabbi of the late 19th and early 20th centuries, was unsuccessful as a candidate in 1911 for the position of Chief Rabbi of Britain and the Commonwealth
- Rabbi Dr Raymond Apple, Senior Rabbi of the Great Synagogue of Sydney, Senior Rabbi to the Australian Defence Force, Registrar of the Sydney Beth Din, author of OzTorah.com, and the leading spokesperson for Jews and Judaism in Australia from 1972 to 2005
- Rabbi Elias Blaubaum, rabbi at St Kilda Hebrew Congregation for 40 years, newspaper editor
- Rabbi Abraham Tobias Boas, rabbi in Adelaide for about 40 years
- Rabbi Rudolph (Rudie) Brasch, senior reform rabbi in Sydney for over 30 years, a well-known author and broadcaster
- Gen. Paul Cullen, founder of Emanuel Synagogue, Sydney, Army General
- Rabbi Francis Cohen, prominent Sydney rabbi in the early 20th century
- Rabbi Jacob Danglow, rabbi at St Kilda Hebrew Congregation 1905–1962, one of the most prominent rabbis in both the Jewish and the general communities
- Rev Alexander Davis, over 30 years as minister of the York Street and Great synagogues
- Rabbi Pinchus Feldman, Rabbi of the Yeshiva Centre
- Rabbi David Freedman, rabbi in Perth for over 40 years
- Rabbi Harry Freedman, rabbi in Sydney and translator for Soncino Press
- Rabbi David Freilich, rabbi in Perth 1988–2012
- Rabbi Ralph Genende, rabbi at Caulfield, and prominent in interfaith dialogue
- Rabbi Lazarus Goldman, rabbi at Toorak Road synagogue, author and historian, died on the bimah in 1960 whilst conducting a Kol Nidre service in Adelaide
- Rabbi Yitzchok Dovid Groner, director of many Chabad operations in Victoria
- Rabbi Chaim Gutnick, formerly rabbi of Elwood Synagogue for over forty years and life president of the Rabbinical Council of Victoria
- Rabbi Mordechai Gutnick, rabbi at Elwood and member of the Beth Din
- Rabbi Sholom Gutnick, rabbi at Caulfield for about 40 years, and Av Beth Din
- Rabbi Philip Heilbrunn, Rabbi Emeritus and long-serving rabbi at St Kilda
- Rabbi John Levi, first Australian-born rabbi, prominent Progressive rabbi, teacher and historian
- Rabbi Ronald Lubofsky, rabbi at St Kilda for over 30 years
- Joseph Marcus, convict who trained as a rabbi and is reputed to have conducted the first Jewish services in Sydney
- Rabbi Jerome Mark, the first Progressive rabbi in Australia
- Rev Joseph Myers, minister in Brisbane for 43 years
- Mrs Ada Phillips, founder of Australia's first permanent Progressive congregation in Melbourne
- Rabbi Israel Porush, prominent and long-serving Sydney rabbi
- Mr Abraham Rabinovitch, philanthropist and founder of Sydney's main Orthodox Jewish educational institutions
- Rev Moses Rintel, first minister of the Melbourne Hebrew Congregation, and later of the East Melbourne Hebrew Congregation
- Rabbi Louis Rubin-Zacks, rabbi in Perth for 25 years
- Rabbi Dr Herman Sanger, important Melbourne progressive rabbi, responsible for the spread of progressive Judaism to other parts of Australia
- Rabbi Max Schenk, first Progressive rabbi in Sydney, early Zionist

=== Sports figures ===
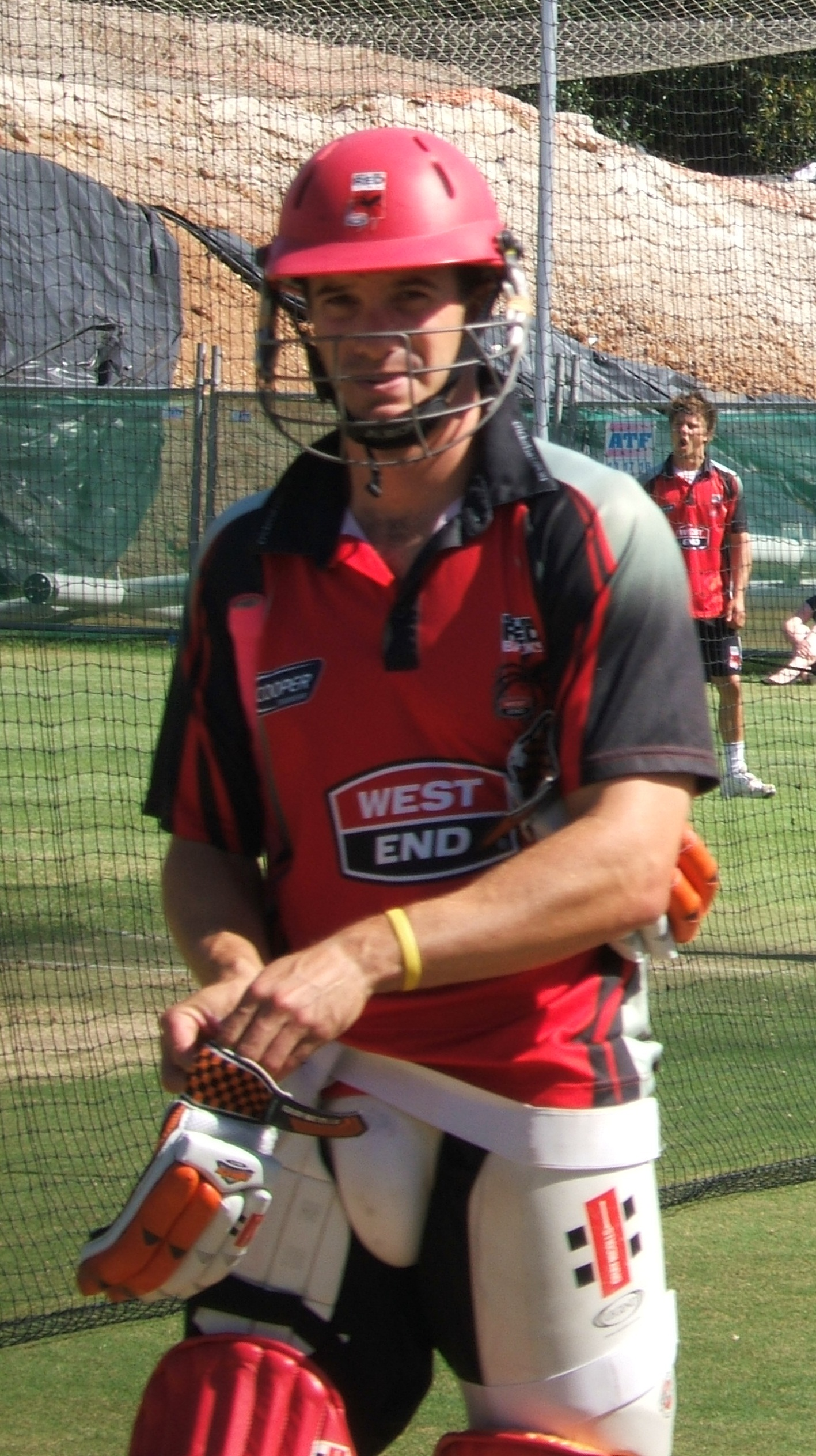
Michael Klinger

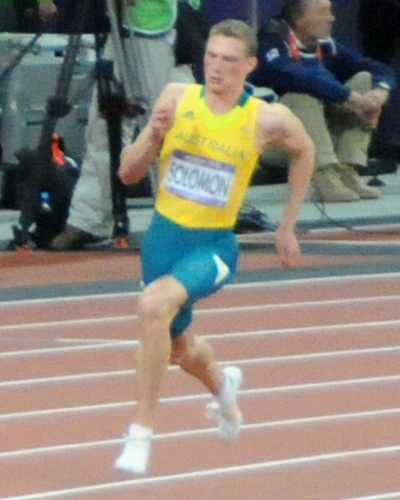
Steven Solomon

- Ben Ashkenazi, cricketer (Victorian Bushrangers)
- Ashley Brown, football (soccer) player Melbourne Victory FC
- Jordan Brown, midfielder (Melbourne Victory)
- David Emanuel, Australian rugby union player
- Gavin Fingleson, South African-born Australian, Olympic silver medalist
- Jessica Fox, French-born Australian 3-times Olympic gold medallist in K-1 and Canoe slalom
- Noemie Fox, Olympic gold medallist in Kayak cross
- Peter Fuzes, soccer goalkeeper for Hakoah and Australia, Maccabi Hall of Fame 2003; played 1st grade 1964 till 1976; international career 1966–72, against Scotland 1967, Greece 1969, Israel 1969 and 1972; played against various European clubsides including AS Roma 1966, Manchester United at the time of Bobby Charlton and Dennis Law
- Jake Girdwood-Reich, footballer for St. Louis City SC and the Olyroos
- Todd Goldstein, Australian rules footballer (Essendon)
- Todd Greenberg, former CEO of the National Rugby League
- David Horwitz, rugby union fly-half / centre, New South Wales Waratahs
- Eban Hyams, India-Israel-Australia, Australian National Basketball League & Israeli Super League 6' 5" guard, first-ever Indian national to play in ULEB competitions
- Tal Karp (born 1981), female Australian football (soccer) player
- Michael Klinger, cricketer; an ex-collegian at Mount Scopus Memorial College
- Gary Lazarus, ARF Fitzroy Lions
- Leonard "Jock" Livingston, cricketer
- Jonathan Moss, former first-class cricketer for the Victoria cricket team (2000–07); played for Australia at the Maccabiah Games in Israel
- Phil Moss, current manager of the Central Coast Mariners in the A-League; former soccer player in the National Soccer League
- Jacob Muir, footballer, Perth Glory
- Ray Phillips, cricketer, NSW and Queensland
- Myer Rosenblum, rugby union player and solicitor, father of Rupert Rosenblum, who notably employed John Howard as an articled clerk
- Rupert Rosenblum, rugby union player and solicitor, son of Myer Rosenblum
- Albert Rosenfeld, rugby league player
- Ian Rubin, Russian-born player for South Sydney Rabbitohs
- Zac Sapsford, footballer for Western Sydney Wanderers
- Geoff Selby, played for St George Dragons, tragically died in car accident in 1989
- Harry Sheezel, Australian rules footballer (North Melbourne)
- Mark Shulman, rugby league player
- Steven Solomon, Olympic sprinter; Maccabiah Games medalist
- Jordan Swibel, footballer, Valour FC
- Ian Synman, Australian Rules footballer with St Kilda 1958–69, notorious for playing in St Kilda's only Premiership (1966) on Yom Kippur
- Lionel Van Praag, speedway champion
- Ivor Warne-Smith, two-time Brownlow medallist
- Julien Wiener, cricketer
- David Zalcberg, Australian Olympic table tennis player; also an ex-collegian at Mount Scopus Memorial College

=== Other figures ===
- Frances Barkman, schoolteacher and charitable worker
- Dunera boys, group of mainly Jewish British detainees who were deported to Australia in horrific circumstances; many of them later becoming prominent Australian citizens
- Esther Johnston, first fleet prisoner
- Solomon Levey, transported convict who later became a successful businessman
- Sir John Monash, World War I general, engineer, first chairman of Victoria's State Electricity Commission
- Lisa Jackson Pulver, first Indigenous Australian to serve as a Synagogue President
- Ikey Solomon, First Fleet prisoner, the person on whom Charles Dickens based the character of Fagin

== Fiji ==
- Alexander Schmerrill Bowman, businessman, early settler
- Sir Henry Marks, businessman, politician

== French Polynesia ==
- Queen Marau
- Alexander Salmon
- Alexander Ariʻipaea Salmon

== Guam ==
- Evan Montvel Cohen, businessman
- Edward D. Taussig, Governor of Guam (1899)

== New Zealand ==
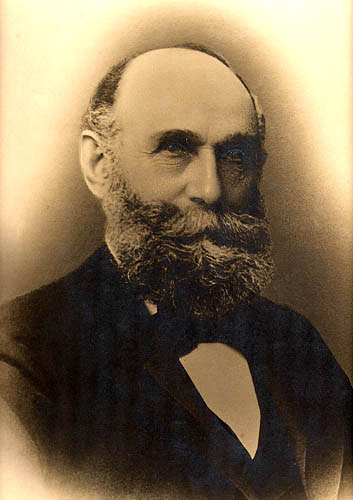
Bendix Hallenstein

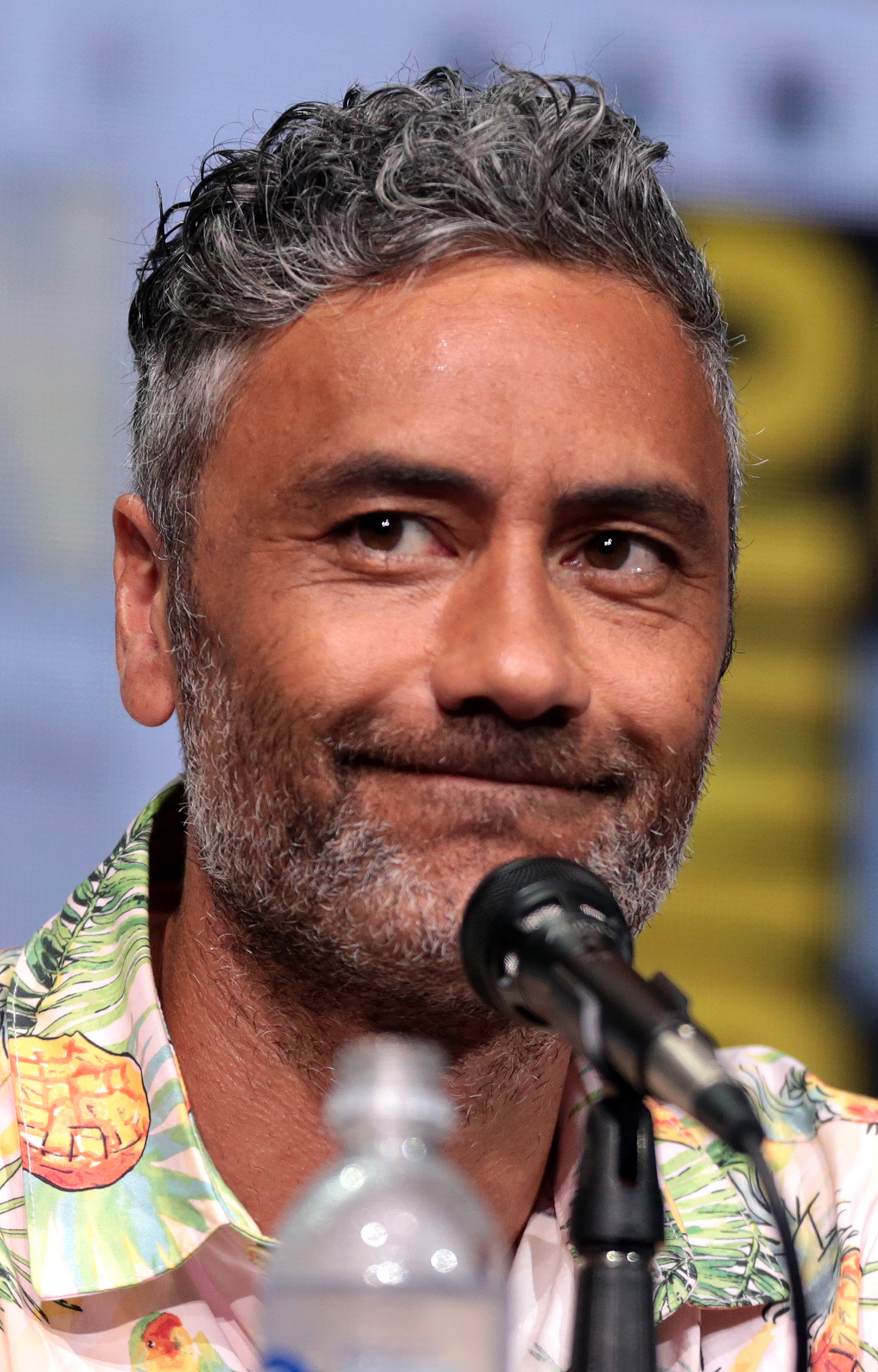
Taika Waititi

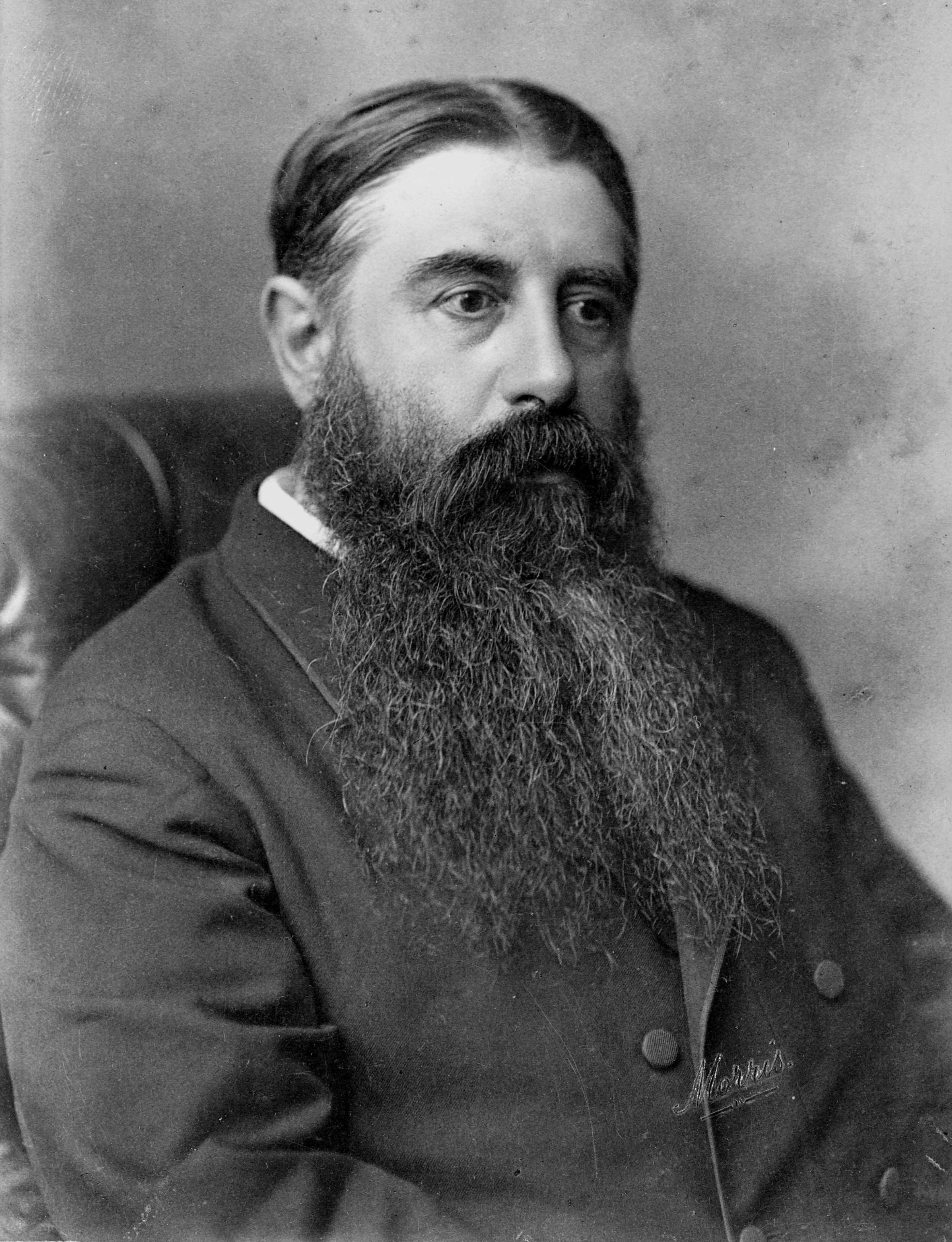
Sir Julius Vogel

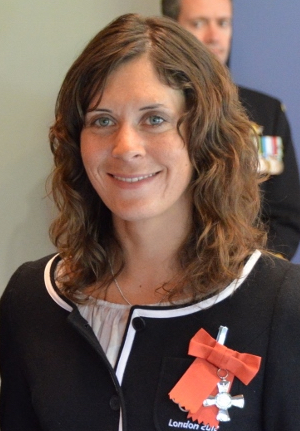
Jo Aleh

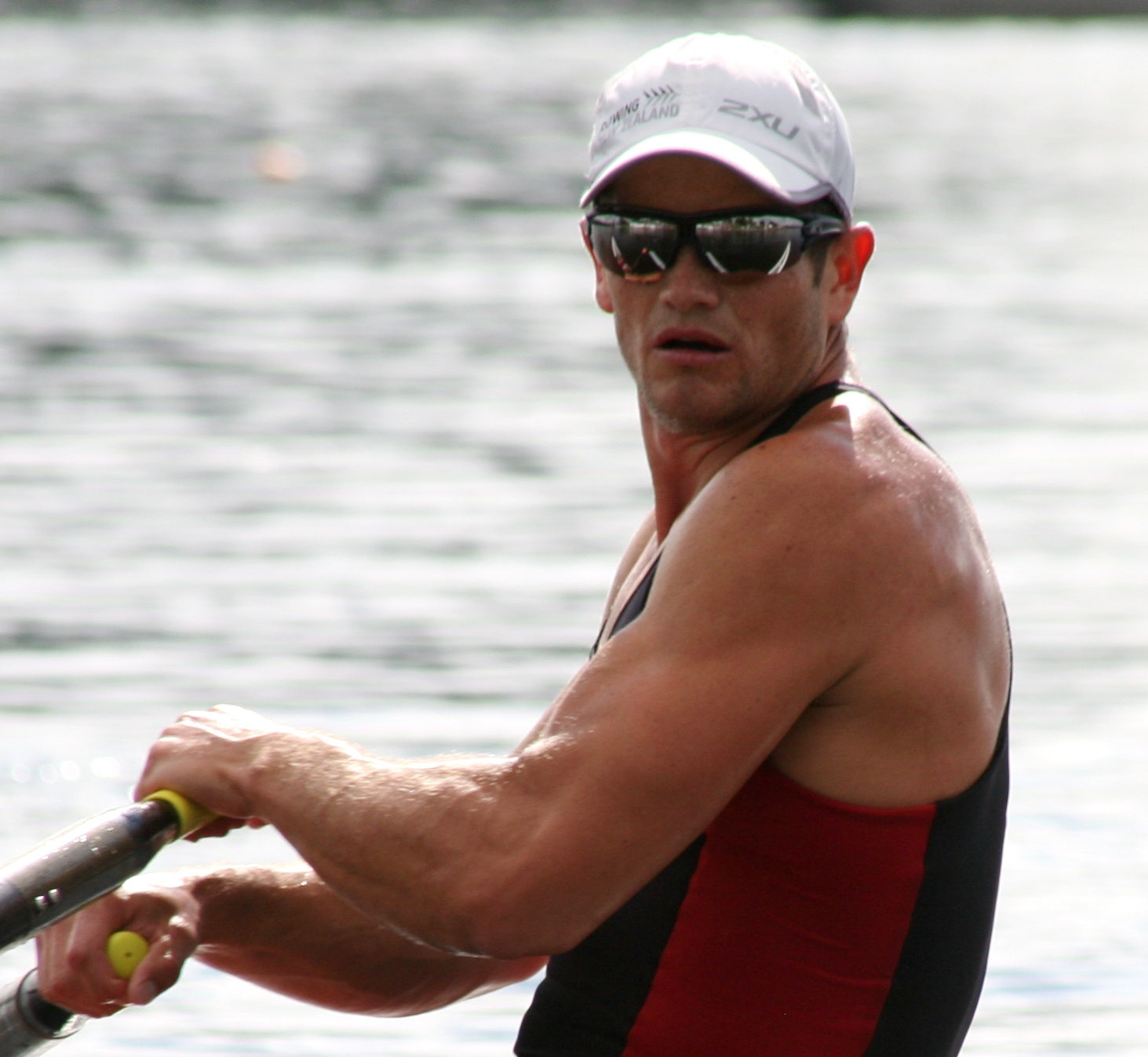
Nathan Cohen

=== Business figures ===
- Sir Woolf Fisher, industrialist
- Bendix Hallenstein, clothing manufacturer and merchant, and MP
- Michael Hirschfeld, businessman, activist and Labour Party president
- Maurice Joel, brewer and philanthropist (father of Grace Joel, qv)
- Nathaniel William Levin, businessman, father of:
  - William Levin, businessman, benefactor
- John Israel Montefiore, trader, merchant, later involved in civic affairs
- David Nathan, retailer
- Joseph Nathan, founder of GlaxoSmithKline
- Sara Tetro, entrepreneur, television personality, and model

=== Cultural figures ===
- Esmond de Beer, historian, collector, philanthropist
- Gina Bellman, actress
- Charles Brasch, poet, literature patron
- Angela D'Audney, television anchor
- Benjamin Farjeon, writer
- Willi Fels, philanthropist and collector
- Deb Filler, writer, comic actor
- Marti Friedlander, photographer
- Richard Fuchs, composer and architect
- Joseph Herscher, YouTube personality
- Grace Joel, artist
- Emma Lahana, actress
- Jeffrey Moussaieff Masson, author
- Taika Waititi, film director, writer, painter, comedian and actor

=== Political figures ===
==== National figures ====
- Frederick Baume, Member of Parliament
- Sir Francis Henry Dillon Bell, Prime Minister (1925) (Jewish mother)
- Sir Tom Eichelbaum, Chief Justice (1989–1999)
- Eddie Isbey, (1917-1995), New Zealand Labour Party MP from 1969 to 1987
- Sir John Key (born 1961), Prime Minister (2008–2016) (Jewish mother)
- Sir Michael Myers, chief justice (1929–1946)
- Frederick Pirani, politician
- Samuel Shrimski, Member of Parliament
- Sir Julius Vogel, Prime Minister (1873–1875, 1876), newspaper founder, and science-fiction writer

==== Local body politicians ====
- Mayors
  - Ashburton: Hugo Friedlander (1879–1881, 1890–1892, 1898–1901)
  - Auckland: Philip Philips (Auckland's first mayor, 1871–1874), Henry Isaacs (1874), Sir Arthur Myers (1905–08), Sir Ernest Davis (1935–1941), Sir Dove-Myer Robinson (1959–1965, 1968–1980), and Colin Kay (1980–1983)
  - Christchurch: Charles Louisson (1888–1889, 1898–1899)
  - Invercargill: Abraham Wachner (1942–1950), Eve Poole (1983–1992)
  - Palmerston North: Solomon Abrahams (1887–1889)
  - Wellington: Ian Lawrence (1986–1989), Mark Blumsky (1995–2001)
- Other
  - Dame Barbara Goodman, Auckland local body politician
  - Saul Goldsmith, merchant and local body politician

=== Religious figures ===
- Rabbi Herman van Staveren (1849–1930), rabbi of the Wellington Hebrew Congregation and senior NZ rabbi, 1877–1930
- Rabbi Samuel Goldstein (1852–1935), rabbi of the Auckland Hebrew Congregation for 54 years, 1880–1934
- Rabbi Alexander Astor (1900–1988), rabbi of the Auckland Hebrew Congregation, 1934–71

=== Sports figures ===
- Jo Aleh (born 1986), sailor, national champion, world champion, and Olympic champion
- Nathan Cohen, Olympic champion and world champion rower
- Josh Kronfeld, rugby player

=== Other figures ===
- Lev Aptekar, chess master
- Sir Louis Barnett, surgeon
- Ethel Benjamin, first woman lawyer in the British Empire
- Solomon Faine, microbiologist
- Erich Geiringer, lecturer and political/social campaigner
- Sir Peter Gluckman, science adviser
- Wally Hirsch, former Race Relations Conciliator
- Pei Te Hurinui Jones, Ngati Maniapoto leader and scholar (Jewish father)
- Leopold Kirschner, microbiologist
- Joel Samuel Polack, pioneer settler, author
- Phineas Selig, journalist, newspaper editor, president of the Christchurch Jewish congregation
- Mark Woolf Silverstone, socialist, local body politician, financier

== Palau ==
- Stuart Beck, diplomat

== Samoa ==
- Taito Phillip Field, New Zealand politician born in Samoa

== See also ==
- Lists of Jews
- History of the Jews in Australia
- History of the Jews in New Zealand
