= Louis Joel =

New Zealand cricketer and businessman

Personal information
- Full name: Louis Joseph Joel
- Born: 12 September 1864; Dunedin, Otago, New Zealand
- Died: 6 May 1949 (aged 84); Dunedin, Otago, New Zealand
- Relatives: Maurice Joel (father); Grace Joel (sister)

Domestic team information
- Years: Team
- 1899/00: Otago
- Only FC: 23 December 1899 Otago v Auckland
- Source: CricketArchive, 18 July 2023

Louis Joseph Joel (12 September 1864 – 6 May 1949) was a New Zealand cricketer who played for Otago. He was a prominent businessman in Dunedin.

== Cricket ==
Lou Joel was born in Dunedin and was educated there at Otago Boys' High School. He made a single first-class appearance for Otago, during the 1899–1900 season, against Auckland at the Auckland Domain. Jack Harkness had been named in the side but was injured in an accident, and Joel, who was in Auckland on business, filled the gap on the second day of the match as a full substitute after Otago had batted one short in the first innings. In his only innings, batting at number 11, he scored 1 not out.

Joel was a stalwart of the Albion Cricket Club in Dunedin, playing for it for more than 25 years, including 10 years as captain of the First XI. He also supported it financially, and was largely responsible for its survival through some lean years. He later served on the Otago Cricket Association, including some time as president, and stood as a first-class umpire. In 1926 he was one of nine directors of a company formed to finance the New Zealand team's first tour of England in 1927.

== Family and business ==
Joel's father was the prominent Otago brewer and businessman Maurice Joel who had been born in England in 1829; his mother, Kate Woolf, had been born at Cape Town in Cape Colony. One of his sisters was the notable artist Grace Joel, and the other was the pianist Blanche Levi. Louis Joel married Lily Miller in October 1910.

Joel managed his father's Red Lion brewery before going into a partnership in a jewellery business. Later he co-founded a construction business with the McLellan brothers (William, James, and Duncan), which became one of Dunedin's most successful companies. It was involved in the construction of many major civic structures in Otago and Southland, among them King Edward Technical College, Dunedin's St Paul's Cathedral, the Physics block of the University of Otago, and the former Southland Hospital in Invercargill.

Joel died in Dunedin in May 1949 aged 84, leaving a widow, a daughter and four sons. At the time he was the oldest member of Dunedin's Jewish community.
