= Australian Aluminium Council =

Industry association

The Australian Aluminium Council is the Australian peak industry association representing companies involved in bauxite mining, alumina refining, Production of High Purity Alumina (HPA), aluminium metal production and the production and distribution of semi-fabricated aluminium products.

Marghanita Johnson has been the CEO of the Australian Aluminium Council since 2020.

== Membership ==
Council members include some of Australia's largest companies, and currently are Abx Group, Alpha HPA, Alcoa, Alspec, Aurukun Bauxite, Bluescope Distribution, Capral Aluminium, GJames, Metro Mining, Portland Aluminium, Queensland Alumina Ltd, Rio Tinto Aluminium, South32, Tomago Aluminium, VBX and Vulcan Aluminium.

Australia is one of the world's largest producers of Bauxite, the second largest producer and the world’s largest exporter of alumina and the world's sixth largest producer of aluminium. The Australian aluminium industry employs around 17,000 workers directly and generates export earnings worth over $15 billion.

== Role of the Council ==
The Council is the peak industry association representing the Australian Aluminium industry. The Council promotes the use of Australian aluminium products nationally and internationally. A technical standards group within the Council also develops and maintains material specifications and standards and other technical data for those users both within and outside the industry, and the Council produces an annual statistical analysis of materials consumption, aluminium production and exports by Australia's six aluminium smelters.

== See also ==
- Mining in Australia
