= OBK (disambiguation) =

OBK may refer to:

- OBK, a Spanish synthpop music group
- obk, the ISO 639 code for Bontoc language
- !OBK, the 1988 album by KBO!
- Our Big Kitchen, a charity based in Sydney
- Oberbergischer Kreis, a district in the state of North Rhine-Westphalia, Germany

== See also ==
- Lunden ÖBK, a Swedish football club
