= Cheryl Bart =

Australian lawyer and company director

Cheryl Sarah Bart
- Education: University of New South Wales
- Occupations: Lawyer, business executive
- Known for: First Australian female to complete the Explorer's Grand Slam

Cheryl Sarah Bart AO is an Australian lawyer and company director. She is also the first Australian female and the 31st person worldwide to complete the Explorer's Grand Slam.

== Early life and education ==
Cheryl Sarah Bart is the daughter of Emeric Klinghoffer, a Hungarian concentration camp survivor, and a Polish mother.

She was educated at Moriah College in Sydney, and graduated from the University of New South Wales with degrees in commerce and law.

== Career ==
Bart began her career as a banking and finance lawyer at Mallesons Stephen Jaques.

On 3 June 2010, she commenced a five-year term on the board of the Australian Broadcasting Corporation.

She has been chair of the Foundation for Alcohol Research and Education (FARE), ANZ Trustees Limited, the South Australian Film Corporation, the Adelaide Film Festival, and the South Australian Environment Protection Authority. She has served as a non-executive director on numerous company boards including: Spark Infrastructure Limited, ETSA Utitilies, Shaw of Australia, Audio Pixels Limited, and the Buckland Foundation.

She serves or has served as non-executive director on the boards of ME Bank, Football Australia, the Prince's Trust Australia, Invictus Games Sydney 2018, Moriah Foundation, and TEDxSydney.

== Other roles and memberships ==
She has been an ambassador for the Australian Himalayan Foundation and patron of Sports Connect, and is a member of Chief Executive Women.

== Honours ==
On 26 January 2009, Bart was appointed an Officer of the Order of Australia in the Australia Day Honours.

Bart is the first Australian female and the 31st person worldwide to complete the Explorer's Grand Slam. Namely, the Seven Summits plus skiing, unsupported, to the North Pole and the South Pole. She completed the North Pole on 22 April 2013.

== Family ==
Cheryl Bart is married to Fred Bart, also a company director, and has two children.

On 23 May 2008, Bart and her 23-year-old daughter Nikki became the first mother-daughter team to reach the summit of Mount Everest. The scaling of Everest also saw them complete the "Seven Summits" challenge: climbing the highest mountains in each continent.
