= Pinchus Feldman =

Australian rabbi

Rabbi Pinchus Feldman OAM (born 1944) is the first Chabad shaliach ("emissary") of the Chabad-Lubavitch Hasidic movement in New South Wales, Australia.

== Biography ==
Feldman is the son of Rabbi and Rebbetzin Menachem Mendel Feldman, the longtime rabbi of Congregation Shearis Yisroel, Baltimore, Maryland. In 1964, he was sent as a shliach by Rabbi Menachem Mendel Schneerson to New South Wales, Australia, where he married Pnina Gutnick, the daughter of Rabbi Chaim Gutnick. He is the brother-in-law of commodities magnate Joseph Gutnick and rabbis Mordechai and Moshe Gutnick.

In 1968, Rabbi Schneerson encouraged him to accept the leadership of Yeshiva Centre. The Lubavicher Rebbe sent a letter to the congregation saying, "you are fortunate to have chosen Rabbi Pinchus to serve as the rav and rosh yeshiva of your community, for he is from among the finest students of Tomchei Temimim Lubavitch,” (Igros Kodesh vol. 25 pg. 236).

Under Feldman's leadership the Yeshiva built a number of institutions, including a primary school, separate boys and girls high schools, kindergartens, Rabbinical Colleges, Chabad Houses, and a range of educational, religious, welfare, and support services.

Feldman has been praised by a number of public figures including Kevin Rudd, who praised his "leadership and dedication for more than 40 years in Sydney had a profound impact on not only the Jewish community but on the wider Sydney community".

In 1995, Feldman received the Community service award from Premier John Fahey, for outstanding community services.

In 2002, he received the Medal of the Order of Australia, for service to the Jewish community of New South Wales, particularly through the development of spiritual, educational and welfare facilities. in 2006 the Rabbinic Council of NSW bestowed the honour of honorary life president, "in recognition of his success in raising up many disciples (Avot 1,1) and in spear heading ongoing outreach work in the wider Jewish community in Sydney as the head emissary of the Lubavitcher Rebbe in Sydney.

In 2008, Feldman was honoured by the Organisation of Rabbis of Australia (ORA), as the longest serving communal rabbi in Australia. He was given the title 'Patron of ORA'.

== Royal Commission ==
In February 2015, Feldman gave testimony before the Royal Commission into Institutional Responses to Child Sexual Abuse. The hearing was focused on Chabad Institutions in Australia, which had been widely accused of tolerating and covering up child sexual abuse.

=== Witness testimony ===
During his testimony, Feldman said that in the review of their child protection policy that no one had come forward with any allegations against the Yeshiva Centre, though it later emerged that there had been number of instances where children had come forward to report abuse and nothing was done about the cases.

One such instance, a girl was sent to live with an alleged abuser by the rabbinic leadership shortly after it had been revealed that he abused several young boys. The girl involved alleged that the abuser, Daniel Hayman, would walk around the house naked and behave inappropriately around her. When the boy in that case reported the incidents to the leadership of the centre he was told "I do not believe you, you made it all up".

In another instance it was alleged that Feldman told an abuse victim "it shouldn't happen, and [you the victim] should take steps to avoid it".

Feldman claimed that there were no victims in the Yeshiva centre. When challenged by lawyers who said they were aware of 6 cases, Feldman dismissed them as "hearsay".

Feldman responded that the allegations were false and that my consistent position throughout nearly five decades of spiritual leadership of Yeshiva has always been to refer cases of abuse to the appropriate authorities.

Feldman and the Yeshiva centre reviewed their child protection policies in 2011, but the Royal Commission called them "unclear". When Feldman was quizzed about the details, he was unaware of the details of the policy and when challenged he agreed that he had "completely dropped the ball".

Elsewhere in his testimony Feldman stated that he did not tell police he knew an alleged child sexual abuser was planning to leave the country because he “did not know there was any such obligation". Feldman told the commission the Jewish rules regarding of mesirah, which prohibit Jews from informing on other Jews to civil authorities did not apply in Australia, a democratic country.

Feldman said in his testimony that “It breaks my heart to hear of the suffering that victims of abuse and their families have endured. No one should ever have to suffer in any way, shape or form, particularly children, the most treasured members of our society and the ones who need our protection most.” And he continued, “we give you our solemn commitment that absolutely everything in our power is being done and will continue to be done to ensure that others don't ever go through the same suffering.” Concluding that, “In my decades of leading Yeshiva in Sydney, whenever such matters have arisen and allegations of any form of abuse have come to my attention, I have always counselled to involve the appropriate Government authorities. This has happened on a number of occasions including quite a few incidents where we called the Police ourselves, and to this day there are Police records of those instances.“

=== Response ===
Following the report from the Royal Commission, Feldman rejected calls for him to step down from any of his communal positions. Through a statement from his lawyer he claimed he "has not been the subject of even the slightest negative finding by the Royal Commission of impropriety or misbehaviour in personal, official or public office" and that finding is a "badge of honour", although the general impression of his testimony was negative. The chair of Tzedek, an organisation dedicated to justice for abuse survivors, Manny Waks personally disagreed and called on Feldman to resign immediately.

The Australian Jewish News called the revelations at the Royal Commission at the Sydney and Melbourne Yeshiva centres "Our darkest week" as a community.

Manny Waks, questioned Feldman's sincerity in his testimony, and also questioned Feldman's sincerity in calling on victims not to go to the secular authorities.

== Other legal issues ==
Feldman has faced significant legal trouble, some to do with his financial management of the Yeshiva Centre.

=== 1980s ===
Rabbi Feldmans management was done at the inspiration of the Lubavitcher Rebbe, when 1980s, the institutions were in significant financial difficulties, during a private audience with one of the philanthropists the Rebbe was asked for a special blessing regarding the financial situation. The Rebbe said, “Please tell Rabbi Feldman that the solution to financial problems is to increase in students.” Immediately a campaign was made to bring in more students. Flyers were sent out and advertisements were put in the papers, and pulled in several new students. At the next yechidus, he told the Rebbe that we had brought in new students, but the situation was still dire. The Rebbe responded, “Please explain to Rabbi Feldman that the only solution is to add in students…” At that time asked the Rebbe whether I should borrow money to pay the teachers even though I didn't know how I was going to pay back. The Rebbe answered in the affirmative."

=== 2000s ===
In 2003, the centre faced closure with massive debts, when several donors and parents stepped in to save the Yeshiva School, which was renamed Keser Torah College (KTC). The school was sold to the new group and Feldman no longer had an interest in it. In 2011 the Feldman returned to court to fight a $500,000 tax bill from the sale of the school in 2003.

The dispute between Yeshiva and KTC was finally resolved and a settlement reached whereby Feldman would not open a rival educational facility for 18 months to allow the school to establish itself, however Feldman was later taken to court for breaching the terms of the settlement, eventually legal proceedings in the Supreme Court of NSW were dismissed upon the request of both parties saying "the parties have agreed to leave all outstanding grievances in the past and to move forward in a spirit of friendship".

Eventually the Yeshiva Centre itself was purchased by businessman Harry Triguboff, in order to save it from closure, and to cover the centres debts.

=== 2010s ===
In 2017, Triguboff demanded that Feldman vacate the premises in order to install Dovid Slavin as the head rabbi of the centre. Feldman took Triguboff to court to prevent this, but judge decided in Triguboff's favour, and Feldman was forced to leave the premises.

Following the notice to vacate, Feldman's son, Yossi sent a letter to Triguboff calling him "the first Jew to close a shul since the Nazis", and threatened to remove all their property including Sefer Torahs, and books so they would be unable to function as a synagogue. Feldman eventually distanced himself from his son's letter almost four weeks later.

Feldman was also sued by Shabsi Tayar, who claimed that Feldman had not repaid a $1 million loan, and failed to pay him over a considerable time. The courts decided against Feldman and ordered him to pay $1.6 million to Tayar. The matter was brought to the Supreme court and is currently under appeal.
