= Nikki Bart =

Australian mountain climber and academic

- Education: University of New South Wales
- Occupations: Physician, mountaineer

Nikki (Nicole) Bart is an Australian mountaineer and medical doctor with a specialist interest in hypoxia secondary to high altitude. She and her mother, Cheryl Bart, were the first mother-daughter team to summit Mount Everest and complete the Seven Summits.

== Early life and education ==
Bart was raised in the Eastern Suburbs of Sydney and attended Moriah College. She went on to complete a Bachelor of Medicine, Bachelor of Surgery with honours at the University of New South Wales (UNSW).

== Career ==
Nikki Bart and her mother Cheryl Bart completed the Seven Summits challenge—climbing the highest mountains on each continent—over eight years. From 2001 to 2008, mother and daughter successfully climbed Mount Elbrus (Russia), Denali (United States), Kilimanjaro (Tanzania), Aconcagua (Argentina), Vinson Massif (Antarctica), and Mount Kosciuszko (Australia). In May 2008, when they reached the summit of Mount Everest (Nepal), they became the first mother-daughter duo to have done so. Their Everest ascent also marked their completion of the Seven Summits, also making them the first mother and daughter to have completed the challenge. At the time, Nikki was in her sixth and final year of studying medicine. In 2008, Nikki and Cheryl Bart were jointly awarded the Australian Geographic Spirit of Adventure Award.

In 2011, Bart skied to the North Pole and has plans to ski to the South Pole to complete the Explorers Grand Slam challenge.

Having completed a M.B., B.S.(Hons.) at the University of New South Wales, Bart completed medical registrar and cardiology training at St Vincent's Hospital. She currently works as a heart-failure and transplant cardiologist and scientist, with special interests in advanced cardiac imaging, pulmonary hypertension, and cardiac genetics, at the Victor Chang Cardiac Research Institute.

Bart is a conjoint associate lecturer at UNSW and the University of Notre Dame in medicine. Bart is the recipient of a 2010 John Monash Scholarship and used her scholarship to complete research on hypoxia at the University of Oxford while working as a physician at John Radcliffe Hospital. She also received teaching awards from Green Templeton College at Oxford University.

In 2013, she received an Avant scholarship which allowed her to continue her research in Australia, where she worked in the area of heart failure cardiology as a clinician-scientist. She is also a guest lecturer for the Harvard Extension School and for the Australian College of Sports Physicians.
