= Eyal Boers =

Israeli film director, producer and researcher

- אייל בורס
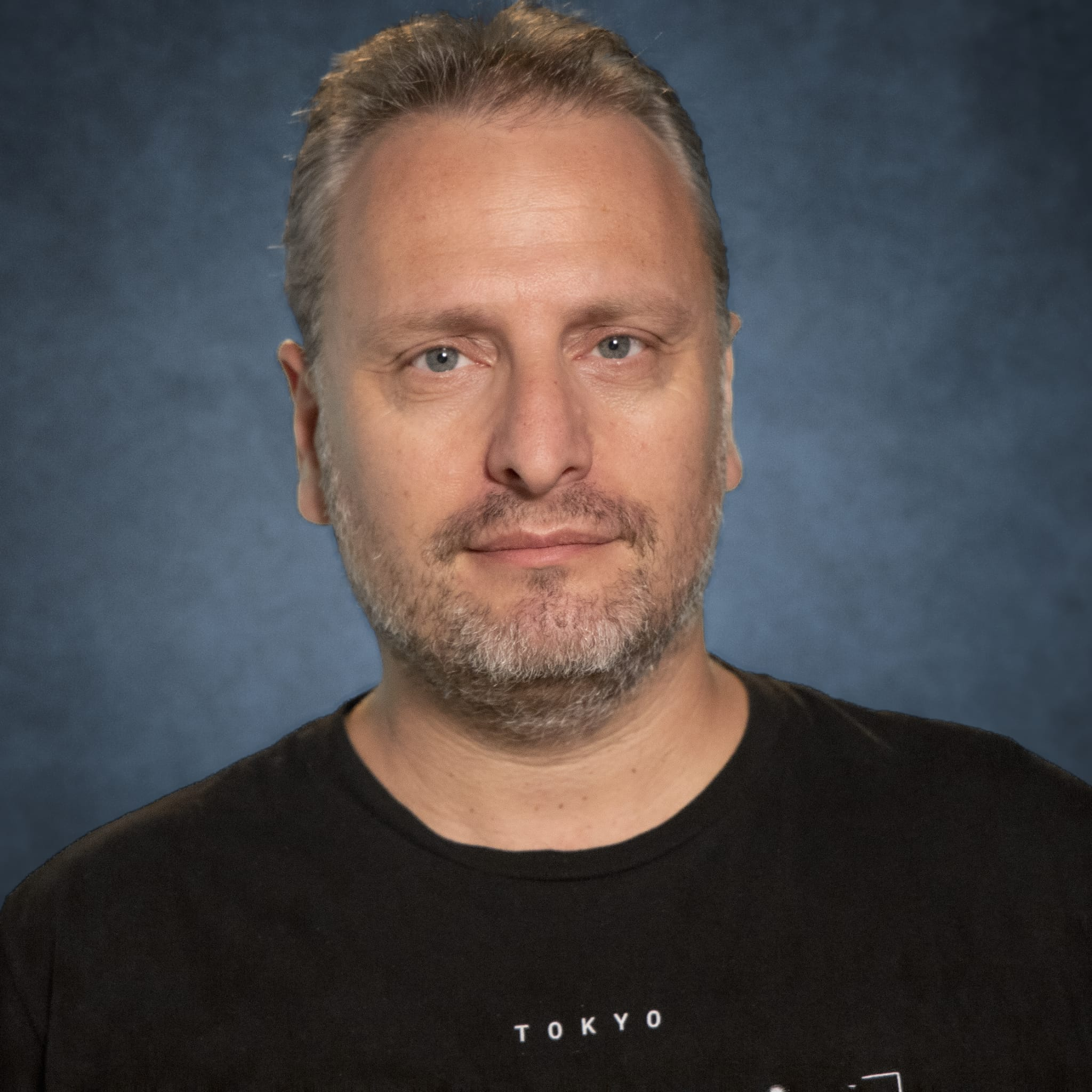
- Eyal Boers
- Born: July 8, 1975 (age 51); Jerusalem, Israel
- Citizenship: Israeli
- Education: Tel Aviv University
- Website: www.ariel.ac.il

Eyal Boers (Hebrew: אייל בורס; born July 8, 1975) is an Israeli film director, producer and researcher.

== Biography ==
Eyal Boers was born in Jerusalem. His parents moved to the Netherlands shortly after his birth, first to Leiden and then to Amsterdam. After completing his first year at the Jewish school "Rosh Pina" in Amsterdam, his parents returned to Israel and lived in Ramat Hasharon, where he was educated at Amirim primary school and in Alumim middle school. After completing his the 8th grade, his parents moved to Australia and lived in Sydney, where he graduated from Moriah College High School.

Boers holds a bachelor's degree in political science and philosophy, an MFA from the Department of Film and an MA from the Interdisciplinary Program for Graduate Studies. His Ph.D. degree was received from Tel Aviv University, in 2022, where he also received his other qualifications. Boers authored the thesis "The Jew in Dutch cinema: images, stereotypes and national identity", under the supervision of Professor Ilan Avisar.

During his academic studies, Boers worked as a cameraman from 2004 to 2010, including for the Israeli Channel 1, Dutch current affairs program EenVandaag and Globes (newspaper) TV. He was a member of the Israeli Documentary Filmmakers Forum from 2008 to 2018 and a member of the Israeli Academy of Film and Television from 2014 to 2018.

As part of his studies, he wrote, produced and directed in 2007 the short film "A Lone Soldier" which had been screened in many international film festivals. In 2008 he produced and directed the documentary "Classmates of Anne Frank" which had been screened at numerous international film festivals and had been broadcast by Israeli and Dutch television channels. In 2012, he produced and directed the documentary "Live or Die in Entebbe" which had been screened at various international film festivals and had been broadcast on Israeli and Canadian television channels. In 2021, he directed two episodes in the documentary series "Smokkelbern" for Omrop Fryslân.

Boers has worked as a lecturer in the Film Department at "Minshar School of Art" and Ariel University. In 2011, he was appointed head of the film and television track at Ariel University's School of Communication. In 2018, he was appointed chairman of the Israel Film Council.

He is head of the film and television track at Ariel University's School of Communication. Eyal is a lecturer on film history, European cinema, videography, cinematic expression, rhetoric and body language and the image of the Jew in Film. Was the chairman of the Israel Film Council, from 2018 till 2022.

In 2026 his book The Jew in Dutch Cinema: Images, Stereotypes and National Identity was published.
