= Myer Rosenblum =

- Born: Myer E. Rosenblum; 10 January 1907 Pretoria
- Died: 18 April 2002 (aged 95) Sydney
- School: Fort Street High
- University: University of Sydney
- Notable relative: Rupert Rosenblum
- Occupation: Solicitor

Rugby union career
- Position: flanker
International career
Years	Team	Apps	(Points)
1928	Wallabies	4	(9)

Myer E. Rosenblum OAM (10 January 1907 – 18 April 2002) was an Australian sportsman and lawyer. He was born in South Africa to parents who had migrated from present-day Belarus. His family moved to Sydney, Australia in 1914, and he was educated at Fort Street High School and Sydney University. He played four Test matches for the Australian Rugby Union team in 1928. He set up a law firm, "M. Rosenblum and Co" in the 1930s; in 1959 he employed as an articled clerk John Howard who later became an Australian prime minister. In his later years he was an active philanthropist. He died of a heart attack at the age of 95.

== Early life and education ==
Before his birth, Rosenblum's family emigrated from what is now Belarus but was then part of the Russian Empire to South Africa, where he was born in 1907. The family moved to Australia in 1914, to the inner western Sydney suburb of Marrickville. Myer and sister Sarah both won scholarships to the then non-co-educational Fort Street Boys and Girls Schools, and then to Sydney University.

== Sporting achievements ==
Rosenblum played at breakaway in four games for the New South Wales Rugby union team against the All-Blacks in 1928. At the time, the New South Wales Rugby Union was the peak Australian representative body; these games were retrospectively granted full "test" status by the Australian Rugby Union in 1986. He set an Australian record for the hammer throw in 1935, and represented Australia in that event at the 1938 then "British Empire Games". In addition, he was an accomplished tennis player and hurdler.

== As lawyer ==
Rosenblum's legal career has been reported as uneventful except his 1959 decision, as principal of the law firm M Rosenblum & Co, to employ a 19-year-old called John Howard as an articled clerk at the pay of £6 a week. Howard went on to become the 25th and second-longest serving Prime Minister of Australia More than a decade before his ascent to Prime Ministership, Rosenblum – a lifelong supporter of the Australian Labor Party – said Howard "would have made a wonderful Labor leader of the Ben Chifley type – you know, a thoroughly honest man of the people." Howard described Rosenblum as "one of the great characters that I've met in my life... a terrific teacher."

== Honours ==
Rosenblum was awarded Australian Sports Medal on 29 September 2000. He was awarded the Medal of the Order of Australia in the Australia Day Honours of 26 January 2001.

== Personal life ==
Rosenblum was an accomplished bassoon and contra-bassoon player and won a scholarship to the Sydney Conservatorium of Music. He met New Zealander Lyla Grant at a party listening to classical music. They were married for 55 years until her death in 1992. Daughter Germaine and son Rupert Rosenblum – later himself a Wallaby – were born of their marriage. Myer's only grandchild, Stephen, Germaine's son, followed in his grandfather's footsteps and took up a career in law, as a barrister. In his later life, Rosenblum assisted Moriah College, the Australian Jewish Welfare Society and other sporting and charitable organisations. Rosenblum died of a heart attack on 18 April 2002.

== See also ==
- List of select Jewish rugby union players
