= Yeshiva Centre, Sydney =

Yeshiva College Bondi Ltd
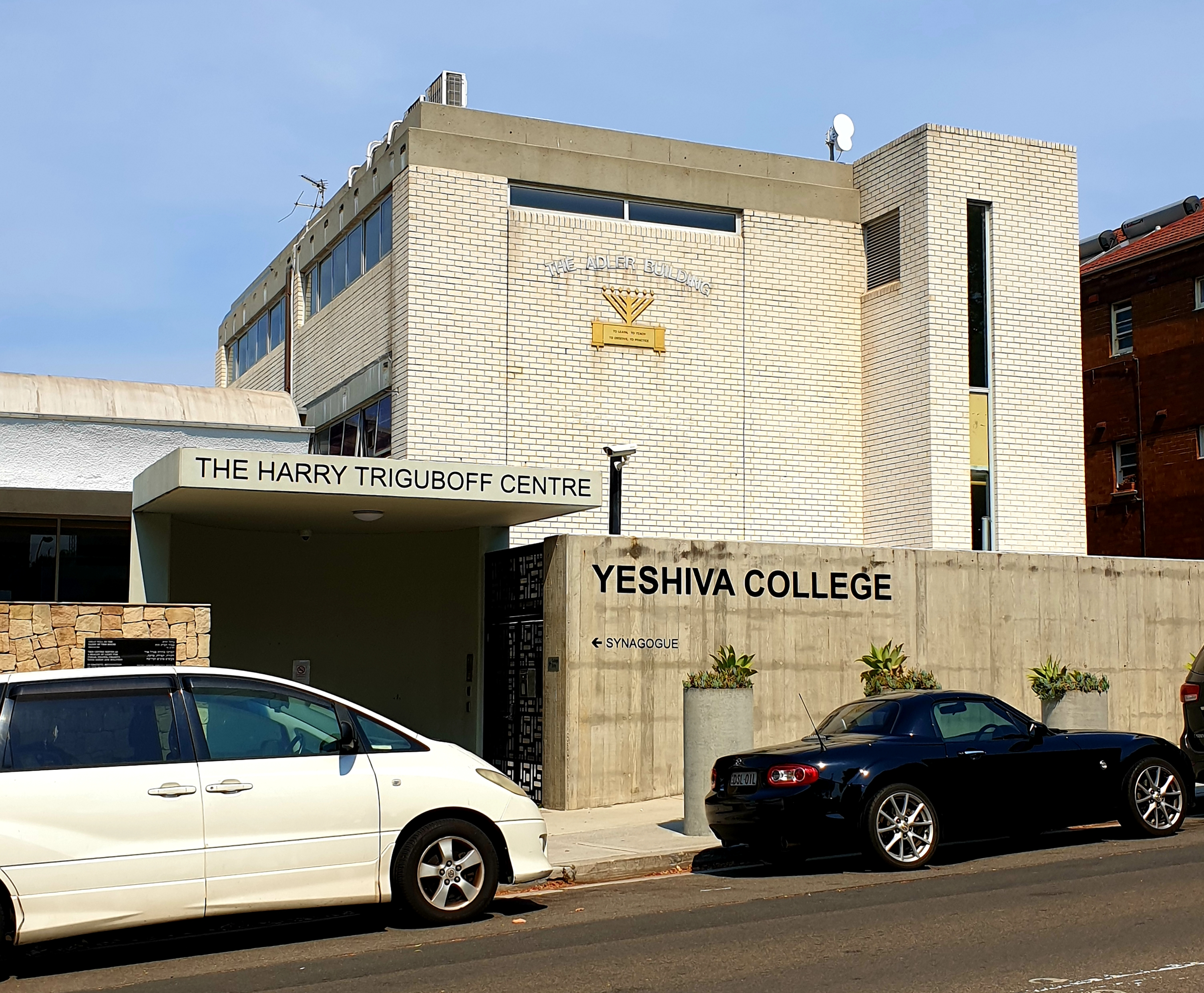

- Location in greater metropolitan Sydney

Religion
- Affiliation: Hasidic Judaism
- Rite: Chabad-Lubavitch
- Ecclesiastical or organisational status: Synagogue; Learning centre; Library
- Governing body: Chabad
- Status: Active

Location
- Location: 36 Flood Street, Bondi, Waverley Council, Sydney, New South Wales
- Country: Australia
- Coordinates: 33°53′31″S 151°15′34″E

Architecture
- Type: Synagogue
- Founder: Abraham Rabinovitch
- Completed: 1956; 70 years ago

Website
- {

The Yeshiva College, also known as the Harry O. Triguboff Centre, is a Hasidic Jewish synagogue, learning centre, and library of the Chabad-Lubavitch nusach, located at 36 Flood Street, in the Sydney suburb of Bondi, New South Wales, Australia. The Centre runs various adult and child-based educational programs.

== History ==
The centre was established in 1956 by Abraham Rabinovitch and others. The leaders from 1956 to 1968 were Rabbi G. Hertz and Rabbi C. E. Barzel. In 1968 the Yeshiva's board of trustees appointed Rabbi Pinchus Feldman to lead its synagogue and to assist with expanding its small ultra-orthodox Jewish day school.

Our Big Kitchen, a charity established by Yeshiva Sydney in 2005, operates from the Yeshiva.

=== 2003 arson attack ===
In late 2003, the student boarding house linked to the Yeshiva Centre was targeted in an arson attack, leaving the building damaged by the fire.

=== Royal Commission into Institutional Responses to Child Sexual Abuse ===
In February 2015 the Royal Commission into Institutional Responses to Child Sexual Abuse heard Rabbi Yossi Feldman testify, where he stated that he "was not aware it was illegal to touch a child's genitals". Feldman told the Commission that he did not find it necessary for victims to report sexual abuse to the police if offences took place decades prior. He proposed that the law be lenient on sexual predators who had not committed any sexual abuse for two decades if they had repented. His comments outraged the Australian Jewish community, and victims of sexual harassment called for him to stand down. Rabbi Yossi Feldman stood down from his administrative positions at the Yeshiva Centre. Due to their negligent handling of sex abuse in the Centre, survivor advocate, Manny Waks, placed the centre on his wall of shame.

The Royal Commission issued a case study on Yeshiva educational facilities in Sydney and Melbourne. The Commission reported that:

Despite his role as a director of Yeshiva College and the Dean of Yeshiva Gedolah Rabbinical College, Rabbi Yosef Feldman was either ignorant of or ill-informed about:

- conduct amounting to child sexual abuse
- the criminal nature of child sexual abuse
- the obligations in New South Wales to report complaints of child sexual abuse to external authorities, including the NSW Ombudsman.

— Report of Case Study No. 22: The response of Yeshiva Bondi and Yeshivah Melbourne to allegations of child sexual abuse made against people associated with those institutions. Royal Commission into Institutional Responses to Child Sexual Abuse.

== Yeshiva Gedolah Rabbinical College of Sydney ==
The Yeshiva Gedolah Rabbinical College, like other Chabad Yeshivot Gedolot, provides education and training to young men seeking ordination as rabbis. Established in 1986 by the Yeshiva Centre, it forms part of the Tomchei Temimim Yeshiva network. Rabbi Boruch Lesches served as its Rosh Yeshiva and Mashpia for almost twenty years. He has since left Sydney, and is currently serving as the rabbi of the Chabad-Lubavitch shul in Monsey, New York, which also contains a Yeshiva that is part of the Tomchei Temimim network.

The Yeshiva Gedolah was administered by Rabbi Yossi Feldman, a son of the Chabad Emissary for New South Wales, Head Rabbi and spiritual leader for Chabad-Lubavitch, New South Wales, Pinchus Feldman, until February 2015 when, following Rabbi Yossi Feldman's evidence to the Royal Commission into Institutional Responses to Child Sexual Abuse, the NSW Jewish Board of Deputies labelled his views repugnant and declared him to be "unfit to hold any position of authority or leadership in the Jewish community".

== Yeshiva College ==
Yeshiva College was a Jewish day school, established by the Yeshiva Centre in 1956. From 1968 to 2003 it was headed by Rabbi Pinchus Feldman. After financial difficulty, in late 2003 the Feldman family ceded control over the school to philanthropist Meir Moss for A$8,000,000. The school later rebranded as Kesser Torah College. In 2007 the Yeshiva opened a new school called Cheder Chabad Lubavitch, later renamed Yeshiva College Bondi Ltd.

== See also ==
- Hasidic Judaism
- History of the Jews in Australia
- List of synagogues in Australia
