= Josh Goot =

Australian fashion designer (born 1980)

- Born: Joshua Goot; 1980 (age 45–46); Sydney, New South Wales
- Occupation: Fashion designer

Joshua Goot (born 1980) is an Australian fashion designer and entrepreneur. Born in Sydney, he currently lives in New York.

== Early life ==
Goot was born in 1980 in Sydney, New South Wales. Goot later graduated from Moriah College in 1997 and began a BA in Communication (Media, Arts and Production) at the University of Technology Sydney. It was there that he developed an interest in fashion design. After one year, Goot deferred his studies to travel to Europe and the Middle East.

His first label, Platform, was founded in 2000 with his friend Josh Goulburn. The pair split in 2002, but Goot continued with Platform, taking the printed t-shirt line into a youth-focused, street-wear collection. Platform went defunct in 2004.

== Fashion career ==
In early 2005, Goot launched his label with a capsule of unisex tailored jersey essentials in grey marl and "futuristic" silver. In 2005, the Josh Goot debut collection won Australia’s Tiffany & Co. Designer of the Year Award at the Melbourne Fashion Festival and the Prix de Marie Claire Award for Best Up-and-Coming Designer. In May 2005, Josh Goot debuted a collection and introduced an aesthetic at Australian Fashion Week. Josh Goot pieces appeared on the cover of Women’s Wear Daily for its "marriage between traditional tailoring and the all American T".

In September 2006, Goot showed up at New York Fashion Week, presenting at the Matthew Marks Gallery. He moved to London in 2008, invited by the British Fashion Council to show at London Fashion Week.

Following the 2008 financial crisis, Goot experienced a downturn in his business and returned to Australia in 2009 to focus on his home market. The collections introduced a series of "innovative technological developments in textiles" developed in Goot’s Sydney studio.

In 2010, Josh Goot opened his first retail store in a converted gallery space on Glenmore Road, Paddington, an inner-city suburb of Sydney. In 2011, Goot signed with Australian department store David Jones, opening the Autumn/Winter 2012 launch with a tailored tuxedo suit worn by Miranda Kerr. In 2012, the label moved to Oxford Street, Sydney. Working with architect Andy McDonnell, the new environment introduced audiovisual elements and a retractable roof above a multi-colour carpet that was designed by Shane Sakkeus. In 2013, Goot opened in Melbourne.

== Collaborations ==
He has acted as an ambassador and advocate for Australian Merino Wool. In 2007, Josh Goot was one of the first Australian designers to collaborate with Target Australia in the Designers For Target initiative.

In 2010, Josh Goot collaborated with the Sydney Dance Company on Rafael Bonachella’s 6 Breaths, working with artist and designer Jonathan Zawada on a print-based, unisex identity for the production.

== Brand's identity ==
Goot also emphasises silk fabrics, Australian Merino wool and bonded viscose nylons to build an investment for the modern woman.

In 2013, Goot said, "What I wanted to do with the label was to create a modern, urban, Australian fashion brand. It was born out of these core ideals of modernity, modernism and a sense of sport, and I wanted it to capture an Australian point of view in a new way that hadn’t been expressed before." That year, Goot spoke at the Australian Financial Review’s Bespoke Summit at the Sydney Opera House about building a luxury fashion label in Australia.

== Liquidation ==
In February 2015, Josh Goot’s eponymous fashion label entered voluntary administration amid financial difficulties. Goot publicly described the business as being in a “downward spiral”, citing “well-documented external factors at play within the domestic industry.” Josh Goot Pty Limited (ACN 129 449 565) was placed into creditors’ voluntary liquidation, with liquidators appointed on 26 March 2019, according to an Australian Securities and Investments Commission published notice.

== Awards ==
- 2005 Winner Tiffany & Co. Young Designer of the Year Award, Melbourne
- 2005 Winner Best Up-and-Coming Designer Prix de Marie Claire Awards, Sydney.
- 2008 Finalist The Fashion Group International. Rising Star, New York.
- 2009 Finalist International Mango Fashion Award, Barcelona
- 2009 Winner Best Designer Prix de Marie Claire Awards, Sydney
