= Rupert Rosenblum =

- Born: Rupert George Rosenblum; 1 January 1942 Watsons Bay, New South Wales
- School: The Scots College
- Notable relative: Myer Rosenblum

Rugby union career
- Position: fly-half
Senior career
Years	Team	Apps	(Points)
1959-	Eastern Suburbs RUFC		
-1977	Sydney University Football Club		
Provincial / State sides
Years	Team	Apps	(Points)
- New South Wales
International career
Years	Team	Apps	(Points)
1969–70	Wallabies	3	(11)

Rupert George Rosenblum (born 1 January 1942) is a former Australian Rugby Union player for the Australia national rugby union team.

== Career ==
Rosenblum played 3 test matches in 1969-1970; at that point in time, he and Myer Rosenblum were the second* father and son to have represented Australia in Rugby union. The McLeans- Douglas James 1904-05 and Alexander Douglas 1933-36 were the first, despite claims to the contrary.
