= Phineas Selig =

New Zealand journalist, newspaper editor and manager and sports administrator

Phineas Selig (1856–1941) was a New Zealand journalist, newspaper editor and manager, sports administrator. He was born in Melbourne, Victoria, Australia in 1856.
