= Maurice Joel =

Jewish brewer and businessman in New Zealand

- Born: 1829; North Shields, England
- Died: 13 November 1907 (aged 77–78); Dunedin, New Zealand
- Occupations: Brewer, merchant, public figure
- Known for: Brewing industry and business activity in Dunedin during the Otago gold rush era

Maurice Joel (1829 – 13 November 1907) was a prominent brewer and public figure in Dunedin, New Zealand.

Joel was born in North Shields, in northern England, one of seven children of Prussian-born Trytle Joel and his wife Jane Grace Joel (née Isaacs). His initial training was as an engraver. He formed a trading business with his brother, working mainly around the industrial cities of the north Midlands. In 1853 he emigrated to Australia, working as a gold buyer during the Victoria gold rush in Melbourne and Ballarat. With the advent of the Otago gold rush in 1861, he moved to Dunedin, where he continued in business, opening a general merchant store and also became interested in local politics.

During his first year in the city, he also helped found the Dunedin Jewish Congregation. From the 1860s through to the turn of the century he held several local political and public posts; he was on the committee of the 1889 New Zealand and South Seas Exhibition (1889), a member of the Otago Harbour Board, and a director of both an insurance company and a coal company. Joel's main business venture in Dunedin was as founder and owner of the Red Lion Brewery. As head of Red Lion, Joel had built one of Dunedin's most prominent public houses, the Captain Cook Tavern.

In 1859, Joel married Katherine (Kate) Woolf, originally from Cape Town, Cape Colony. Together they had nine children, among them the artist Grace Joel and cricketer Louis Joel. Joel's grandson, Maurice Andrew Joel was a prominent barrister in Dunedin.

The Joels lived at Eden Bank House, a prominent structure in Regent Street, Dunedin North, before moving to Onslow Street in the south of the city where they lived until Joel's death in 1907. Joel is buried in the Jewish section of the Dunedin Southern Cemetery.
