= David Horwitz =

Australian rugby union player

David Jason Horwitz
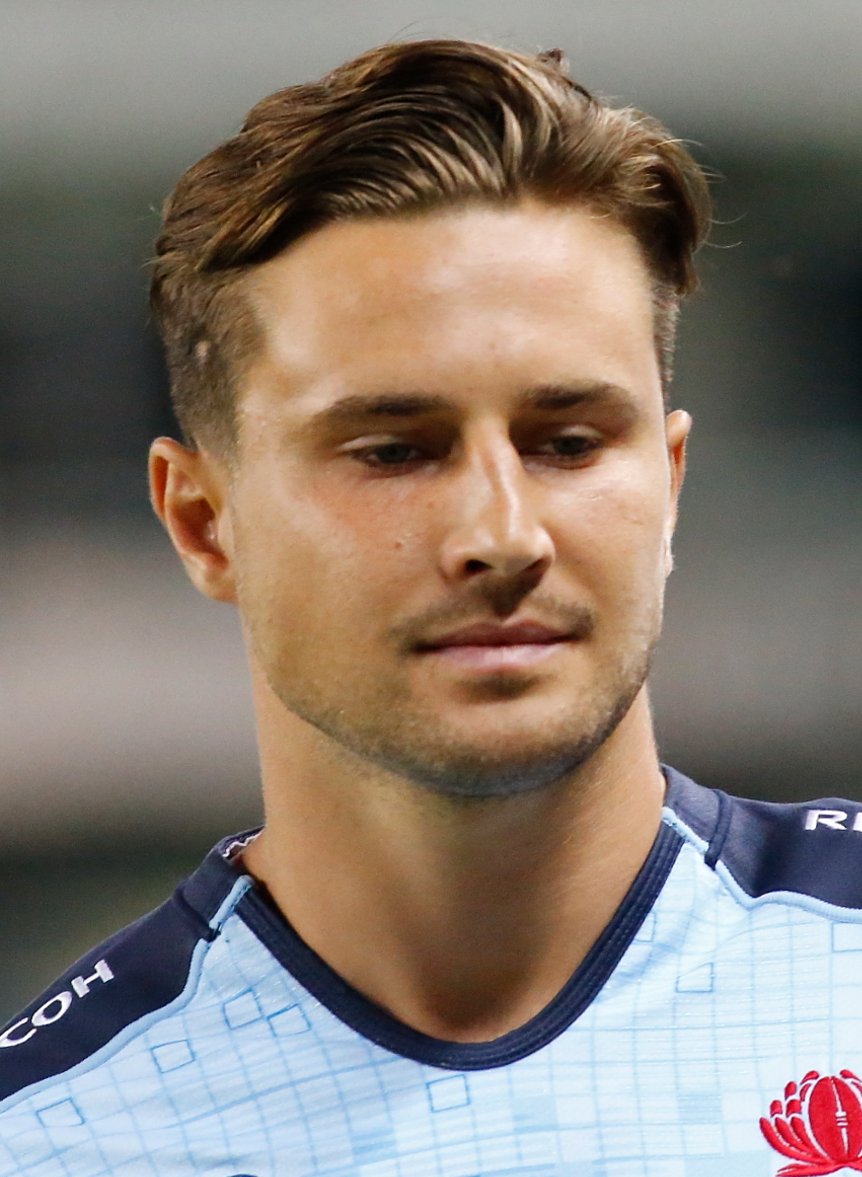
- Horwitz with the Waratahs in 2017
- Full name: David Jason Horwitz
- Born: 30 September 1994 (age 32) Sydney, New South Wales, Australia
- Height: 1.82 m (6 ft 0 in)
- Weight: 92 kg (14 st 7 lb; 203 lb)
- School: Moriah College, Queens Park; Scots College, Sydney
- University: University of Sydney

Rugby union career
- Position(s): Fly-half, Centre
Amateur team(s)
| Years | Team | Apps | (Points) |
| 2013– | Randwick | 63 | (208) |
- Correct as of 16 October 2020
Senior career
| Years | Team | Apps | (Points) |
| 2014–2020 | NSW Country Eagles | 18 | (10) |
| 2018–2020 | Connacht | 14 | (28) |
- Correct as of 11 January 2020
Super Rugby
| Years | Team | Apps | (Points) |
| 2014–2017 | Waratahs | 27 | (12) |
| 2018 | Rebels | 0 | (0) |
- Correct as of 27 December 2018
International career
| Years | Team | Apps | (Points) |
| 2011–2012 | Australia Schoolboys | | |
| 2014 | Australia U20 | 3 | (2) |
- Correct as of 9 November 2015

David Jason Horwitz (born 30 September 1994), commonly referred to as Dave, is an Australian former rugby union player. Horwitz previously played as a centre for Sydney rugby club Randwick in the Shute Shield, the New South Wales Waratahs in the Super Rugby, Irish rugby club Connacht and the New South Wales Country Eagles of the National Rugby Championship (NRC).

He became the first Australian Jewish person to play in the Super Rugby.

== Early life and career ==
Horwitz was born in Sydney, Australia to South African Jews. He played junior rugby for Easts Wallaroos and later Scots College. He attended the aforementioned school, alongside Moriah College.

Horwitz has represented Australia at schoolboy and under-20 level. Horwitz is contracted with Connacht for the 2018–19 seasons.

As of 2018 Horwitz was the first, and currently only, Jew to play in the Super Rugby for an Australian club. In 2016, when speaking about being Jewish, Horwitz said: “I want to be known as a footballer on merit and I also want to be known in the Jewish community because I’m a proud Jew and I know that does coincide with the rugby because it’s almost a strange thing because there’s not a lot of Jewish sportsmen out there.”

Horwitz played for the New South Wales Waratahs, the Melbourne Rebels, of the Super Rugby, and Connacht (Pro14) in between 2014 and 2020. In Australian domestic rugby he played for Randwick in club rugby, and the New South Wales Country Eagles, in the National Rugby Championship (NRC).

== Super Rugby statistics ==
As of 15 July 2018

| Season | Team | Games | Starts | Sub | Mins | Tries | Cons | Pens | Drops | Points | Yel | Red |
|---|---|---|---|---|---|---|---|---|---|---|---|---|
| 2014 | Waratahs | 0 | 0 | 0 | 0 | 0 | 0 | 0 | 0 | 0 | 0 | 0 |
| 2015 | Waratahs | 0 | 0 | 0 | 0 | 0 | 0 | 0 | 0 | 0 | 0 | 0 |
| 2016 | Waratahs | 13 | 5 | 8 | 595 | 1 | 1 | 0 | 0 | 7 | 0 | 0 |
| 2017 | Waratahs | 14 | 11 | 3 | 807 | 1 | 0 | 0 | 0 | 5 | 0 | 0 |
| 2018 | Rebels | 0 | 0 | 0 | 0 | 0 | 0 | 0 | 0 | 0 | 0 | 0 |
| Total | | 27 | 16 | 11 | 1402 | 2 | 1 | 0 | 0 | 12 | 0 | 0 |
