= Our Big Kitchen =

Our Big Kitchen, abbreviated as OBK, is a charity based in Sydney, Australia that provides a large commercial grade kitchen for community use. The kitchen facilities are used by various community groups to prepare and distribute meals. The community kitchen concept is similar to that of a soup kitchen, but incorporates volunteer and common-effort aspects closer to that of a community garden. Housed in the Yeshivah Centre, Sydney, Our Big Kitchen, a project of the Sydney Jewish community, is accessed by a large spectrum of both Jewish and non-Jewish community groups. OBK was founded by Rabbi Dovid Slavin and Laya Slavin in February 2005.

== Services ==
The kitchen has a 300-square-metre (3,200 sq ft) kosher kitchen. The organisation organizes events where community volunteers prepare food that is distributed to those in need. OBK organises birthday parties where participants cook food which is later distributed. The kitchen runs programs aimed at helping new mothers overcome post natal depression, corporate team building exercises where employees prepare food together, cook ins for single members of the community. The kitchen is also made available to caterers looking to start a business in the food industry.

Our Big Kitchen came to prominence to a wider public when it organised large scale community cooking for victims of the Black Saturday bushfires of 2009.

Our Big Kitchen has been visited by politicians and dignitaries who have lent their support, including Prime Ministers Kevin Rudd and Malcolm Turnbull, the governor-general Quentin Bryce, former premier Nathan Rees and Tanya Plibersek, the Member for Sydney.

== See also ==
- OzHarvest
- Yeshivah Centre, Sydney
