= Moriah College =

Moriah War Memorial College
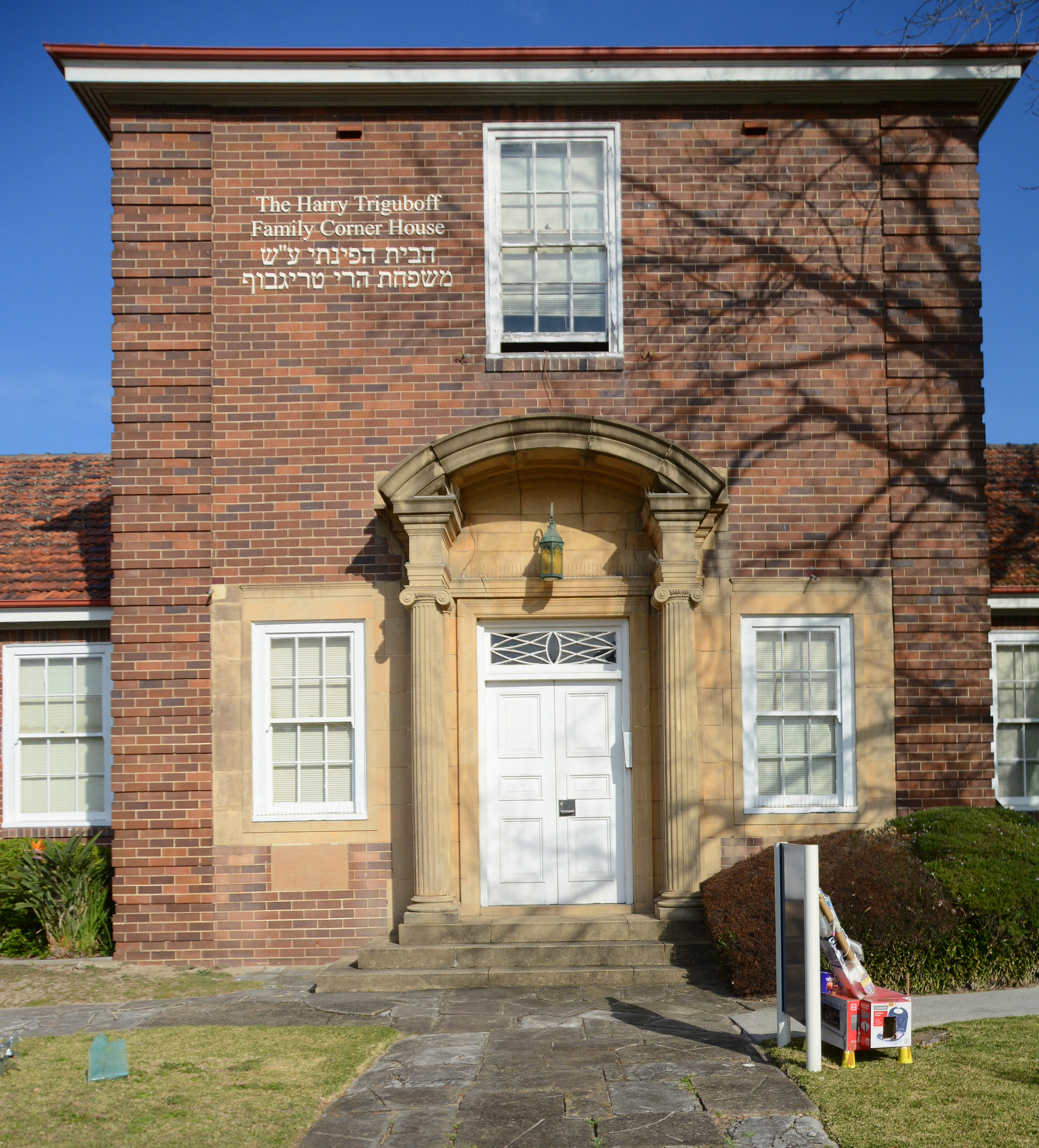
- Harry Triguboff Family Corner House, Moriah College

Location
- Queens Park, New South Wales, Australia; NSW; Australia; 33°53′58″S 151°14′38″E

Information
- Type: Independent co-educational early learning, primary and secondary day school
- Motto: To Learn, To Heed, To Act
- Religious affiliation: Modern Orthodox Judaism
- Established: 1942; 84 years ago
- Founder: Abraham Rabinovitch
- Status: Open
- Principal: Mira Hasofer
- Teaching staff: c. 260
- Years: Early learning and K–12
- Enrolment: c. 1,700 (2023)
- Campus type: Urban
- Colours: Navy blue and sky blue
- Sports: Basketball Cricket Netball Rugby Soccer Tennis
- Feeder schools: Mount Sinai College
- Affiliations: Jewish Communal Appeal
- Website: moriah.nsw.edu.au

Moriah College is an independent Modern Orthodox Jewish co-educational early learning, primary and secondary day school, located in Queens Park, an eastern suburb of Sydney, New South Wales, Australia. The college provides education from early learning through Kindergarten to Year 12.

The college is a member of the Jewish Communal Appeal (JCA).

== History ==
Founded in 1942 by Abraham Rabinovitch, Moriah College started as a small school located in Glenayr Avenue, Bondi, which is still in use today as an affiliated kindergarten. Harold Nagley, the first principal of Moriah, travelled door to door in an attempt to recruit pupils. In 1952, Rabinovitch purchased a 1 1/2-acre (0.6 ha) Bellevue Hill property from the estate of the late Mark Foy for A£30,500. Following renovations, the college opened at the Bellevue Hill site in 1953, with 57 students.

Further renovations were completed in the mid-1960s and, by 1967, the King David School in Edgecliff, formed by the New South Wales Jewish Board of Deputies in 1960, merged with Moriah College. The King David School relocated to a property in Dover Road, Rose Bay, purchased from another school, and the Bellevue Hill site was used as a high school. From 1975, the college rapidly expanded from 500 to 800 students, and additional properties were acquired in Bellevue Hill to allow for further expansion.

By the early 1980s, the Government of New South Wales decided to amalgamate two public schools in Dover Heights and sell the unused campus. Moriah College made an offer for this campus, but the Premier, Neville Wran, rejected the offer, following a public campaign organised by the New South Wales Teachers Federation. Wran offered the college a lease over land located in Queens Park, on the site of the old Eastern Suburbs Hospital, and construction of a new high school began. Amid cost overruns and delays, by late 1993 the college decided to relocate the primary school to the site as well, and sell all land held at Bellevue Hill. Over $12 million was realised from the sale of the college's Bellevue Hill properties.

The college is now entirely situated on the Queens Park campus, having purchased the land from the Government of New South Wales in 2011 for $27 million, with the final instalment of $20 million payable in February 2014. Some older buildings remain from the Eastern Suburbs Hospital that previously occupied part of the site. Additional affiliated preschool campuses are located in Bondi, Bondi Junction, and Rose Bay.

== Extracurricular ==
The school's Symphonic Wind Ensemble won the NSW Junior band championships in May 2012 building on the work of a number of band tours.

The Moriah Football (soccer) First XI won the prestigious NSW Combined Independent Schools Cup for the first time in 2015, beating Barker College in the grand final. The team then went on to retain the title in 2016, becoming the first school to do so, after coming back from 3-1 down to beat Newington College 4–3 in the grand final.

== Notable alumni ==
- Cheryl Bart AO, lawyer, company director, and expeditioner
- Nikki Bart, Australian mountain climber and medical doctor with a specialist interest in hypoxia secondary to high altitude
- Linton Besser, Walkley Award-winning investigative journalist
- Ryan Blumberg, former professional footballer who played as a defender for Charlton Athletic in 2017 and accepted a two-year scholarship at the University of Maryland, USA in 2019
- Eyal Boers, filmmaker and academic; director of Classmates of Anne Frank and head of the Film & TV track at Ariel University
- Jonathan Daddia, 2010 MasterChef contestant
- Yuval Freilich (born 1995), Israeli épée fencer, 2019 European Épée Champion
- Michelle Haber AM (class of 1973), a leading Australian cancer scientist at the Children's Cancer Institute of Australia
- Josh Goot, founder of the label Josh Goot, which went into liquidation in 2019
- David Horwitz, Professional rugby union player; has played for the NSW Waratahs and Melbourne Rebels
- Sallie-Anne Huckstepp, police whistle blower
- Ben Lee, musician
- Sharri Markson, investigative journalist, author, and television host. She is the host of Sharri on Sky News Australia and a former editor of The Sunday Telegraph
- Nick Molnar, entrepreneur; co-founder of Afterpay and Australia’s youngest self-made billionaire
- Ben Pasternak, co-founder and CEO of SIMULATE. Founded cryptocurrency startup Believe, now being sued for same
- Henry Roth, fashion designer

== See also ==
- List of non-government schools in New South Wales
