= Abraham Rabinovitch =

Australian-Russian property developer

- Born: Abraham Isaac Rabinovitch; 5 November 1889; Tiraspol, Russian Empire
- Died: 26 July 1964 (aged 74); Bellevue Hill, New South Wales
- Occupations: Property developer; merchant
- Known for: Philanthropy
- Spouse: Chaya (Hake) Sara Gitman (m. ~1910; dec'd. 1965)

Abraham Isaac Rabinovitch (1889–1964) was an Australian-Russian property developer and well-respected pioneer of the Sydney Modern Orthodox Jewish community; in particular as a founder and philanthropist of Sydney's full-time Jewish educational institutions.

== Biography ==
Rabinovitch was born in Tiraspol, Russian Empire, on 5 November 1889. He married his first cousin, Chaya Gitman, in about 1910; immigrated via Harbin to Australia in about 1915; and after initially trying to make a living in Brisbane, Queensland, they moved to Sydney in 1921 and became naturalised Australians. Rabinovitch and his wife remained childless despite several miscarriages.

Rabinovitch was a real estate investor who successfully developed properties in the Sydney central business district and the suburbs of Bondi and Bondi Junction. He was supportive of the Sydney Jewish community, founding two large educational institutions, the Yeshiva Centre and Moriah College. He also built New South Wales' first mikvah at 117 Glenayr Avenue in Bondi.

He died in his Bellevue Hill home on 26 July 1964 and was buried in Rookwood Cemetery. His portrait by Joseph Wolinski is held by Moriah College.
