= Joe Saragossi =

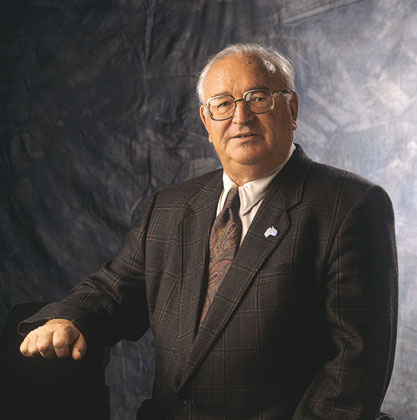
- Joseph (Joe) Saragossi

Background information
- Born: July 15, 1921, New York, NY
- Died: October 10, 2005, Brisbane, QLD

Joseph Saragossi AO (15 July 1921 – 10 October 2005) was an Australian businessman and former chairman of G.James Glass & Aluminium.

== Business career ==
The G.James Group of Companies was begun by George James in 1917. Initially the business was based on buying cases of glass and selling it cut-to-size to timber joiners in Queensland and New South Wales. Upon James' death in 1958 Saragossi, together with his wife Pearle and sister-in-law Gertie Baratin, founded a private company in 1959.

Having worked on growing and guiding the success of the G.James Group for over 46 years Saragossi was still maintaining a regular presence around his many plants and offices well into his eighties. Cancer eventually killed him in October 2005. In the years prior to his death he had undertaken significant capital projects to ensure his legacy was complete – all of which have now come to fruition.

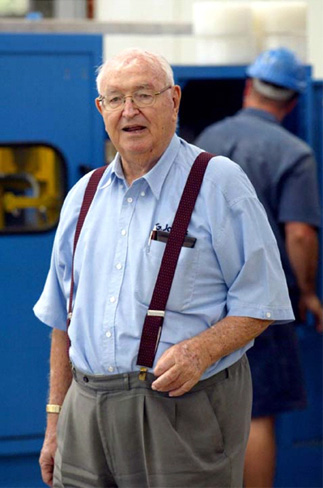
Saragossi at work

== Awards and recognition ==
- In June 1998, he was awarded an Officer of the Order of Australia in the Australia Day Honours of 1998, for "Service to the Glass and Aluminium Industry, and to the Jewish Community. AO S242 1998".
- In January 2001, he was awarded the Centenary Medal for "distinguished service in manufacturing industry".
- In September 2009, he was inducted into the Queensland Business Leaders Hall of Fame.
