= G.James Glass & Aluminium =

- Type: Private
- Industry: Manufacturing
- Founded: 1917
- Headquarters: Brisbane, Queensland, Australia
- Key people: Lewis Saragossi, Chairman and Managing Director
- Number of employees: 2500
- Website: www.gjames.com.au

G.James Glass & Aluminium is an Australian industrial company, producing glass and aluminium products. G.James is a major Australian glass processor, aluminium window and door fabricator & contractor and production of extruded aluminium profiles.

== Company history ==
The origin of the G.James Group of Companies began in 1913 when an enterprising George James arrived in Australia after migrating from England. After working for various building related companies in Brisbane, George decided to use his skills as a glazier, along with his knowledge of sales and purchasing, to establish G.James Glass Merchants at West End (Brisbane) in 1917.

Initially the business was based on buying cases of glass and selling it cut-to-size to timber joiners in Queensland and New South Wales. Upon George's death in 1958 his son-in-law Joseph (Joe) Saragossi, together with his wife Pearle and sister-in-law Gertie Baratin, founded a private company in 1959. Joe Saragossi's son Lewis took over as chairman of directors in 2006, and at the same time, Lewis' daughter Rachel became a director.

In 2006, the company won an Australian Window Association (AWA) Design Award for the Best Use of Windows and Doors. The company has since been recognised for innovation in glass, for example, its design of a bifold door retractable roller screen and as winner of the Residential Window or Glass Project Over $80K award at the 2024 AGWA Queensland Design & Industry Awards.
