= Yossi Feldman =

Australian rabbi

Yossi Feldman is an Australian rabbi. He has been a Rabbi in the Yeshiva Centre and Chabad NSW for the past 32 years. He was the President of the RCNSW for 3 years from 2009-2012 and Rabbi of Southern Sydney Synagogue from 1993-2015.

== Overview ==
=== Family ===
Feldman's father, Pinchus, is the head of the Sydney Chabad institutions in Sydney since 1968. Feldman's grandfather, Chaim Gutnick was a high-profile rabbi in Melbourne. He has a number of high-profile uncles, including mining magnate Joseph Gutnick, senior rabbi on the Sydney Beth Din Moshe Gutnick, and the senior rabbi on the Melbourne Beth Din, Mordechai Gutnick. His uncle, Joseph had provided money to the synagogue and was in a legal dispute with the Feldman family when he attempted to sell the synagogue site to developers.

=== 2015 Royal Commission appearance ===
In 2015, Feldman’s testified at a Royal Commission. His testimony was scrutinised in the Jewish and general media. Following the backlash from his appearance, Feldman attacked the media saying that their reporting "encourages even people who may not be real victims or may want to be considered heroes". An editorial in Australian Jewish News called his testimony "our darkest week" as a community and singled out Feldman and his father for particular condemnation. The editorial claimed that it had not seen an improvement in culture from the period when the abuse occurred. Feldman's testimony was widely condemned across the community. He later resigned from his positions. Feldman threatened to sue news organisations over their reporting of his testimony. The International Business Times withdrew their reporting and apologized. In addition, Australian Jewish News, The Guardian, The Herald Sun, The Daily Telegraph, The Australian, ABC, SBS, The Daily Beast, the Council of Orthodox Synagogues of Australasia, The Executive Council of Australian Jewry and The New South Wales Jewish Board of Deputies were all threatened with legal action over their reporting. The ABC subsequently clarified the issue with an editors note at end of article. On 31 January 2020 the judgement by Feldman against Nationwide News, Herald and Weekly Times, the Special Broadcasting Corporation and individual journalists in the Supreme Court of NSW was made for the case heard in May and August 2018. Judgments were made against the plaintiff (Feldman) and defendants’ costs awarded to him.

=== Role in kosher certification ===
Feldman was providing a rival kosher certification to the mainstream Kashrut Authority, but resigned from that position following the Royal Commission. When he initially provided the certification the NSW Rabbinical Council voted 18–3 against Feldman. Following this vote Feldman, a former president of the organisation, resigned.

=== Removal from Yeshiva Centre ===
Following financial difficulties, businessman Harry Triguboff purchased the Yeshiva Centre and leased it back to the Feldmans for a peppercorn rent. Triguboff handed control of the organisation to Rabbi Dovid Slavin. Feldman took Triguboff to court where he lost and was forced to vacate the premises.

== See also ==
- Judaism in Australia
