= Grace Joel =

New Zealand artist (1865–1924)

Grace Jane Joel (28 May 1865–6 March 1924) was a New Zealand artist best known for her ability as a portraitist and figure painter.

== Early life ==
Grace Joel was born in Dunedin, New Zealand on 28 May 1865, the sixth of nine children. Her English-born parents, Maurice Joel and Kate Woolf, were prominent and cultivated members of Dunedin's Jewish community, who worked as importers of wine and spirits. Grace Joel was determined to pursue an art career from an early age. After attending Otago Girls' High School from 1875 to 1882, she became an elected member of the Otago Art Society in 1886. From 1888 to 1889 she studied at the National Gallery of Victoria Art School in Melbourne, returning there in 1891 to continue studies with tutors like Frederick McCubbin and Lindsay Bernard Hall.

== Career ==
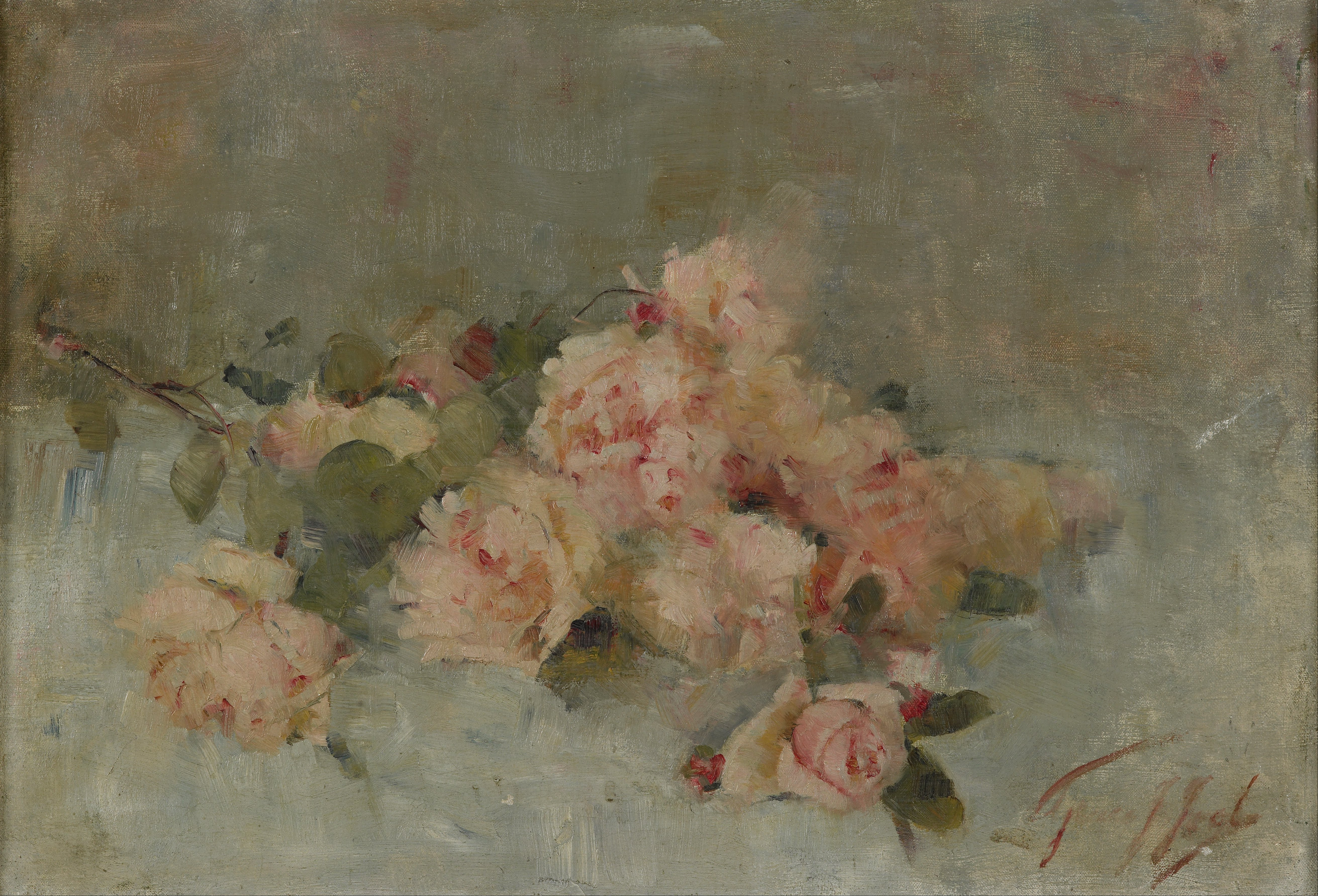
Roses, circa 1895

Joel returned to Dunedin in 1894, ready to establish herself as a professional artist. She became involved in the Otago Art Society and the Easel Club, where she associated with Italian artist G. P. Nerli (among others). She distinguished herself in the local art scene by focusing on figures and portraits, often drawing on a rich palette of colour.

Eager to further establish her artistic reputation, Joel left New Zealand for Europe in 1899. She settled in London but also worked in France and the Netherlands, exhibiting regularly at the Royal Academy of Arts in London and the Société des artistes français in Paris with a measure of success. Although she returned to New Zealand briefly in 1906, Joel spent the remainder of her life living and working in Europe.

Joel died of cancer at Kensington, London on 6 March 1924. She bequeathed £500 to endow a scholarship for students of painting at the National Gallery School in Melbourne, for painting from the nude.

Joel Place, in the Canberra suburb of Conder, is named in her honour.

== Works in collections ==
Title	Year	Medium	Gallery no.	Gallery	Location
Roses	circa 1895	Oil on canvas	2006-0007-2	Museum of New Zealand Te Papa Tongarewa	Wellington, New Zealand
Little Nell	circa 1895	Oil on canvas	2010-0009-1	Museum of New Zealand Te Papa Tongarewa	Wellington, New Zealand
Study of a young girl, half length	circa 1895-1900	Charcoal on paper	2014/5/3	Auckland Art Gallery	Auckland, New Zealand
Portrait of G. P. Nerli	mid 1890s	Oil on canvas on plywood	8568	Art Gallery of New South Wales	Sydney, Australia
A Young Girl in Blue Holding Primroses	circa 1895	Pastel on canvas	27-1979	Dunedin Public Art Gallery	Dunedin, New Zealand
A Rose 'midst Poppies	1895	Oil on canvas	69/530	Christchurch Art Gallery	Christchurch, New Zealand
A Time of Prayer	1904	Oil on canvas	79/285	Christchurch Art Gallery	Christchurch, New Zealand
Girl with scarf	circa 1896	Oil on canvas	2010/7	Auckland Art Gallery	Auckland, New Zealand
Memories: Portrait of Kate Morrison	circa 1897	Oil on canvas	236-1969	Dunedin Public Art Gallery	Dunedin, New Zealand
Portrait of Vivien Oakden	circa 1898	Oil on canvas	76/17 a5342	Hocken Pictorial Collections, University of Otago	Dunedin, New Zealand
(Rt Hon) Richard John Seddon	1906 (?)	Oil on canvas	G-632	Alexander Turnbull Library, National Library of New Zealand	Wellington, New Zealand
Mother and child	circa 1910	Oil on canvas	1983-0069-1	Museum of New Zealand Te Papa Tongarewa	Wellington, New Zealand
Mother and child	circa 1904	Oil on canvas	1957/18/2	Auckland Art Gallery	Auckland, New Zealand
Reclining Nude	circa 1895-1905	Oil on canvas	7-1985	Dunedin Public Art Gallery	Dunedin, New Zealand
The sweeper	Unknown	Oil on canvas	1-1xxx	Dunedin Public Art Gallery	Dunedin, New Zealand
Portrait Study of a Child	Unknown	Charcoal on paper	244-1982	Dunedin Public Art Gallery	Dunedin, New Zealand
Portrait of Arthur Streeton	circa 1900-1905	Oil on canvas on hardboard	5722	Art Gallery of New South Wales	Sydney, Australia
Girl in a pink dress	circa 1920	Oil on canvas	1983-0069-2	Museum of New Zealand Te Papa Tongarewa	Wellington, New Zealand
The yellow sun-bonnet	Unknown			Olveston Historic Home	Dunedin, New Zealand
