= Hugo Bergmann =

Israeli philosopher (1883–1975)

- הוגו ברגמן
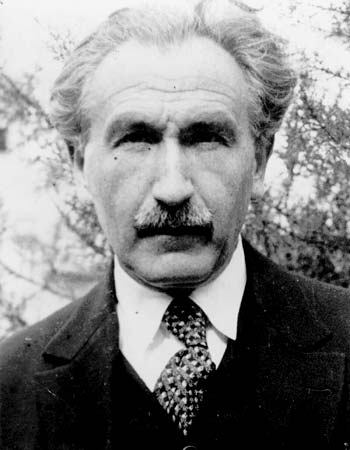
- Bergmann, 1939
- Born: Samuel Hugo Bergmann; December 25, 1883; Prague, Bohemia, Austria-Hungary
- Died: June 18, 1975 (aged 91); Jerusalem, Israel
- Occupation: Philosopher
- Children: Martin S. Bergmann Eva Bergmann-Short, David Bergmann Core
- Relatives: Michael Bergmann (grandson); Pavel Bergmann (nephew).Lydia Frank (granddaughter ) Miranda Short (granddaughter), Ann Greenberg (granddaughter)

Hugo Bergmann (Hebrew: שמואל הוגו ברגמן; December 25, 1883 – June 18, 1975) was an Israeli philosopher, born in Prague.

== Biography ==
Hugo Samuel Bergmann was born and raised in Prague, Austria-Hungary. He was a member of the Prague intelligentsia visiting the salon group that met at the house of Berta Fanta. Bergmann married her daughter Else Fanta.

Bergmann and his wife immigrated to Palestine in 1920. They lived in the Rehavia neighborhood of Jerusalem. Bergmann served as the director of the Jewish National Library between 1920 and 1935. He brought Gershom Scholem from Germany to serve as the head of the Judaica Division. In 1936 he married Escha Else Bergmann who was Scholem's first wife.

Together with Martin Buber, he founded Brit Shalom, an organization espousing a binational solution for promoting the co-existence of Jews and Arabs in the State of Israel.

Bergmann was the father of Martin S. Bergmann, professor of psychology at New York University, the uncle of the Czech philosopher and historian Pavel Bergmann and the grandfather of the American director, writer and producer Michael Bergmann.

== Academic career ==
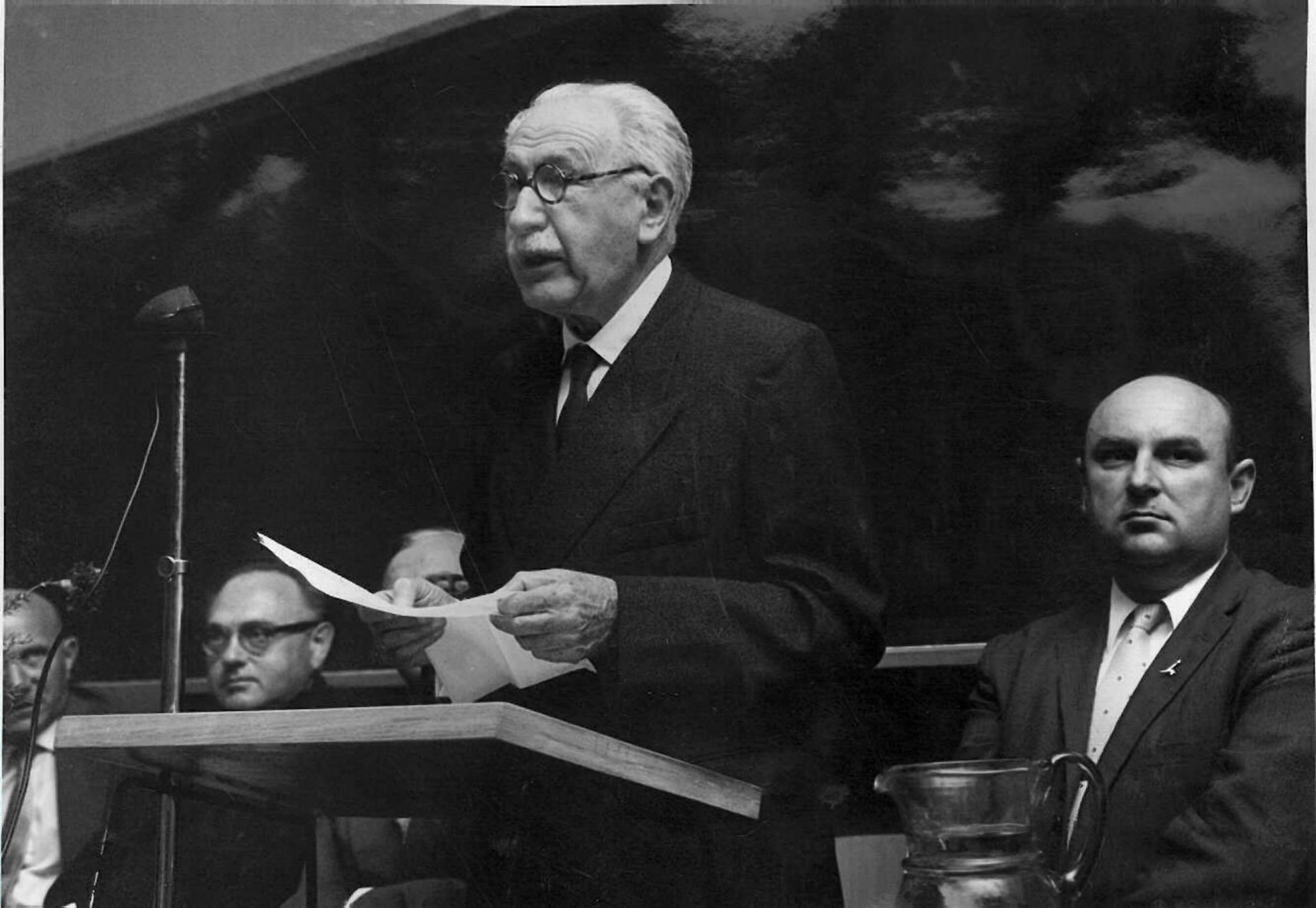
Hugo Bergmann, 1959

He became a professor at the Hebrew University of Jerusalem, and later on the dean of the university. He was friends with Franz Kafka, who was a schoolmate of his, the philosopher Felix Weltsch, who later worked at the Hebrew University Library in Jerusalem, and Max Brod, whom he introduced to Zionism before 1910.

He wrote on the nature of quantum mechanics and causality where he interpreted spontaneity in nature with the psychological idea that the closer we come to elements in nature or components in the individual, the less tenable is strict causal determinism and the more freedom we must grant to decisive personal elements: "In corresponding areas of physics, the statistical law of averages takes on the same functions in determining temporal position and in prediction and reconstruction that the strict law of causality previously covered, but with the distinction that the individual case could be temporally located and predicted or reconstructed before, whereas now we deal only with the average." (1929)

He translated several of Rudolf Steiner's books about Threefold Social Order into Hebrew.

== Awards and recognition ==
- Bergmann was twice a recipient of the Israel Prize:
  - in 1954, for the humanities
  - in 1974 for his special contribution to society and the State of Israel.
- He was a recipient of the Yakir Yerushalayim (Worthy Citizen of Jerusalem) award in 1967, the year of the award's inauguration.
- He is also a recipient of the Tchernichovsky Prize for exemplary translation.

== Selected works ==
- Das philosophische Werk Bernard Bolzanos mit Benutzung ungedruckter Quellen kritisch untersucht : Nebst einem Anhange: Bolzanos Beiträge zur philosophischen Grundlegung der Mathematik (1909)
- Das Unendliche und die Zahl (1913)
- Der Kampf um das Kausalgesetz in der juengsten Physik (1929)
- Maimon und Cohen (1939?)

== See also ==
- List of Israel Prize recipients
- List of German Jews
- List of Czech and Slovak Jews
- Bergmann
