= Hesham Issawi =

Egyptian American writer and director

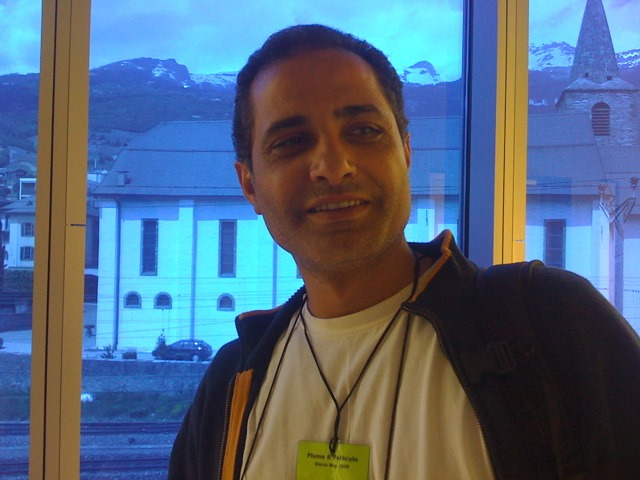
- Born: Egypt
- Occupations: Director, writer and producer
- Years active: 1995–present

Hesham Issawi (Arabic: هشام عيسوي) is an Egyptian American writer and director. He is best known for his work on the films AmericanEast and Cairo Exit.

== Life and career ==
Hesham was born in Egypt, and moved to the United States in 1990. He attended film school, Columbia College Chicago, and graduated in 1996. He began his career working at a local TV station as an editor and in the documentary world before directing a few short subjects of his own. He wrote and directed the 2004 short film, The Interrogation, which won best creative short film at the New York Film Festival and best music score at the California Film Festival. In 2005, he co-wrote and directed the short film, T for Terrorist, which won best short film at both the Boston and San Francisco Film Festivals.

Hesham's debut feature film, AmericanEast, about the plight of Middle Eastern people in America after 9/11, starred Sayed Badreya, Tony Shalhoub and Sarah Shahi. The movie was screened at the Dubai International Film Festival and won best picture at the Madrid Film Festival, 2008.

Hesham has lived between Cairo and Los Angeles since 2010. Believing in independent cinema, he decided to make Cairo Exit in his homeland. The movie was shot in Cairo with no permits due to the censorship rejecting the script. The film was screened at the Dubai International Film Festival, Tribeca Film Festival and many other festivals. The film won one future prize at the Filmfest München. It won prizes at Filmfest München and the European Independent film festival.

In 2015, he finished his latest film, The Price, which was screened at the Cairo International Film Festival and was released in Egyptian theater later.

== Filmography ==
Year	Title	Writer	Director	Producer	Notes
2002	Saving the Sphinx	✗	✗	✓	
2003	Saving Egyptian Film Classics	✓	✗	✗	
2004	The Interrogation	✓	✓	✓	Short film
2005	T for Terrorist	✓	✓	✓	Short film
2005	Mush	✗	✗	✓	Short film
2008	AmericanEast	✓	✓	✗	
2010	Cairo Exit	✓	✓	✗	
2014	Brother in Terror Documentary	✗	✗	✓	
2015	The Price	✗	✓	✗	
2019	High Fences	✓	✓	✗	Post-production

As editor

- 2003 - The Mole
- 2003 - Saving Egyptian Film Classics
- 2004 - The Interrogation
- 2005 - T for Terrorist
- 2005 - Voices of Iraq
- 2006 - Things You Don't Tell...
