= Michael Bergmann =

American filmmaker

- Born: United States
- Occupation(s): Writer, director, producer
- Parent: Martin S. Bergmann
- Relatives: Hugo Bergman (grandfather)

Michael Bergmann is an American writer, director, and producer.

== Biography ==
Michael Bergmann graduated with a B.A. in Latin from Columbia University in 1975 and studied film concurrently at N.Y.U. Undergraduate Film School. He went on to study at the N.Y.U. Graduate School of Film and Television. He is married to the sculptor Meredith Bergmann.

Bergmann is the son of two Freudian psychoanalysts and the grandson of Hugo Bergmann, a philosopher who was one of the founders of Hebrew University in Jerusalem. He is also the great-grandson of Berta Fanta, a Prague salonière whose circle included Franz Kafka and Max Brod.

== Filmography ==
Bergmann's films include:

- Milk & Money (1996) with Calista Flockhart, Margaret Colin, Marin Hinkle, Olympia Dukakis, Dina Merrill, Robert Vaughn and Peter Boyle
- Trifling With Fate (2000) with Bridget Moynahan, Gordon Elliott, Vivienne Benesch, Jason Butler Harner, Teri Lamm and Sarah Winkler
- In Bed with My Books (2002) (Short)
- Aftershock (2002) (Short) – Jury Award for Best Short Film, Whitehead International Film Festival
- The Reality Trap (2005) with Bonnie Loren, Kevin Stapleton and Hedy Burress
- Tied to a Chair (2009) with Bonnie Loren, Mario Van Peebles and Robert Gosset
- Influence (2015)

Bergmann wrote the libretto for Stefania de Kenessey's opera The Bonfire of the Vanities: The Opera, based on Tom Wolfe’s novel The Bonfire of the Vanities, and directed the premiere in New York on October 9, 2015.
