= The Bonfire of the Vanities: The Opera =

2015 opera composed by Stefania de Kenessey

The Bonfire of the Vanities: The Opera is an opera by the American composer Stefania de Kenessey and American librettist Michael Bergmann. The story is about ambitions and tensions in New York City in the 1980s and is based on the novel The Bonfire of the Vanities by Tom Wolfe. Kenessey said she wanted to make an opera in the vein of Carmen, depicting the urban upper classes in an operatic and satirical way.

Directed by Bergmann, the opera was first performed on El Museo del Barrio's El Teatro stage in New York City on October 9 and 10, 2015. The production starred Randal Turner, Kevin Maynor, Anne-Carolyn Bird, Yingjie Zhou and Adrienne Danrich.

James Jorden of The New York Observer wrote that the libretto suffers from including too many details from the novel. Jorden described the music as "tuneful and grateful to the voice" but wrote that it consists of "a series of short musical theater ditties", resulting in "neither art music nor compelling pop".
