= Libochovice =

Town in Ústí nad Labem Region, Czech Republic

- Town
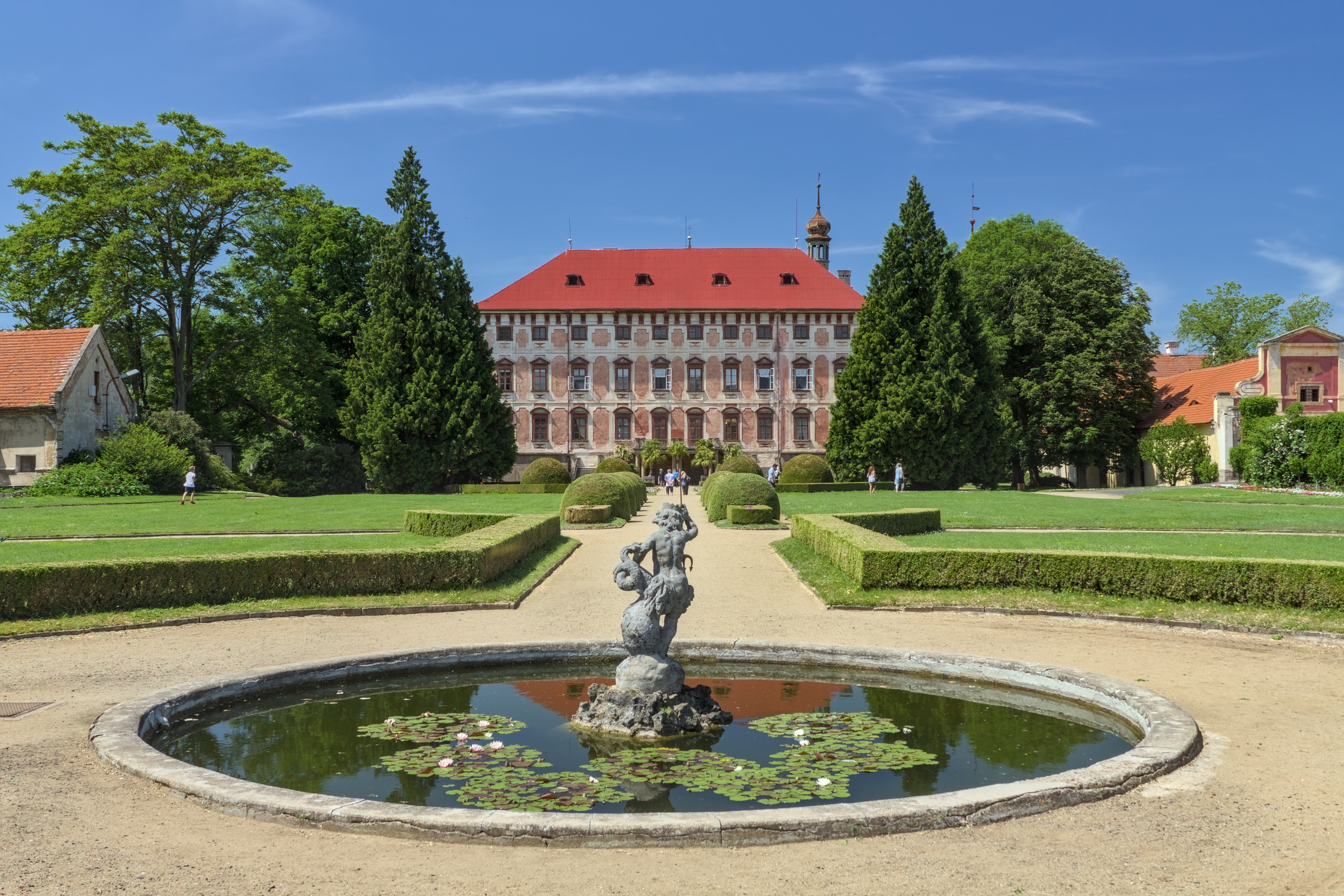
- Libochovice Castle

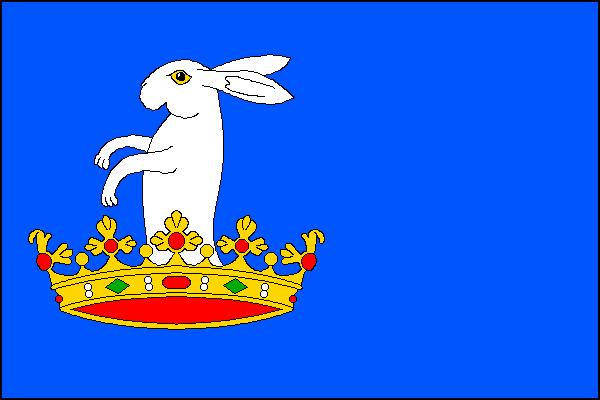
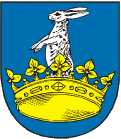
- Flag Coat of arms

- Location in the Czech Republic
- Coordinates: 50°24′31″N 14°2′30″E
- Country: Czech Republic
- Region: Ústí nad Labem
- District: Litoměřice
- First mentioned: 1336

Government
  - Mayor: Miroslav Zůna

Area
  - Total: 15.64 km^{2} (6.04 sq mi)
- Elevation: 166 m (545 ft)

Population (2026-01-01)
  - Total: 3,375
  - Density: 215.8/km^{2} (558.9/sq mi)
- Time zone: UTC+1 (CET)
  - Summer (DST): UTC+2 (CEST)
- Postal code: 411 17
- Website: www.libochovice.cz

Libochovice (Czech pronunciation: [ˈlɪboxovɪtsɛ]; German: Libochowitz) is a town in Litoměřice District in the Ústí nad Labem Region of the Czech Republic. It has about 3,400 inhabitants. The town is located on the Ohře River in the Lower Ohře Table. The main landmark is the Libochovice Castle, protected as a national cultural monument.

== Administrative division ==
Libochovice consists of three municipal parts (in brackets population according to the 2021 census):

- Libochovice (2,813)
- Dubany (189)
- Poplze (389)

== Etymology ==
The name is derived from the personal name Liboch (in old Czech known as Ľuboch), meaning "the village of Liboch's people".

== Geography ==
Libochovice is located about 15 kilometres (9 mi) south of Litoměřice and 28 km (17 mi) south of Ústí nad Labem. It lies in an agricultural landscape in the Lower Ohře Table. The Ohře River flows through the town.

== History ==
The first written mention of Libochovice is from 1336, when it was described as a market town with a fortress and when it was bought by Zbyněk Zajíc of Valdek, later known as Zbyněk Zajíc of Hazmburk. In 1424, during the Hussite Wars, Libochovice was completely destroyed and burned down. The settlement was restored in the second half of the 15th century and obtained various privileges from King Vladislaus II in 1507.

The Zajíc of Hazmburk family owned Libochovice until 1558, when they sold half of their Hazmburk estate to the Lobkowicz family. Libochovice subsequently became the centre of a newly created estate. In 1560, Libochovice became a town. After 1594, properties of Jiří of Lobkowicz were confiscated by the royal chamber. From 1613 to 1676, Libochovice was a property of the Sternberg family. In 1676, for economic reasons, they had to sell the estate to the Dietrichstein family. The Dietrichsteins owned Libochovice until 1858.

The first Jews came into the town probably in the second half of the 15th century. From the second half of the 16th century there was a large Jewish community, but most of the Jews died during the Holocaust, and the community was never restored after World War II.

== Demographics ==
Historical population

| Year | Pop. | ±% |
|---|---|---|
| 1869 | 2,577 | — |
| 1880 | 2,718 | +5.5% |
| 1890 | 2,785 | +2.5% |
| 1900 | 2,867 | +2.9% |
| 1910 | 3,049 | +6.3% |

| Year | Pop. | ±% |
|---|---|---|
| 1921 | 3,404 | +11.6% |
| 1930 | 3,575 | +5.0% |
| 1950 | 3,229 | −9.7% |
| 1961 | 3,377 | +4.6% |
| 1970 | 3,328 | −1.5% |

| Year | Pop. | ±% |
|---|---|---|
| 1980 | 3,512 | +5.5% |
| 1991 | 3,648 | +3.9% |
| 2001 | 3,677 | +0.8% |
| 2011 | 3,547 | −3.5% |
| 2021 | 3,391 | −4.4% |

Source: Censuses

== Transport ==
Libochovice is located on the railway lines Ústí nad Labem–Žatec and Česká Lípa–Postoloprty. The town is also the final station of the railway line from Roudnice nad Labem. Historic trains run on it and it is only in operation during the summer tourist season on weekends.

== Sights ==
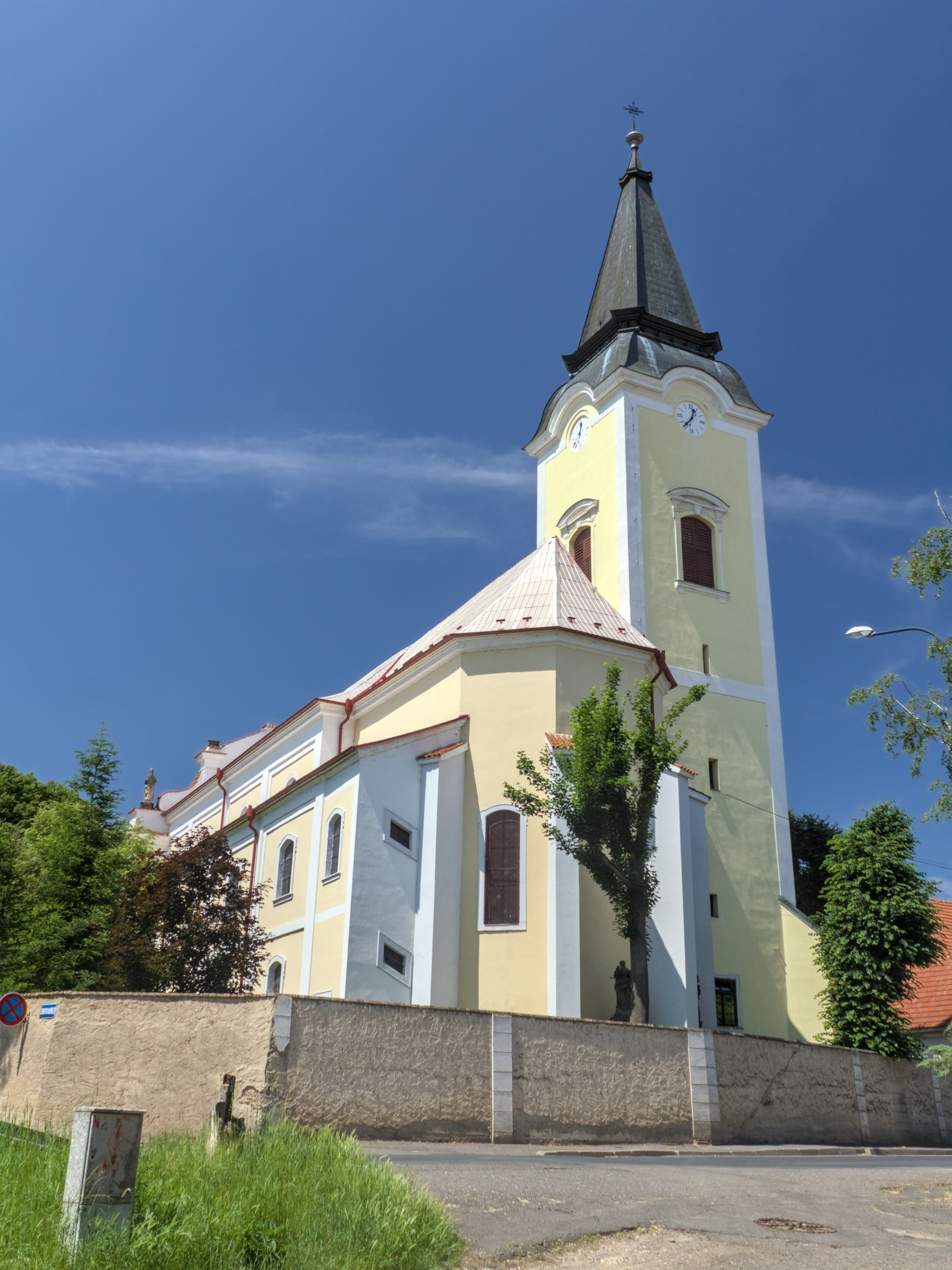
Church of All Saints

Libochovice is known for the Libochovice Castle. It was originally a Gothic fortress, rebuilt into a Renaissance castle in 1560–1564. In 1682–1690, the castle was extended and rebuilt in the early Baroque style according to the design by Antonio della Porta. The castle park was founded in 1686. Since then, the castle complex has remained in an almost unchanged form, thus preserving its high historical and architectural value. The castle is protected as a national cultural monument.

The Church of All Saints was originally a Gothic church from the 14th century. The tower was added in 1541. After it was destroyed by a fire in 1661, it was completely rebuilt in the Baroque style in 1700–1705.

The Jewish community is reminded of the cemetery, founded in 1583, and of part of the original houses of the Jewish quarter. The synagogue from the second half of the 18th century was demolished in 1985 and is commemorated by a memorial plaque.

== Notable people ==
- Jan Evangelista Purkyně (1787–1869), anatomist and physiologist
- Ábrahám Lederer (1827–1916), Czech-Hungarian educator and writer
- Berta Fanta (1865–1918), intellectual and feminist
- Eliška Purkyňová (1868–1933), politician
- Václav Vacek (1877–1960), writer and politician, Mayor of Prague
- Josef Kopta (1894–1962), writer and journalist
