= Eliška Purkyňová =

Czechoslovak politician (1868–1933)

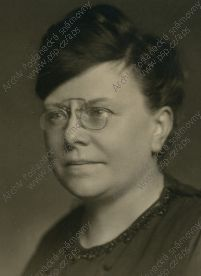

Member of the Chamber of Deputies
- In office 1920–1925

Personal details
- Born: 16 November 1868 Libochovice, Bohemia, Austria-Hungary
- Died: 22 October 1933 (aged 64) Prague, Czechoslovakia

Eliška Purkyňová (16 November 1868 – 22 October 1933) was a Czechoslovak politician. In 1920, she was one of the first group of women elected to the Chamber of Deputies.

== Biography ==
Purkyňová was born Alžběta Josefa Čapková in Libochovice in 1868. In 1915, she became head of the Central Association of Czech Women, and was a member of the bord of trustees of the Reform Gymnasium in Vinohrady. Following the independence of Czechoslovakia at the end of World War I, she began working for the Ministry of Social Welfare.

Having briefly served in the Revolutionary National Assembly in 1920 as a replacement for František Malínský, Purkyňová was a Czechoslovak National Democracy (CND) candidate for the Chamber of Deputies in the 1920 parliamentary elections, and was one of sixteen women elected to parliament. After being elected, she served as vice-chair of the Bohemian provincial branch of the CND. She initiated the construction of an elderly care home in Prague (today the Eliška Purkyňová Home for the Elderly), which she became the first director of in 1924. In 1923 she became a member of the initial board of the Little Entente of Women. She left parliament in 1925 after a single term in office.

She died in Prague in 1933.
