= Robert Gossett =

American actor (born 1954)

- Born: March 3, 1954 (age 72)
- Occupation: Actor
- Years active: 1984–present
- Relatives: Louis Gossett Jr. (first cousin)

Robert Gossett (born March 3, 1954) is an American actor. He is best known for his role of Commander Russell Taylor on the TNT crime drama The Closer and on its successor series Major Crimes.

== Career ==
Gossett landed his first professional job after he graduated from high school in a production of One Flew Over the Cuckoo's Nest. He went on to act in a Broadway production of August Wilson's Fences directed by Lloyd Richards, as well as Hal Scott's A Raisin in the Sun and Donald McKayle's The Last Minstrel Show. He also performed in the Negro Ensemble Company's productions of Manhattan Made Me, Sons & Fathers of Sons, A Soldier's Play and Colored People's Time.He also performed in the Negro Ensemble Company's productions of Manhattan Made Me, Sons and Fathers of Sons, A Soldier's Play, and Colored People's Time. He has extensive television experience with guest-starring roles on Crossing Jordan, NYPD Blue, and Black Angel. In film, Gossett appeared in the Jeff Bridges/Tim Robbins film Arlington Road and the Sandra Bullock movie The Net.

On the October 18, 2021, episode of the ABC daytime drama General Hospital, Gossett made his debut as a mysterious man taking a special interest in former private eye and present club owner Curtis Ashford. This character was subsequently revealed to be Curtis' long lost dad, Marshall Ashford, a character with schizophrenia.

== Personal life ==
Gossett is a first cousin of actor Louis Gossett Jr.

== Filmography ==
=== Film ===
Year	Title	Role	Notes
1984	Over the Brooklyn Bridge	Eddie	
1992	Batman Returns	TV Anchorman	
1995	White Man's Burden	John	
1995	The Net	Ben Phillips	
1995	Phoenix	Barker	
1997	The Maker	Partner	
1999	Arlington Road	FBI Agent Whit Carver	
1999	Jimmy Zip	Horace Metcalf	
1999	The Living Witness	Phil Jackson	
2002	Devious Beings	Damone	
2005	The Inner Circle	Leo	
2009	Flying By	Michael	
2011	Tied to a Chair	Detective Peter Farrell	
2014	Revelation Road: The Black Rider	The Shepherd	
2018	How To Get Rid Of A Body (and still be friends)	Mr. Morris	

=== Television ===
Year	Title	Role	Notes
1987	The Cosby Show	Stage Manager	Episode: "Dance Mania"
1988	Heartbeat	Dixon	2 episodes
1990	Quantum Leap	Charles Griffin	Episode: "Pool Hall Blues - September 4, 1954"
1992	Cheers	Customer #3	Episode: "License to Hill"
1992	Hangin' with Mr. Cooper	John Lee	Episode: "Miracle in Oaktown"
1992	Silk Stalkings	Lt. Hudson	Main role
1993	NYPD Blue	Lonnie Edwards	Episode: "Oscar, Meyer, Wiener"
1995	Melrose Place	Detective Smith	Episode: "Two Flew Over the Cuckoo's Nest"
1995	Diagnosis Murder	Dr. Max Frye	Episode: "My Baby is Out of This World"
1996	Diagnosis Murder	Jimmy Christopher	Episode: "The Murder Trade"
1996	Second Noah	Lyle	Episode: "Dreamboat"
1996	Touched by an Angel	Paul Stettling	Episode: "The Journalist"
1997	Promised Land	Robert Dixon	2 episodes
1997	Pacific Palisades	Adam Winfield	4 episodes
1997	Alien Nation: The Udara Legacy	Cummings	TV film
1997	Beverly Hills, 90210	Detective Woods	4 episodes
1997	7th Heaven	Doctor	Episode: "Do Something"
1998	Sister, Sister	Eddie	Episode: "The Domino Effect"
1999	Working	Executive Storyteller #1	Episode: "Romeo and Juliet"
1999	Charmed	Mr. Franklin	Episode: "Secrets and Guys"
2000	That's Life	Photography Professor	2 episodes
2000	Dark Angel	James McGinnis	4 episodes
2001	Judging Amy	Dan Matson	Episode: "Everybody Falls Down"
2001	Yes, Dear	John	Episode: "Mr. Fix It"
2001–2004	Passions	Woody Stumper	Recurring role
2002	Philly	Malik Clay	2 episodes
2003	Dragnet	Howard Sykes	Episode: "The Big Ruckus"
2003	NYPD Blue	Ken Gross	Episode: "Only Schmucks Pay Income Tax"
2004	Crossing Jordan	Jack Hayes	Episode: "Most Likely"
2005-2012	The Closer	Commander Russell Taylor	Main role
2005	Bones	Mr. Taylor	Episode: "The Man in the Wall"
2007	The Young and the Restless	Incident Commander	3 episodes
2008	ER	Dr. Everett Daniels	2 episodes
2010	The Sarah Silverman Program	Judge Willie Joe Blackwell	Episode: "A Slip Slope"
2012-2017	Major Crimes	Assistant Chief Russell Taylor	Main role
2016	Chicago Med	Reggie Dixon	Episode: "Inherent Bias"
2018	The Oath	Charles Ryder	Recurring role
2018	Greenleaf	District Attorney Price	3 episodes
2019	The Enemy Within	Thomas Heffron	3 episodes
2021–present	General Hospital	Marshall Ashford	

== Awards and nominations ==
- NAACP Theater Award for Best Performance by a Male, Indigo Blues (1993)
- Dramalogue Best Actor Award, Indigo Blues (1993)
- LA Weekly Theater Award, Washington Square Moves (1995)
- Dramalogue Best Actor Award, Washington Square Moves (1995)
- Daytime Emmy Award nomination for Outstanding Guest Performance in a Drama Series, General Hospital (2022)
- Daytime Emmy Award for Outstanding Supporting Actor in a Drama Series, General Hospital (2023)
- Daytime Emmy Award for Outstanding Supporting Actor in a Drama Series, General Hospital (2024)
