= Chopper One =

American television series

- Genre: Police procedural Action
- Created by: Ronald Austin; James David Buchanan
- Starring: Jim McMullan; Dirk Benedict; Ted Hartley; Lou Frizzell
- Theme music composer: Dominic Frontiere
- Country of origin: United States
- Original language: English
- No. of seasons: 1
- No. of episodes: 13

Production
- Executive producers: Aaron Spelling; Leonard Goldberg
- Producers: Ronald Austin; J. D. Buchanan
- Running time: 25 minutes
- Production company: Spelling-Goldberg Productions

Original release
- Network: ABC
- Release: January 17 – April 11, 1974

Chopper One is an ABC action-crime television series premiering in early 1974, depicting the activities of a fictional California police helicopter team. The program was produced by television powerhouse Spelling-Goldberg Productions. The series aired in a half-hour time slot on Thursdays at 8 p.m. Eastern.

The show aired as a lead-in to Firehouse, an action-drama series about a Los Angeles fire station which premiered on the same day. Chopper One was cancelled after six months with Firehouse promptly ending the following month.

== Story and characters ==
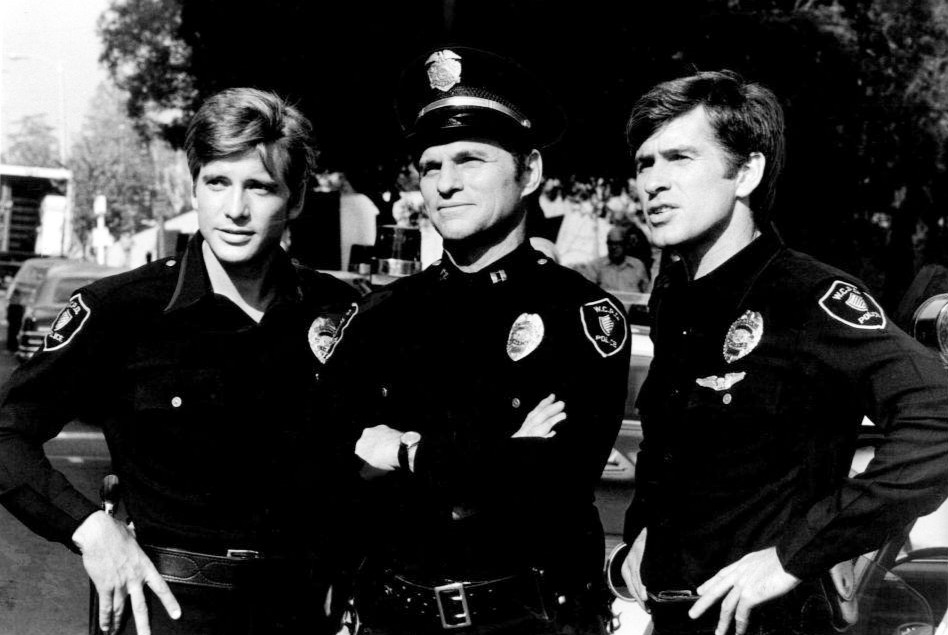
From left; Dirk Benedict, Ted Hartley and Jim McMullan.

Chopper One was directed by E.W. Swackhamer, featuring two flight police officers (a pilot and an observer) and their adventures in a police helicopter. The helicopter was a Bell 206 JetRanger. It starred Jim McMullan as Officer Don Burdick and Dirk Benedict as Officer Gil Foley. Benedict would later earn fame as Lt. Starbuck in the original 1978 TV show Battlestar Galactica and as Lt. Templeton 'Faceman' Peck in the TV show The A-Team.

Ted Hartley played their boss Capt. McKeegan and Lou Frizzell played Mitch, the crusty mechanic.

=== Helicopters used ===
Two helicopters were used to represent Chopper One. They were Bell model 206 JetRangers, tail numbers N209D and N40MC. Various add-ons depicted in the show included an extended-range fuel tank and an external 100-gallon water tank.

In a precursor to a feature of the titular helicopter in Blue Thunder, later episodes depicted a fictional "muffler" switch that reduced the sound of the helicopter while in flight.

N209D was a Bell 206A, built in 1968. Records show the aircraft was destroyed in a forced landing on February 20, 1975, in Bolivia. The registered owner was listed as Briles Wing & Helicopter.

N40MC is a Bell 206B, built in 1970, and as of 2026 is registered to an operator in Minnesota.

== Episodes ==
No.	Title	Directed by	Written by	Original release date
1	"Pilot"	Harry Falk	Ronald Austin and James David Buchanan	January 17, 1974
Burdick and Foley pursue a pair of gunmen who have taken a woman hostage.
2	"Strain of Innocence"	E. W. Swackhamer	Robert I. Holt	January 24, 1974
A girl who is being held in a holdup goes into labor and gives birth as the helicopter rushes her to the hospital.
3	"The Bust-Out"	Phil Bondelli	Don Balluck	January 31, 1974
The chopper is commandeered at gunpoint when Foley and Burdick answer an emergency call.
4	"The Boy Who Cried Wolf"	Bruce Bilson	Sy Salkowitz	February 7, 1974
A young invalid ham radio operator disrupts the department with false emergency calls.
5	"The Informer"	Phil Bondelli	Jon Sevorg	February 14, 1974
The crew is called upon to help protect a former underworld figure who is about to testify against the crime kingpin he worked for.
6	"The Drop"	Phil Bondelli	Don Balluck	February 21, 1974
Burdick parachutes onto a mountainside in an attempt to rescue a young girl who has been kidnapped.
7	"Ambush"	E. W. Swackhamer	Ronald Austin & James D. Buchanan	February 28, 1974
Foley and Burdick are menaced by rooftop snipers when a gunman sets out to avenge his brother's death.
8	"The Copperhead"	Phil Bondelli	Dan Ullman	March 7, 1974
Foley and Burdick investigate a veteran police sergeant suspected of selling confiscated guns.
9	"Killing Time"	Richard Newton	John T. Dugan	March 14, 1974
The wife of the chopper mechanic is held hostage by assassins who are planning the murder of a gubernatorial candidate, and want to keep the police copter on the ground.
10	"Deadly Carrier"	Lawrence Dobkin	Ronald Austin & James D. Buchanan	March 21, 1974
An illegal alien suspected of carrying typhoid fever is the object of a desperate search by Foley and Burdick.
11	"The Scramble"	Seymour Robbie	Don Balluck	March 28, 1974
Clues to a series of market robberies are found at a scramble when Foley goes undercover as a bike racer.
12	"Downtime"	Richard Newton	Ronald Austin and James David Buchanan	April 4, 1974
Burdick and Foley search frantically for a hidden bomb with thousands of lives at stake.
13	"The Hijacking"	John Peyser	Robert I. Holt	April 11, 1974
Hijackers of a gasoline truck are sought by Burdick and Foley.

== Home media and streaming services ==
Since its cancellation in 1974, Chopper One was reported to have rarely (if ever) been seen again in rerun syndication.

On July 12, 2016, Sony Pictures released Chopper One: The Complete Series on DVD in Region 1. This is a Manufacture-on-Demand (MOD) release, available exclusively in the US and is part of the Sony Pictures Choice Collection in partnership with Amazon.com and their CreateSpace MOD program.

As of 2023, all 13 episodes of Chopper One are available on free video streaming service Crackle.
