= Martin S. Bergmann =

American psychologist

- Born: February 15, 1913
- Died: January 22, 2014 (aged 100); New York City, United States
- Occupation: Professor of psychology
- Children: Michael Bergmann
- Parent: Hugo Bergmann

Martin S. Bergmann (February 15, 1913 – January 22, 2014) was a clinical professor of psychology of the New York University post-doctoral program where he taught the course on the history of psychoanalysis. He was a major voice in the post-Freudian analysis and authored books on human conditions like the Holocaust, the phenomenology of love and child sacrifice. He was a member of the International Psychoanalytical Association and an honorary member of the American Psychoanalytic Association.

== Family ==
He was the son of Hugo Bergmann, a Prague-born Israeli philosopher, and father of Michael Bergmann.

== On film ==
Bergmann contributed to the documentaries "The Century of the Self" (2002) by Adam Curtis and Young Dr. Freud by David Grubin. He appeared as Prof. Louis Levy in Woody Allen's 1989 feature Crimes and Misdemeanors, and played SS NCO Zablocie in Schindler's List.

- Crimes and Misdemeanors (1989) - Professor Louis Levy
- Schindler's List (1993) - SS NCO Zablocie

== Death ==
Bergmann died on January 22, 2014, aged 100.

== Partial bibliography ==
- The Anatomy of Loving: The Story of Man's Quest to Know What Love Is (1987), Ballantine Books ISBN 978-0449905531
- Generations of the Holocaust (1991), Columbia Univ. Press, ISBN 978-0231074230
- In the Shadow of Moloch (1992), Columbia University Press ISBN 978-0231072489
- What Silent Love Hath Writ: A Psychoanalytic Exploration of Shakespeare's Sonnets (with his son Michael Bergmann, 2008), Separate Star, ISBN 978-0971287242
- Understanding Dissidence and Controversy in the History of Psychoanalysis (2004), Other Press ISBN 978-1590511176
- "The Unconscious in Shakespeare's Plays" (2013), Karnac ISBN 978-1780491561
