= Tied to a Chair =

- Directed by: Michael Bergmann
- Written by: Michael Bergmann
- Produced by: Michael Bergmann
- Starring: Mario Van Peebles; Bonnie Loren; Robert Gossett; Sayed Badreya
- Cinematography: Douglas Underdahl
- Edited by: Jonathan Sloman
- Music by: Deborah Mollison
- Production company: Gotschna Ventures
- Distributed by: Process Studio Theater
- Release date: May 27, 2011 (Manhattan)
- Running time: 95 minutes
- Countries: United States; United Kingdom; France
- Language: English

Tied to a Chair is a 2011 American-French-British comedy film written and directed by Michael Bergmann and starring Mario Van Peebles, Bonnie Loren, Robert Gossett and Sayed Badreya.

== Cast ==
- Bonnie Loren as Naomi Holbroke
- Mario Van Peebles as Billy Rust
- Robert Gossett as Det. Peter Farrell
- Richard Franklin as Henry Holbroke
- Sayed Badreya as Kamal
- Ali Marsh as Liz
- Joselin Reyes as Detective Rosalie Aragon

== Release ==
The film premiered in Manhattan on May 27, 2011.

== Reception ==
The film has a 0% rating on Rotten Tomatoes based on five reviews.

Jeannette Catsoulis of The New York Times gave the film a negative review and wrote, "Insulting several nationalities and most of the filmgoing public, Tied to a Chair lurches through acting atrocities, continuity glitches and narrative gaps with grating insouciance."

Diego Semerene of Slant Magazine awarded the film one and a half stars out of four and wrote that it "mostly suffers from a sense of confusion that never reads like bona fide experimentalism, just aimlessness."
