= Ábrahám Lederer =

Czech-Hungarian writer (1827–1916)

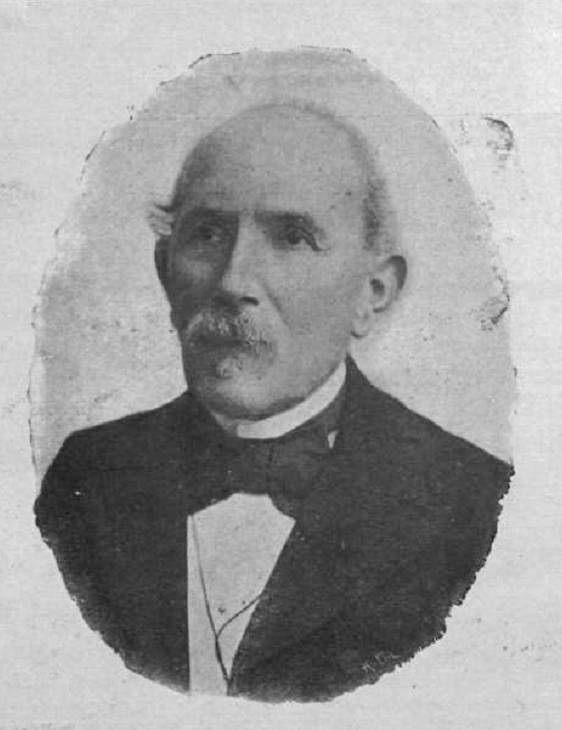
Image of Abraham Lederer

Abraham Lederer (Hungarian: Lederer Ábrahám, Léderer Ábrahám; January 9, 1827, Libochovice, Bohemia – September 17, 1916, Budapest) was an educator and writer in Austria-Hungary.

== Life ==
He was born in Libochovice, Bohemia. In 1840 he went to Prague, where he studied at the Teachers' Seminary and at the university.

In 1853 he taught at Břeclav, Moravia and in 1854 he accepted the post of director of the Jewish school at Tata, Hungary, whence he was called to the Israelitische Musterschule in 1857, becoming in the following year director of the Israelitic Teachers' Seminary at Budapest.

Lederer contributed much to pedagogics in general, and to the training of Jewish teachers in Hungary in particular. He was the founder and organizer of the Jewish normal school ("Landes-Präparandie"), of the Jewish National Teachers' Association, of the national pedagogical museum, of the Women's Industrial Association, and of the vacation colony for children. In 1869 the government commissioned him to translate Hungarian text-books into German, and appointed him director of the state seminaries and a member of the supreme board of education.

== Literary works ==
Of his works the following are noteworthy:

- "Heimathskunde" (Pest, 1859)
- "Erziehungslehre für Israelitische Eltern und Lehrer" (ib. 1865)
- "Leitfaden und Lesebuch für Lehrer" (ib. 1870)
- "Methodischer Leitfaden zum Deutschen Sprachunterricht" (Budapest, 1873)
- "Társadalmi Pädagogia" (ib. 1885), on social pedagogics
- "Hires Emberek Ismertető Jelei" ("Charakteristiken Berühmter Männer," 1896)
- "A Testi Büntetés Lélektana" (1901), on the psychology of corporal punishment
- "Iskolai Kirándulás a Csillagos Egbe" (1903), a guide to instruction in astronomy in schools
