= Cairo Exit =

- Directed by: Hesham Issawi
- Screenplay by: Hesham Issawi; Amal Afify
- Story by: Hesham Issawi; Alexandra Kinias
- Produced by: Sherif Mandour
- Cinematography: Patrik Thelander
- Edited by: Nehad Samey
- Music by: Tamer Karawan
- Release date: December 17, 2010 (Dubai)
- Country: Egypt
- Language: Arabic

Cairo Exit (El Khoroug) is a feature-length film directed by Hesham Issawi whose production started in Cairo, Egypt, in 2010.

== Plot ==
The main character and the main focal of the story is Amal Iskander a poor 18-year-old Coptic Egyptian girl. Her Muslim boyfriend Tarek is planning to leave Egypt on an illegal boat-crossing to Italy. Amal tells Tarek she is pregnant but he gives her an ultimatum - abandon the country with him, or have an abortion.

Amal, who loves Tarek and wants the baby, rejects both choices. But when the battered scooter she uses for food deliveries is stolen. Amal is fired from her job and suddenly finds herself with even fewer options. Her future, limited from the start, looks even more uncertain. In the poor neighborhood of Bashtel where Amal lives with her mother and a stepfather who is a compulsive gambler, day-to-day existence is difficult for everyone. Her sister, Hanan, is also an unwed mother with few paths to a better life.

Her best friend, Rania, is trying to raise money for an operation that will disguise the fact that she is no longer a virgin so that she can marry a wealthy, older man whom she does not love. Amal seeks guidance in prayers to the Virgin Mary, but with few real possibilities left, she takes the only job she can find - in a hairdresser with low pay. The new job opens up the underworld life within Cairo that Amal never imagined - a life of luxury, leisure, expensive homes and cars - but also one of vice. At one of her destinations, a high class brothel in an exclusive part of town, she discovers her sister Hanan working as a prostitute in order to support her child. Devastated, disgusted by the life of the underworld, she gives up her only possibility for self-sufficiency.

Neither desiring a loveless marriage like Rania's, nor wishing to end up destitute like her mother and sister, Amal decides that she must abandon her family and their difficult existence in Egypt to join the man she loves and take the risky journey across the sea to another life.

== Cast ==
- Maryhan as Amal
- Mohamed Ramadan as Tarek
- Sana Mouziane as Rania
- Ahmed Bidar as Nagib
- Safa'a Galal as Hanan
- Mohamed Goma as Mahmoud
- Nadia Fahmy as Amal's mother
- Abdul Rahman Masry as Samir
- Kamal Attia as Meena
- Mohamed El Sawy as Abdo
- Nabil El-Hagrassy as Farid - Restaurant owner
- Madgy El Sebay as Restaurant chef
- Ismail Farouk as Gameel Ashry - Marriage councilor
- Maha Osman as Madam Mervat
- Eman Lotfy as Nagwa
- Awatef Helmy as Rania's mother
- Hossam El-Sherbiny as Doctor Samah
- Fifi Mansour as Tarek's mother
- Attia as Rania's father
