= Sana Mouziane =

Moroccan actress and singer (born 1980)

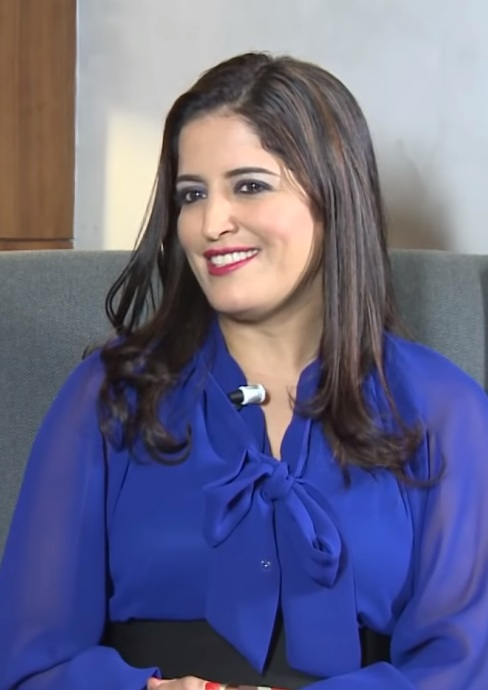
- Sana Mouziane talks to ZOOM7 TV, 28 April 2015
- Born: 1980 (age 45–46); Casablanca
- Occupations: Actress, singer
- Spouse: engineer Alan Dearsley
- Children: 1

Sana Mouziane (born 1980) is a Moroccan actress and singer.

== Biography ==
Mouziane was born in Casablanca. When her parents divorced, she moved to Marrakesh. Mouziane moved to London at the age of nine. She took music lessons and decided to join a music group to enter in competitions. At age 17, Mouziane delivered her first public singing in Arabic at the Darlington International Festival. She stated that her life in England has given her a balance between Western culture and Eastern education which allows her to live her life to the fullest.

Mouziane released her debut single "Inta Lhoub" in 2004. Mouziane made her film debut in 2005, in Women in Search of Freedom directed by the Egyptian director Ines Al Dégheidi. The film deals with women living in exile and became a success in the Arab world, winning several awards at film festivals. The following year, she appeared in Ashra Haramy. In 2007, Mouziane portrayed a woman engaging in an adulterous relationship with her husband's nephew in Samira's Garden. She won best actress for this role at the Panafrican Film and Television Festival of Ouagadougou in 2009. In 2012, Mouziane played Zahra, the wife of the sheikh, in the historical drama L'enfant cheikh directed by Hamid Bennani. She called it a new experience, working on a film set during the French colonization. She played Martha, who discovers the risen Jesus, in the 2013 miniseries The Bible. In 2017, Mouziane starred in La Nuit Ardente, directed by Bennani. She said she likes to take on daring roles.

Mouziane married the British engineer Alan Dearsley on 14 February 2013. According to her, it was love at first sight, as he was interested in her cultural background. The couple took their honeymoon in the Maldives. She gave birth to a son, Kenzi, in 2014 and took a break from acting.

== Filmography ==
- 2005: Women in Search of Freedom
- 2006: Ashra Haramy
- 2007: Samira's Garden
- 2008: Cut Loose
- 2010: Cairo Exit
- 2012: L'enfant cheikh
- 2013: The Bible (TV series)
- 2014: L'anniversaire
- 2014: Son of God
- 2017: La Nuit Ardente
