= Randal Turner =

American operatic baritone

Randal Turner is an American operatic baritone.

== Early years and training ==
Randal Turner was born and raised on a farm near Crawfordsville, Indiana. After studying music and ballet at the Interlochen Arts Academy in Michigan, studied voice at Oberlin and at Indiana University School of Music. He also studied at the International Opera Studio in Zürich.

== Opera career ==
Turner sang the role of Stanley Kowalski in the Italian premiere of A Streetcar Named Desire at the Teatro Regio di Torino in 2003. He has performed in several other European opera houses, including: Opernhaus Zürich, Stadttheater St. Gallen, Landestheater Linz, Vienna Kammeroper, Opéra de Monte-Carlo, Stadttheater Bielefeld, Staatstheater Darmstadt, Opera di Roma, and the Manoel Theatre in Malta.

Turner made his American debut in 2010 as Don Giovanni with Michigan Opera Theater. In 2015, he sang the role of Sherman McCoy in the premiere of The Bonfire of the Vanities: The Opera, based on Tom Wolfe's novel with the same name.

== Discography ==
- Living American Composers (2011)
