= Libochovice Castle =

Coordinates: 50°24′31″N 14°2′30″E

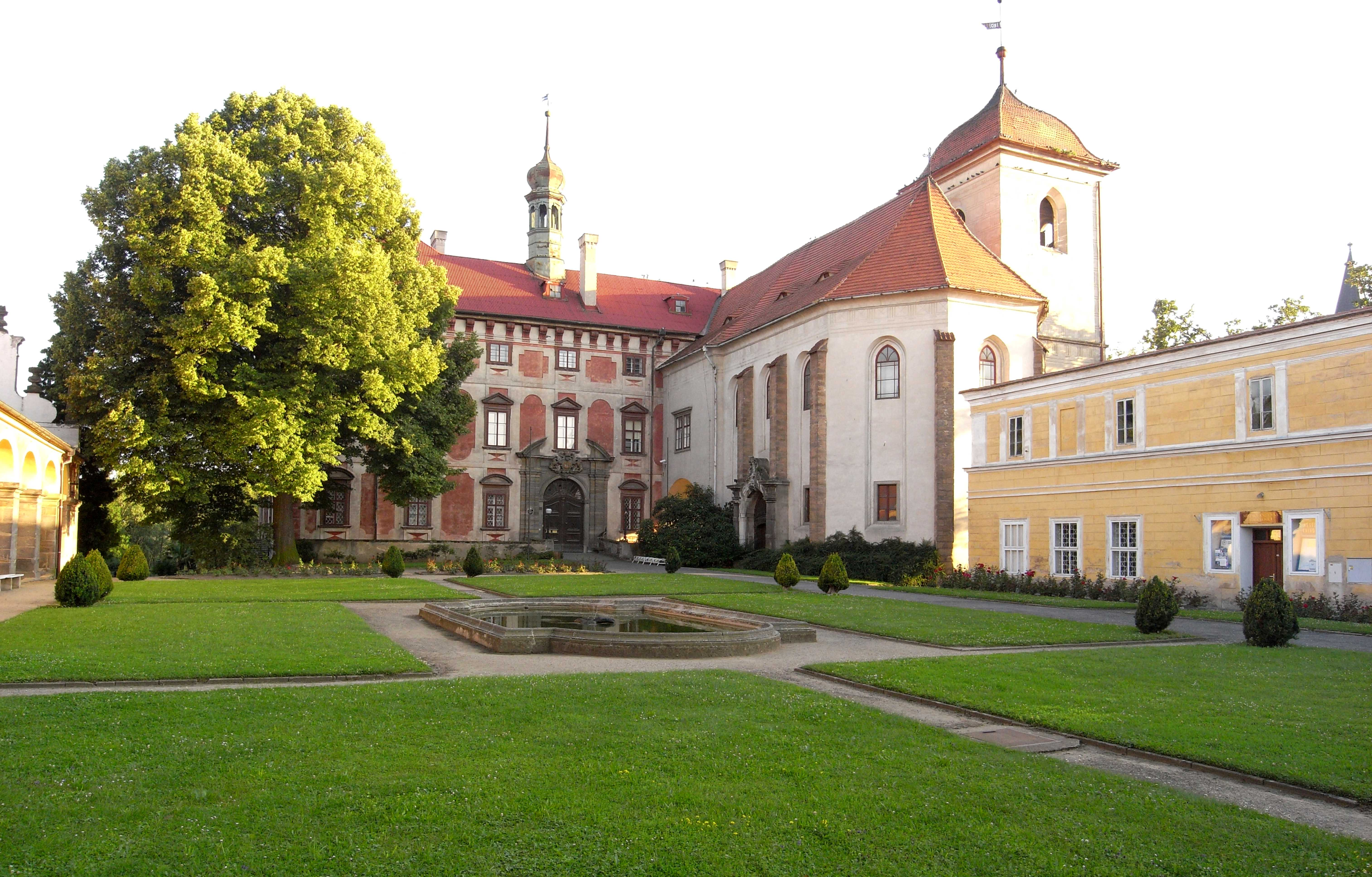
Main entrance and the castle chapel

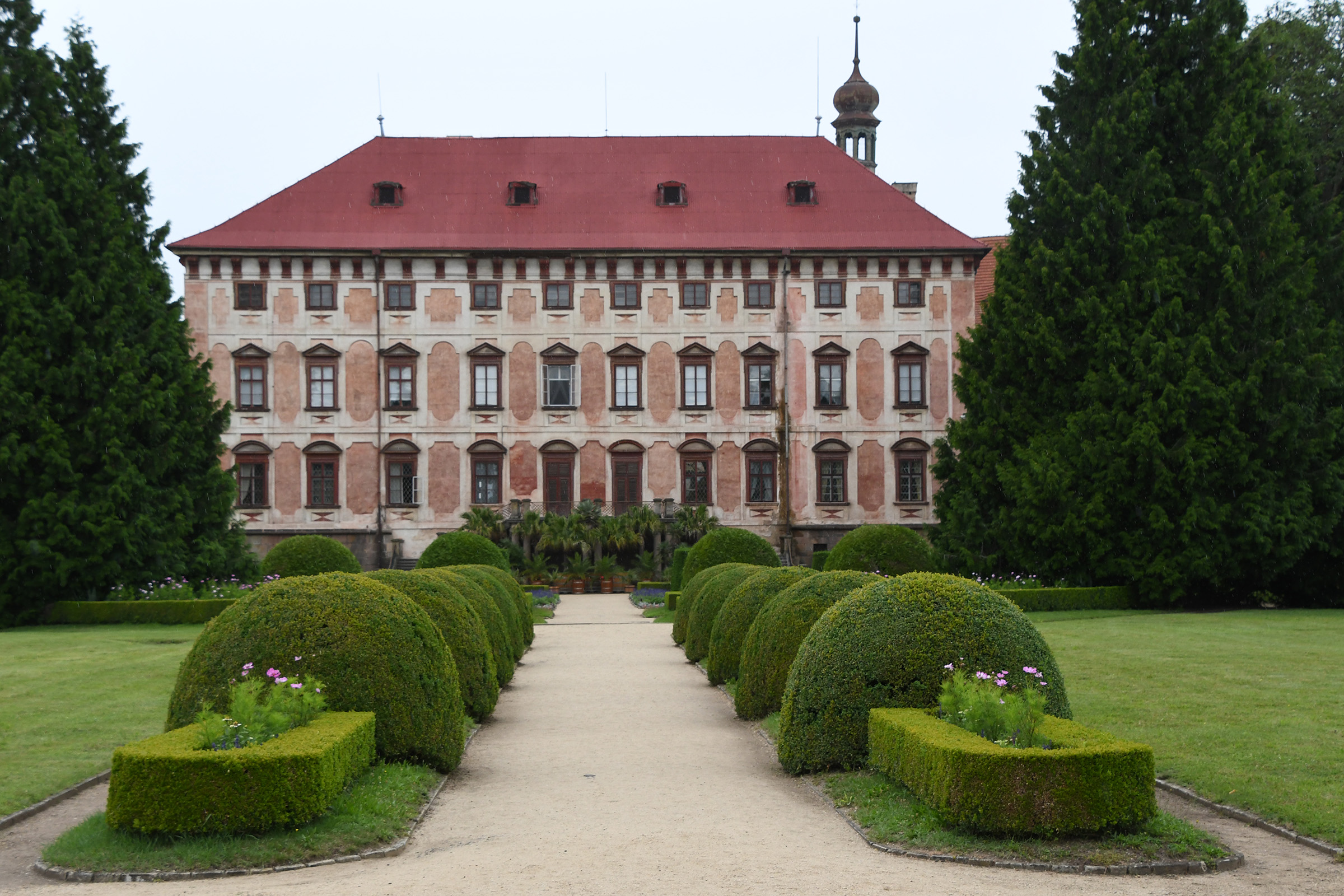
View from the garden

Libochovice Castle (Czech: zámek Libochovice) is a castle in the centre of Libochovice town in the Ústí nad Labem Region of the Czech Republic. It is one of the most significant early Baroque castles in the country. For its value, it is protected as a national cultural monument.

Today the castle is owned by the state and offers guided tours. The castle boasts with the collections of tapestries, glass and porcelain.

In 1787, Jan Evangelista Purkyně, a major Czech scientist and a scholar, was born in Libochovice Castle.

== History ==
During the Gothic period, there was a fortress at the place of recent castle, and at the year 1550 was listed as deserted. In 1560, the ruins were rebuilt into a castle.

In the 17th century, one hundred years after Libochovice was declared the town by Ferdinand I, there was a huge fire, which destroyed almost half of the town. However, it was not for the first time. The town underwent three fires altogether, during which also Libochovice Castle was severely damaged.

The current image of the castle comes from the 17th century, when it was bought by Gundakar, Prince of Dietrichstein (1623–1690). He asked Italian architect Antonio della Porta to restore it. Therefore, the Italian influence is evident. Antonio della Porta renewed this castle between 1683 and 1690, economic buildings were restored between 1690 and 1697.

Next renewing of castle was between 1900 and 1914 by E. Fiala.

The park was designed in French style by Jan Tulipán. During the 19th century, it was re-designed in English style and later restored again in the original design.

== Description ==
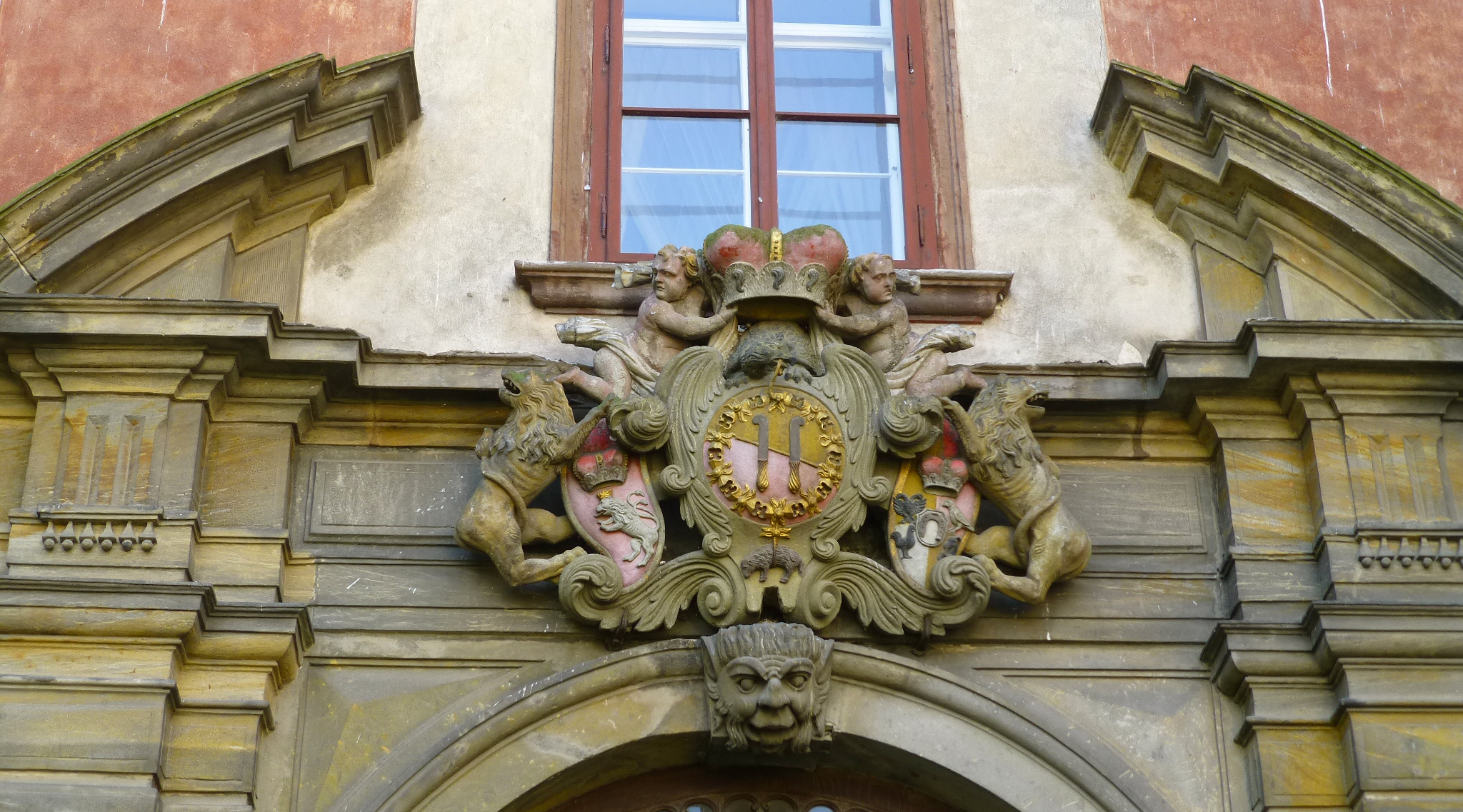
Portal with the coats of arms of the Dietrichstein family

The castle has four wings and is surrounded by arcades lining the courtyard. The yard is accessible from the entrance gate and leads to the Italian symmetrical garden. There are also four fountains in the garden by stonemason Jakub Mitthofer.

On the east side of the building, there is a balcony with columns and stairs leading to the garden that was built up in the middle of the 19th century. From the north side, the portal of the castle with a Dietrichstein blazon is visible.

In the courtyard there are embosses with the theme of the sea creatures made by Italian artists Jacob Tencalla and Giuseppe Mattoni. Italian embosses and mythological paintings can be found inside the castle as well.
