= Milk & Money =

1996 film by Michael Bergmann

- Directed by: Michael Bergmann
- Written by: Michael Bergmann
- Produced by: Michael Bergmann; Ted Hartley
- Starring: Robert Petkoff; Calista Flockhart; Dina Merrill; Robert Vaughn; Olympia Dukakis; Peter Boyle
- Cinematography: Ireneusz Hartowicz
- Edited by: Michael Bergmann; Tom Paterson
- Production company: Blue Dolphin Productions
- Distributed by: RKO Pictures
- Release date: October 19, 1996 (Hamptons)
- Running time: 86 minutes
- Country: United States
- Language: English

Milk & Money is a 1996 American romantic comedy film written and directed by Michael Bergmann and starring Robert Petkoff and Calista Flockhart. Ted Hartley and Dina Merrill, who also appear in the film, served as producer and executive producer respectively.

== Synopsis ==
David drops out of medical school and learns what life isn't really like. He meets beautiful women, helps make a film and takes care of twenty-one cows.

== Cast ==
- Robert Petkoff as David
- Calista Flockhart as Christine
- Peter Boyle as Belted Galloway
- Robert Vaughn as Uncle Andre
- Dina Merrill as Ellen, David's Mother
- Robert Stattel as David's Father
- Marin Hinkle as Carla
- Denise Faye as Kimberly
- Sarah Winkler as Nancy
- Margaret Colin as Lorraine
- Rob Gerlach as Julius
- Daniel Zelman as Josh
- Peter Frechette as Bookstore Clerk
- Olympia Dukakis as Goneril Plogg
- Carol Holmes as Kimberly's Mother
- Harsh Nayyar as Hot Dog Vendor
- Ted Hartley as Lingerie Salesman
- Helen Holstein as herself
