= Ted Hartley =

American actor and businessman (1924–2025)

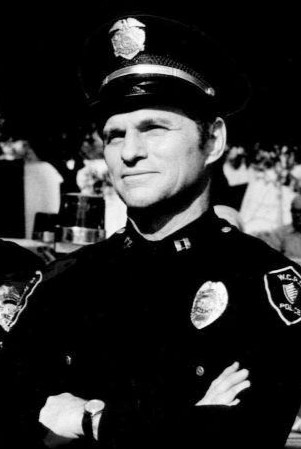
- Hartley in Chopper One, 1974.
- Born: Theodore Ringwalt Hartley; November 6, 1924; Omaha, Nebraska, U.S.
- Died: October 10, 2025 (aged 100); New York City, U.S.
- Education: U.S. Naval Academy; Harvard Business School
- Occupations: Fighter pilot, actor, businessman, film and stage producer
- Years active: c. 1951–2015
- Spouse: Dina Merrill (m. 1989; died 2017)

Theodore Ringwalt Hartley (November 6, 1924 – October 10, 2025) was an American U.S. Navy fighter pilot, investment banker, actor, film and stage producer, and CEO of RKO Pictures. His last acting credit was in 2012, and his last producing credit was in 2015.

== Early life ==
Hartley was born in Omaha, Nebraska, on November 6, 1924, to Dorothy Ringwalt and Eugene Hartley. He attended Shattuck Military School in Minnesota, and by the age of 16, he had won an appointment to the U.S. Naval Academy. After flight training, among other tours, he served as a carrier-based fighter pilot, flying F-11s following their introduction in 1956.

== Career ==
As a Navy officer, Hartley had tours as a congressional liaison for the Pentagon and as a Presidential aide, as well as a carrier-based fighter pilot. In May 1964, his F9F8 fighter crashed during a carrier landing. He was thrown from the jet, suffered a broken back, and was medically retired from the Navy. After Hartley's military career prematurely ended, he attended Harvard Business School and pursued a career in investment banking, becoming vice president for First Western Financial Corporation. His next career was in Hollywood, as an actor, where he took on the role of Reverend Jerry Bedford on the 1960s television series Peyton Place. Hartley had featured roles in films with Cary Grant, Robert Redford, and Clint Eastwood, and then in the mid-1970s was cast in the series Chopper One (on ABC), about helicopter flying police officers. The series was short lived, and thereafter Hartley moved to Aspen, Colorado, where he volunteered as the managing artistic director at a local theater, and then turned to commodity trading full-time.

In 1987, Hartley became involved with Pavilion Communications Inc., a company designed to acquire smaller entertainment companies. Through this, Hartley learned of an opportunity to take over RKO Pictures. His wife Dina Merrill and he purchased 51% of the company and merged Pavilion Communications with RKO Pictures Corporation in 1991, forming RKO Pictures, LLC. Their first major project was the 1998 remake of Mighty Joe Young. Concord Originals reacquired RKO Pictures from Ted Hartley in 2025. As lead producer and chief storyteller of RKO Pictures, Hartley had led RKO's worldwide development and production activities in movies and television, as well as the expansion of the RKO brand to stage and other entertainment and distribution venues. He produced a remake of Mighty Joe Young (1998) with Disney, Ritual (2002) with Miramax, a remake of The Magnificent Ambersons (2002), and Shade (2003). For RKO Stage, he produced the musicals Never Gonna Dance (2003), Curtains (2007), Gypsy (2008), and 13 (2008), all on Broadway, and Top Hat (2012) in the West End, winner of the 2013 Laurence Olivier Award for Best New Musical.

== Personal life and death ==
In 2013, Hartley was elected chairman of the board of Orbis International, a nonprofit eye-healthcare organization dedicated to saving sight worldwide with which he had been involved since 2010.

Hartley was married to heiress, actress, and philanthropist Dina Merrill from 1989 until her death in 2017.

Hartley belonged to a number of motion picture and television guilds and associations, was a board member of the Steadman Philippon Research Institute (formerly, Steadman-Hawkins Sports Medicine Foundation), and served as director of the Harvard Business School Association of Southern California. He was also a painter.

Hartley turned 100 in 2024, and died in New York City on October 10, 2025.

== Producer credits ==
=== Film ===
- Barely Lethal (producer)
- A Late Quartet (producer)
- Beyond a Reasonable Doubt (producer)
- Are We Done Yet? (producer)
- Laura Smiles (producer)
- Shade (producer)
- The Gin Game (executive producer)
- The Magnificent Ambersons (executive producer)
- Ritual (producer)
- Mighty Joe Young (producer)
- Milk & Money (producer)
- False Identity (executive producer)
- Women And Men: Stories Of Seduction (executive producer)

=== Stage productions ===
- Never Gonna Dance - 2003 Broadway musical
- Curtains - 2007 Broadway musical
- Gypsy - 2008 Broadway musical (revival starring Patti Lupone)
- 13 - 2008 Broadway musical
- Top Hat - 2012 West End Musical

=== Actor credits ===
==== Film ====
- Walk, Don't Run (1966) - Yuri Andreyovitch
- Murderers' Row (1966) - Guard
- Barefoot in the Park (1967) - Frank
- Ice Station Zebra (1968) - Lieutenant Jonathan Hansen
- The Man (1972) - Press Secretary
- High Plains Drifter (1973) - Lewis Belding
- Aloha, Bobby and Rose (1975) - Cop
- Moving Violation (1976) - Prosecutor
- Matilda (1978) - Payne Smith
- Caddyshack II (1988) - Club Member
- False Identity (1990) - Inn Keeper
- The Player (1992) - Party Guest (uncredited)
- Milk & Money (1996) - Lingerie Salesman
- Shade (2003) - 'Teddy' The Surgeon
- Laura Smiles (2005) - Therapist
- Race to Witch Mountain (2009) - Four-Star General V. Lewton
- A Late Quartet (2012) - Winning Bidder
