= Deborah Mollison =

British composer and songwriter (born 1958)

Deborah Mollison (born 29 May 1958) is a British composer and songwriter, Her work includes the score for the 1999 film East is East.

== Life and Education ==
Mollison began composing at the age of seven, having received free music lessons at school. From the age of thirteen, she studied composition, piano and flute at the Royal Academy of Music where she won the Else Cross Prize for pianoforte. Whilst undertaking a Master’s degree at Lancaster University, she was inspired and mentored by the composer Elisabeth Lutyens.

She then went to UCLA to study with Don Ray, Gerry Immel, Jerry Goldsmith after which she returned to UK to Middlesex University where she received her PhD in music. Mollison subsequently taught composition at Middlesex University for eight years.

=== Music ===
Mollison's compositions include film and television scores, songs, and orchestral works. She has composed for commissions from the London Philharmonic Orchestra and the Britten Sinfonia. Mollison regularly conducts her own work and has conducted the London Philharmonic Orchestra, the BBC Concert Orchestra and the Irish Film Orchestra. Deborah's compositions have addressed environmental and social themes. Her 1996 French horn concerto, Global Nation, presents a theme of global unity.

Several of her compositions address environmental and social themes. These include the French horn concerto Global Nation (1996) and the violin concerto Ocean Witness, which focuses on marine life. Her 2020 orchestral work Secret Garden was inspired by the encyclical Laudate Si'. The project received funding from the Jesuit Fund for Social Justice, had the support of the Dicastery for Culture and Education, and later received formal recognition from the Vatican.

== Works ==
Her works include:

- Earth Story (1998) TV documentary mini-series
- Simon Magus (1999)
- Secrets of the Ancients (1999) TV documentary mini-series
- East Is East (1999)
- The Thing About Vince (2000) TV mini-series
- What the Romans Did for Us (2000) TV documentary series
- The Boys of Sunset Ridge (2001)
- Landscape Mysteries (2003)
- Souli (2004)
- Too Much Too Young (2005)
- Violin concerto: Ocean Witness
- Horn concerto: Global Nation
- Maya's Words (tone poem inspired by Maya Angelou)
- For Real (2009)
- Uncle Max (2011)
- Tied to a Chair (2011)
- Horace K48 0.5 (2013)
- Echo Road (2014)
- Luna Park (2015)
- Sipped (2016)
- Heather's Painting (2017)
- The Secret Garden (2020)

== Awards ==
She has won the following awards:

- UK Song '92,
- Gold Medal – Best Short Film at the New York Film Festival "Stand Up the Real Glynn Vernon"
