= AmericanEast =

- Film Poster
- Directed by: Hesham Issawi
- Written by: Sayed Badreya; Hesham Issawi
- Produced by: Anant Singh; Brian Cox; Ahmad Zahra; assistant producer: Pamela Easley; Al Giddings; Grant Hill
- Starring: Sayed Badreya; Tony Shalhoub; Sammy Sheik; Sarah Shahi; Kais Nashif; Al Faris; Richard Chagoury; Tay Blessey; Michael Shalhoub
- Edited by: Chris Wright
- Music by: Tony Humecke
- Release date: November 14, 2008 (Thessaloniki International Film Festival)
- Country: United States
- Languages: English; Arabic

AmericanEast is a 2008 American drama film about Arab-Americans living in Los Angeles after the September 11 attacks. The story examines long-held misunderstandings about Arabic and Islamic culture by focusing on the points-of-view of three main characters.

== Plot ==
Mustafa is a widowed Egyptian immigrant and the owner of Habibe's Café, a popular hangout in Los Angeles for those with Middle Eastern backgrounds. He is devoted to providing his son, Mohammed, with a moral upbringing despite the pressures of contemporary American urban life. He also finds himself cast in the role of protector to his unwed sister Salwah, for whom, by family and custom, he is responsible for finding a traditional suitor. But his respect for tradition comes up against his own aspirations to adapt to the American Dream when he decides to open a new restaurant with a Jewish partner – his friend Sam. This alliance is unpopular amongst the habitués of his café and the insular Arab community in which Mustafa resides. It is one of several personal points of tension that gradually build against the backdrop of larger, national events affecting the Arab-American community and lead to an explosive denouement.

Salwah, Mustafa's sister, must also reconcile her traditional values and familial obligations with new American realities. Although she is grateful to her brother for bringing her to America when she was young, and allowing her to pursue an education, conflict arises between them when he insists upon fulfilling his duty of finding her a traditional, arranged-marriage partner from Egypt. The arrival of this arranged suitor, her older cousin Saber, throws her life into turmoil and makes her question her own beliefs and faith. Secretly, she is attracted to an American, Dr. John Westerman, a young and attractive non-Muslim. Any caution she feels toward him, however, is thrown to the wind by the abrupt arrival of Saber and a possible impending marriage that she does not want. She becomes sorely tempted to experience intimacy with the young doctor outside of marriage, a taboo. While she undergoes this internal conflict, her suitor Saber is staying as a guest at the home she shares with Mustafa and his children, and the incompatibility between this traditional man, her future husband, and Mustafa's Americanized family is another source of irritation adding to the mounting tensions.

Mustafa's friend Omar is a struggling actor and a Habibe's Café regular, a young Egyptian man who supports his dream of becoming a film star by working as a part-time cab driver for Mustafa's ragged, one-car taxi company. Because of his Middle Eastern looks and accent, however, he is constantly cast in the role of a terrorist in American TV shows that portray only a shallow understanding of Arabs and their culture. When an opportunity for a non-racially-designated role arrives, Omar feels his chance for success—to be seen as an actor first, not only a Muslim—has finally arrived. It is the break he has been waiting for on many levels: a chance at the financial freedom necessary to marry and support his pregnant American girlfriend Kate, and a chance for him and his future child to be embraced as American, in the same way that he has embraced America.

But misunderstandings and prejudices related to his Arab background conspire against him once again and his opportunity is lost, pushing Omar to make a drastic, impulsive decision that sets off a chain of events leading to a violent conclusion that affects the lives and conflicts of all the other characters – a dramatic reminder of the simmering pressures under which Muslims live in the United States today.

== Background ==
In March 2003, writer-director Hesham Issawi and actor-writer Sayed Badreya, both Egyptian-born and living in Los Angeles, met with actor Tony Shalhoub, then in his second season of Monk. The two young filmmakers wanted the veteran actor to commit to a short film idea they wished to shoot. A few years previous, Badreya had met Shalhoub in a Cuban restaurant in Los Angeles by walking up to him and introducing himself and managing to leave the chance encounter with Shalhoub's phone number in hand. Shalhoub agreed to consider working with the two young men.

The concept for the short film, written by Issawi and writer Dick Grunert, was very close to Sayed Badreya's real-life conundrum as an Arab-American actor struggling to find roles in the U.S. – he was always cast as a terrorist. Shalhoub responded strongly to the idea, seeing both its poignant and comedic possibilities—and so began the production of the short film T for Terrorist, which the three filmed in March 2003 with Tony Shalhoub performing, Sayed Badreya starring and producing, and Hesham Issawi directing and producing.

When the short did well on the festival circuit, winning Best Short Film awards at the Boston International Film Festival and the San Francisco World Film Festival, the three determined to expand upon the idea of T for Terrorist to develop a bigger project that would represent more characters from the Arab-American community who they felt were constantly being stereotyped by Hollywood. Out of their frustration with that misrepresentation, the idea for AmericanEast began to take shape. Keeping the concept of the frustrated Muslim actor who is always cast as a terrorist, but now giving it a more tragic spin, they began to work on a storyline that touched on their own lives and experiences as Middle Easterners, and the lives and experiences of others, such as Tony Shalhoub's father, himself a Lebanese immigrant. With Shalhoub providing support as an executive producer with development funds, and Issawi and Badreya writing, the project began to take form.

In 2005, once a feature-length script was in hand, Shalhoub began looking for a producer and production company. Through a mutual friend, he approached producer Brian Cox at Distant Horizon, an international film financing company headed by Anant Singh and known for taking a stand on political and social issues in films such as the Oscar-nominated Yesterday. Cox read the script and immediately saw the relevance and timeliness of the project. The company optioned the rights to the project, which they considered the first true Arab-American film, and Cox began to develop the script further with the filmmakers. Eventually, co-production funding was sought through Zahra Pictures, a company run by independent producer Ahmad Zahra, and backed by investor Mohannad Malas, which had made its name specializing in films focusing on Muslim and interfaith issues. Next, line producer Jeff Kirshbaum was brought on to oversee day-to-day production. With the production team, the script, and the full funding in place, the film was slated to begin principal photography in the summer of 2006.

== Cast ==
- Sayed Badreya as Mustafa Marzouke
- Tony Shalhoub as Sam
- Michael Shalhoub as Sam's Brother
- Sarah Shahi as Salwah Marzoke
- Christine Kuludjian as Sam's Wife
- Tim Guinee as Dr. Westerman
- Richard Chagoury as Mohammed Marzoke
- Al Faris as Sabir
- Diane Kim as The Woman In Airport
- Mark Daniel Cade as The Federal Agent
- Ray Wise as Agent Stevens
- Haaz Sleiman as The Angry Customer
- Tay Blessey as Leila Marzoke
- Sammy Sheik as Abdulla
- Erick Avari as Fikry
- John Bryant Davila as Mohammed
- Kimi Reichenberg as Leila's Friend
- Anthony Azizi as Murad
- Narmar Hanna as The Arabic Channel Reporter
- Kais Nashef as Omar
- Amanda Detmer as Kate
- Constance Zimmer as The Director of American Safety
- Paul Clausen as The Assistant Director
- Tony Plana as Dez
- Sam Golzari as David
- Alfre Woodard as Angela Jensen
- Mike Batayeh as YaYa
- Manny Kleinmuntz as Ben

== See also ==
- List of cultural references to the September 11 attacks
- Crash
- Monsieur Ibrahim
- Without a Trace
