= Shade (film) =

- Theatrical release poster
- Directed by: Damian Nieman
- Written by: Damian Nieman
- Produced by: Chris Hammond; Ted Hartley; David Schnepp; Merv Griffin
- Starring: Stuart Townsend; Gabriel Byrne; Thandiwe Newton; Jamie Foxx; Melanie Griffith; Sylvester Stallone; Dina Merrill; Hal Holbrook
- Cinematography: Anthony B. Richmond
- Music by: James Johnzen
- Production companies: DEJ Productions; RKO Pictures
- Distributed by: DEJ Productions
- Release dates: April 25, 2003 (United States Film Festival); April 9, 2004 (United States)
- Running time: 101 minutes
- Country: United States
- Language: English
- Budget: $10 million
- Box office: $458,144

Shade is a 2003 American neo-noir crime thriller film directed and written by Damian Nieman and starring Stuart Townsend, Gabriel Byrne, Thandiwe Newton, Jamie Foxx, Melanie Griffith and Sylvester Stallone. The film follows a trio of grifters who attempt to set up a legendary card shark nicknamed "the Dean". The film had a limited release in the United States on May 7, 2004.

== Plot ==
In an underground mob poker game, a man is revealed to be cheating with a hole card when the game gets robbed. He manages to defend himself as a huge gunfight breaks out, leaving all dead but him and one gangster. They get into a Mexican standoff.

Hustlers Tiffany and Charlie Miller meet up with poker player Larry Jennings as he's winning a game. They agree to a partnership to work a game with a potential profit of $20,000. Larry meets the third member of the team, Vernon, a card mechanic who is working as a blackjack dealer. In a flashback, Vernon switches out the contents of a six deck shoe as his accomplices take the casino for $40,000. That night, as Vernon and Charlie wait for Larry, corrupt cop Scarne shakes them down. Larry arrives and agrees to team with them after seeing Vernon's skills - in the game, he will bet high on Vernon's crooked deals.

At the game, Larry gets impatient with the slow action and, on his own deal, gets over $100,000 in the pot. He loses; the money he bet belongs to a mobster named Malini, who sends his enforcers Marlo and Nate to retrieve him. They take him to the house, revealing it had been stripped bare - everyone at the game was in on the con. They then take Larry to an airport and kill him.

The man and the gangster (from the first scene) agree to cut cards for the money. The gangster cuts a King and the man cuts the Ace of spades. They reach for their guns; the man gets his first and kills the gangster, whose blood splatters on the ace. It is revealed that the story is an urban legend about Dean "the Dean" Stevens, a legendary card shark and player. The crew talk about taking the Dean down at a game with a $250,000 buy-in and total stakes of at least $2,000,000. It is also revealed that Vernon and Tiffany had been lovers until Vernon's sudden departure as a result of a botched job. Tiffany became involved romantically with Charlie afterwards.

The next day, Marlo and Nate track down Charlie to a restaurant and demand the return of Malini's money. Charlie agrees to pay back $100,000 later on, but Nate pulls a gun just in time as Vernon's return, leading to a gunfight. Tiffany arrives in time to kill Nate, but Marlo escapes. Charlie, Vernon and Tiffany escape and hide out at the famed Magic Castle, where Vernon had his start as a card mechanic. They meet The Professor, Vernon's former mentor, who is suspicious of Charlie and insists Vernon is better off without him. Scarne arrives at the murder scene and realizes that the three are involved from a description by the witnesses. Meanwhile, The Dean arrives and meets up with an old flame, Eve, expressing his desire to retire from playing.

The three arrive at the Hollywood Roosevelt Hotel for the game, where they discover that the host is Malini. Vernon and the Dean bust the other players and agree to play five card stud. Eve arrives, and they take a break. The three talk about the trouble Vernon is having and Tiffany speculates the cards are marked. Vernon discovers the Dean is using a "juice deck," a deck marked to be readable when one's eyes are unfocused.

In the final hand, Vernon mucks a card and deals the hand. He deals the Dean two pair, Kings and Queens, and himself a pair of Jacks with a 7 in the hole for the Dean to see. The Dean goes all in, and when Vernon is $50,000 short, Charlie and Tiffany make up the shortfall so he can call the bet. Before the cards are turned up, Marlo enters the room. Identifying the three as the team who conned Larry, Malini's muscle pull their guns and Tiffany pulls hers, in which Scarne enters with his gun drawn. The Dean diffuses the tense situation by insisting that the hand be completed. Vernon swaps out his hole 7 for a third Jack, which would beat the two pair he'd dealt the Dean. The room is stunned when the Dean turns up a third Queen to take the hand and win the game. Malini tells the three they can leave but gently threatens them to stay clear of the Los Angeles rackets.

Charlie splits up the partnership with Vernon and, after Marlo's revelation that he was tipped off by Tiffany about shaking down Larry, with her as well. The next morning, as Vernon sits alone in a diner, The Dean, Eve and Scarne enter, revealing the game was all an elaborate setup by the four of them to con Charlie and Tiffany. They split the take. As the Dean leaves, he pauses to flip the blood-stained Ace of spades to Vernon, confirming the urban legend to be fact. Vernon leaves a $100 tip for the waitress, and heads out, his destination being the Magic Castle.

== Cast ==
- Stuart Townsend as Vernon
- Gabriel Byrne as Charlie Miller
- Thandiwe Newton as Tiffany (credited as Thandie Newton)
- Jamie Foxx as Larry Jennings
- Melanie Griffith as Eve
- Sylvester Stallone as Dean "The Dean" Stevens
  - Jason Cerbone as young Dean Stevens
- Bo Hopkins as Lieutenant John Scarne
- Patrick Bauchau as Max Malini
- Roger Guenveur Smith as Marlo
- B-Real as Nate
- Glenn Plummer as Gas Station Attendant
- Dina Merrill as Dina
- Hal Holbrook as Professor
- Michael Dorn as Jack Thornhill

== Music ==
The Shade soundtrack features three original works, "Penumbra," "Moon Rocks" and "Red Reflections", composed and recorded by jazz composer and flugelhornist Dmitri Matheny. The band The Golden Ratio, together with composer Ken Rangkuty, wrote two original works, "Licentious" and "Never", for the soundtrack.

== Release ==
=== Theatrical ===
The film was produced by RKO Pictures in 2003 and released in the USA on 21 June 2003 at the CineVegas International Film Festival. It began its limited theatrical run on 9 April 2004.

=== Home media ===
The film was initially released on DVD and VHS by distributor DEJ Productions. It later received a widescreen release courtesy of Warner Home Video.

In December 2019, the film was released on Blu-ray for the first time by MVD Entertainment Group, as a part of their Marquee Collection.

== Reception ==
=== Box office ===
Shade was open for only five weeks in six theaters, and it grossed $458,144 in worldwide ticket sales.

=== Critical response ===
The film holds a 67% rating at Rotten Tomatoes based on reviews from 15 critics. Metacritic, which uses a weighted average, assigned the film a score of 40 out of 100, based on 5 critics, indicating "mixed or average" reviews.
