= Ritual (2002 film) =

2002 film by Avi Nesher

- Poster art
- Directed by: Avi Nesher
- Screenplay by: Rob Cohen; Avi Nasher
- Story by: Inez Wallace
- Produced by: Richard Donner; David Giler; Walter Hill; Ted Hartley
- Starring: Jennifer Grey; Craig Sheffer; Daniel Lapaine; Kristen Wilson; Gabriel Casseus; Tim Curry
- Cinematography: David A. Armstrong; Douglas Milsome
- Edited by: Robert A. Ferretti; Michael Schweitzer
- Music by: Shirley Walker
- Production companies: Dimension Films; Silver Pictures
- Distributed by: RKO Pictures
- Release dates: September 18, 2002 (Philippines); May 2, 2006 (United States)
- Running time: 99 minutes 106 minutes (DVD/Blu-ray)
- Country: United States
- Language: English

Ritual is a 2002 American horror film directed by Avi Nesher. A remake of the 1943 film I Walked With a Zombie, it stars Tim Curry, Jennifer Grey, and Craig Sheffer. It was released in select countries in 2002, the Philippines in 2003, and released direct-to-DVD in the United States in 2006. Subsequent home video releases added a newly filmed intro featuring the Crypt Keeper from Tales from the Crypt, though it was not produced as a Tales from the Crypt film. The film is set in Jamaica, and follows an American doctor who takes a job at the estate of a pair of local brothers, where a mysterious illness appears to consume the residents.

== Plot ==
=== Crypt Keeper intro ===
The Crypt Keeper is in Jamaica wearing his hair in "deadlocks". He states that one of his favorite things about Jamaica are the "eye-popping honeys", as it shows different bikini-clad women that are nearby. He then talks about how he just finished wrapping up his new movie in Jamaica. He introduces the movie and tells them "Don't worry, the beast is yet to come".

=== Story ===
Dr. Alice Dodgson is fired from a hospital due to her involvement in the death of a patient. With few options, she decides to take a job as a doctor in Jamaica caring for Wesley Claybourne, a young man apparently suffering from encephalitis. Alice falls in love with Wesley, but she fears that she and Wesley are the targets of a voodoo cult.

She befriends Caro, a local girl. Caro advises Alice that any recrimination from the Voodoo community will only come as a result of her interference with their practices. Tension mounts as Alice suffers additional unexplained phenomena.

Caro is revealed as the cause of the strange goings-on; she is seeking revenge against Wesley because their father Paul killed Caro's mother and rejected Caro as his daughter, denying her an inheritance. Caro attempts to paralyze Alice and turn her into a zombie, but Alice is only partially paralyzed. Alice causes Caro's plan to backfire, and Caro is turned into a zombie instead.

Alice and Wesley abandon Jamaica and move back to the United States. The local Police Chief takes Caro into his home and puts her in his bed.

In a post-credit scene, bloopers from the Crypt Keeper's intro are shown.

== Cast ==
- Jennifer Grey as Dr. Alice Dodgson
- Craig Sheffer as Paul Claybourne
- Daniel Lapaine as Wesley Claybourne
- Kristen Wilson as Caro Lamb
- Gabriel Casseus as J.B.
- Tim Curry as Matthew Hope
- Ron Taylor as Superintendent Archibald
- Erick Avari as Dr. Peter Winsford
- Dorothy Cunningham as Violette
- Kathy Owen as Dr. Shaba
- Natasha Budhi as Dori
- Jessica Collins as Jackie
- Stephen Tobolowsky as Dr. Javitz
- John Kassir as The Voice of The Crypt Keeper

== Production ==
In January 1998, it was reported that RKO Pictures and Miramax had entered into a co-financing and distribution deal to remake 12 films from RKO's library with one of the titles identified being 1943's I Walked with a Zombie. According to then RKO CEO Ted Hartley, there was a limited amount of time left on the copyright of several of these films which spurred the rush to remake them. In April of that year, Miramax's genre label Dimension Films had struck a deal with Richard Donner, David Giler, Walter Hill, Joel Silver, and Robert Zemeckis to become the theatrical distributor for a new iteration of Tales from the Crypt films. An early draft of I Walked with a Zombie was written by Howard McCain. In October of that year, Rob Cohen was hired as writer and director and described his take on the film as "Fatal Attraction with black magic". Dimension eventually re-titled the film Ritual and opted to release it with the Tales from the Crypt branding with Cohen having since departed the film and now directed and re-written by Avi Nesher.

== Release ==
Ritual was originally released for foreign countries in 2002. The film saw release in the Philippines on September 18, 2002, and was also released in Japan on January 25, 2006. It was not released in the United States until May 2, 2006, on DVD. It was later released on Blu-ray in the United States on December 4, 2012.
