= Pavel Bergmann =

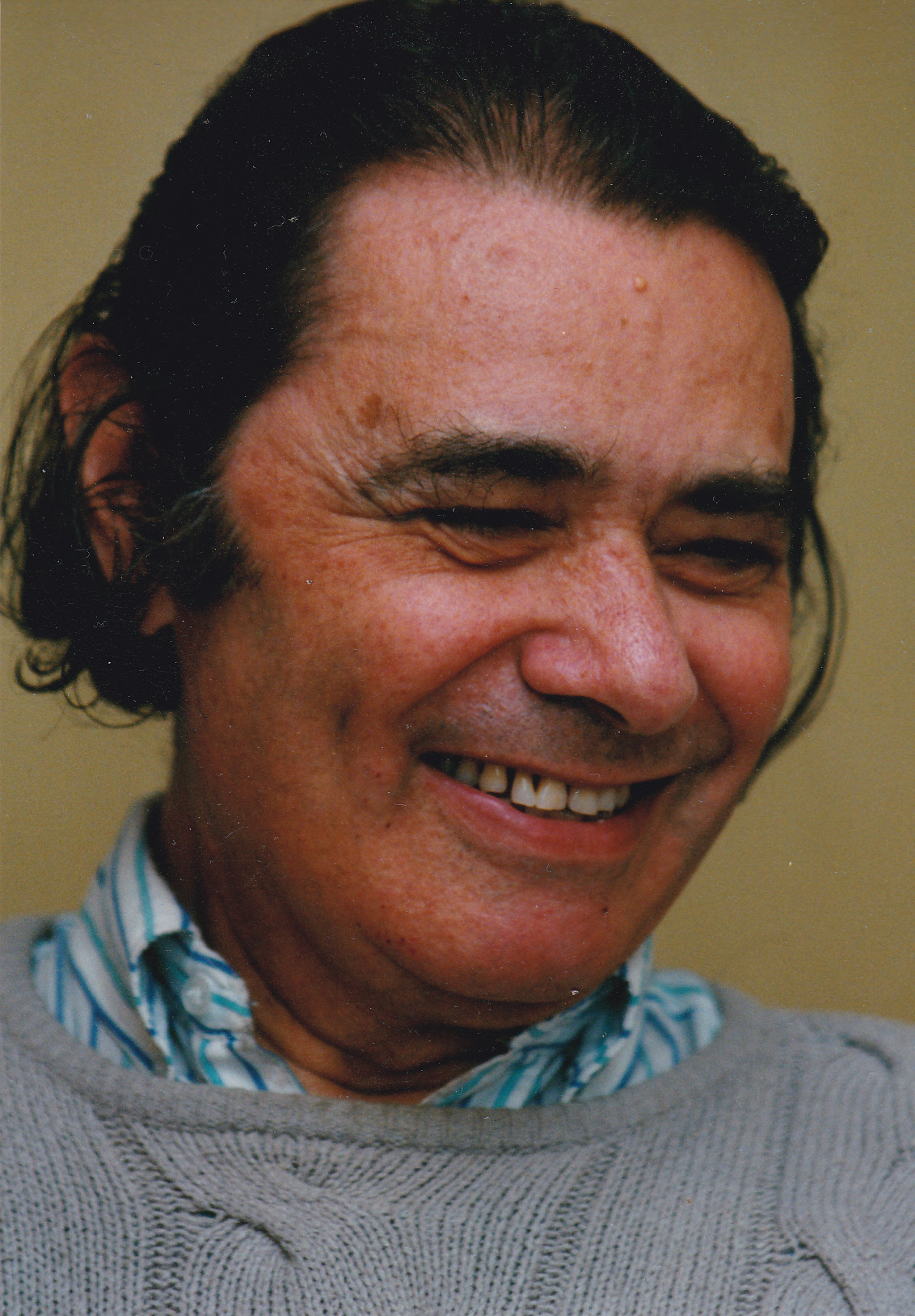
- Pavel Bergmann
- Born: 14 February 1930; Prague, Czechoslovakia
- Died: 17 April 2005 (aged 75); Prague, Czech Republic
- Education: Charles University in Prague
- Occupations: Historian, Philosopher
- Spouse: Eva Bergmannová
- Children: 5
- Relatives: Pavel Opočenský (son-in-law)

Pavel Bergmann (14 February 1930, in Prague – 17 April 2005, in Prague) was a Czech historian, philosopher, a signatory of the Charter 77 manifesto, and a founding member of the Civic Forum.

== Early life ==
Pavel Bergmann was born in Prague, Czech Republic on 14 February 1930 to Jindřich Bergmann and Karolina Steinova. His father's family belonged to the Jewish-German cultural circle. His mother belonged to the Czech cultural circle. After his father died when he was two years old, his grandfather brought him up.

== World War II ==
After the Munich crisis in 1938, the prevailing circumstances prevented his mother from emigrating. She was on a special Gestapo list because she had supported German and Austrian refugees in Czechoslovakia who were fleeing the Nazis. She was deported to Terezín Ghetto and died there in the spring of 1943. Later he was deported to the ghetto in October 1942 and was there until the spring of 1944. In May 1944 Bergmann was deported to Auschwitz-Birkenau, where he was until the start of the evacuation of this concentration camp in January 1945. Subsequently, he was transported to the Mauthausen concentration camp in Austria. The American army freed the camp in May 1945.

== Education ==
Bergmann returned to Prague in the spring of 1945. Most of the members of his family had been murdered by the Nazis, so he lived with his grandmother in Northwestern Bohemia. He finished high school in Teplice. Bergmann was interested in history and philosophy and was fortunate to start his studies while some of the leading scholars still worked at Charles University in Prague. He has been a member of the Czech Historical Club since 1947 and was able to attend lectures by Professors Jindřich Chalupecký, František Roubík, František Kutnar, and Jan Patočka.

In the fall of 1947 he entered the Czechoslovak Social Democratic Party and did not side with those members of the party who joined the Communists in June 1948. In 1950, when another wave of persecutions was coming, he was told by some Communist friends that further purges were imminent. He decided to leave Prague. He had reasons to be wary because he had known a number of prominent people who were persecuted by the Communist regime, for instance Arthur London who was sentenced to life imprisonment in the well-known trial of Rudolf Slánský. He did not interrupt his studies, but at the same time, he taught small children to read, write, and do arithmetic at the elementary level in a small village.

At university he was interested mainly in history, but he also studied philosophy, sociology and psychology. Since the beginning of liberalization in the Eastern Bloc in 1956, he had tried to enter public life as a member of the organization that united victims and veterans of World War II. At the time, Antonín Novotný, a former Mauthausen prisoner, whom he knew from the concentration camp, was the president of Czechoslovakia. That helped Bergmann convince him to demand a plaque in memory of the German Social Democrats and Communists who were executed because of their activities as resistance fighters.

== Career ==
Pavel Bergmann worked as a scholar at the Philosophical Faculty of Charles University in Prague. In 1964 he was a witness at the Frankfurt Auschwitz trials of the leading SS men from the Auschwitz concentration camp. The protocol of this trial was published in English, and the introduction was written by Hannah Arendt. German playwright Peter Weiss used this trial as the basis for his 1965 play The Investigation, about the essence of totalitarian crimes against humanity and the role of human beings in such conditions.

In the second half of the 1960s, he was able to pursue the studies that were in his interest, that is, the study of totalitarian regimes, especially Nazism. He was also interested in the problems of the Communist totalitarian system. Since then, he had been helping in the reconciliation of the Czech and German nations. He continued his endeavors in this direction even after the restoration of Stalinism in Czechoslovakia after 1968, the year of the Prague Spring and its suppression.

In 1968 he took part in the attempt to reform the Czechoslovak political system and was among those who tried to renew the Czechoslovak Social Democratic Party. He worked as an advisor on Germany for Josef Smrkovský, the chairman of the National Assembly. In autumn of 1969, the Czechoslovak borders were again closed, and thereafter, he returned to Prague from Berlin where he lectured.

In 1970 he was forced to leave the university. As a Jew, he could leave the country whenever he wanted. However, he considered it his duty to stay in Czechoslovakia and to resist the repression of the Czech nation by neo-Stalinists. He tried to keep his contacts abroad, and worked mainly for Amnesty International. In the summer of 1976 Professor Jan Patočka asked him to become his political advisor. In December 1976 Bergmann took part in the founding of the Charter 77 movement. Together with Rudolf Battěk he founded the Independent Socialistic Movement in Czechoslovakia. The main reason for the establishment of this movement was to link the movement for human rights in Czechoslovakia with political structures of the democratic West.

In the period 1979 to 1980, he was a co-editor of Dialogue: a Cultural and Political Review, published in a samizdat. In winter 1980, Bergmann and his co-workes formed the Committee of Charter 77. His very intensive period of political activity culminated in the fall of 1988 with the establishment of the so-called Movement for Civil Liberty, which was the direct predecessor of the Civic Forum. One of the co-founders of it was future president of the Czech Republic, Václav Havel.

The intensive political opposition actively against the Communist regime was crowned in the autumn of 1989 by the establishment of the Civic Forum which initiated and led the anti-Communist Velvet revolution. Bergmann worked in a leading position for Civic Forum. During the revolution, Bergmann was one of the renewers of the Czechoslovak Social Democratic Party.

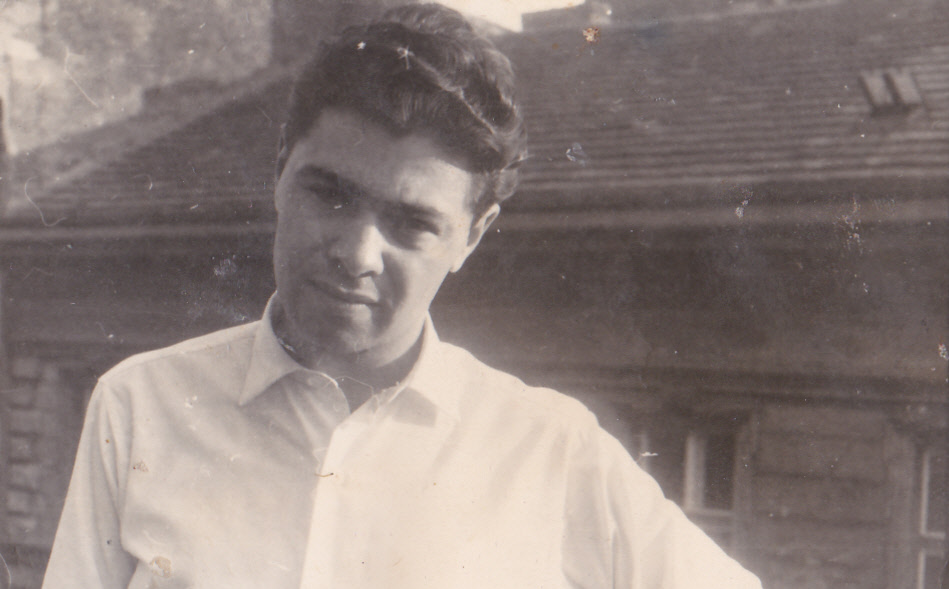
Pavel Bergmann

== Political career ==
During his life, Bergmann was heavily involved in the politics of Czechoslovakia and later Czech Republic. He was an important member of the Dissident Movement which was fighting for the independence of Czechoslovakia from the Communist Regime. Bergmann held a number of political positions including:

- 1968, Member of the new Czechoslovak Social Democratic Party.
- 1968, Advisor to Josef Smrkovský, the chairman of the National Assembly.
- 1976, Political Advisor to Jan Patočka.
- 1976, Founding Member of Charter 77 movement.
- 1976, Founder of the Independent Socialistic Movement in Czechoslovakia, along with Rudolf Battěk
- 1980, Founder of the Committee of Charter 77
- 1988, Part of Movement for Civil Liberty, the direct predecessor to the Civic Forum, alongside future President Václav Havel.
- 1989, Leading Advisor for the Civic Forum.
- 1990s, One of several renewers behind the newly reformed Czechoslovak Social Democratic Party.

== Personal life ==
Bergmann was married once, to Eva Bergmannová and the couple had two sons, scientist Pavel Bergmann Jr. and film producer Daniel Bergmann. The marriage ended in divorce and he had three children with his domestic partner, also named Eva, however they never married. Bergmann died on 17 April 2005 in Prague aged 74. He was survived by his wife, 5 children, and three grandchildren. Bergmann's daughter Julie married sculptor Pavel Opočenský.

== See also ==
- List of Czech and Slovak Jews
- Charter 77
- Civil resistance
- Velvet Revolution
- Holocaust
- List of Holocaust survivors
