= Berta Fanta =

Czech literary and intellectual figure

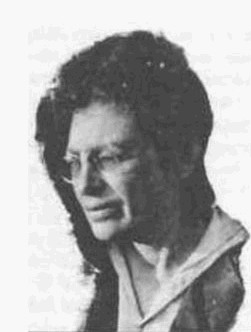
Berta Fanta

Berta Fanta (née Sohr; May 19, 1865 – December 18, 1918), was a literary and intellectual figure from Prague. She was at the centre of the Prague intelligentsia with a "salon" meeting at her house.

== Life ==
Berta was born in 1865 to a well-off Jewish family in the small town of Libochovice (Libochowitz). Her birthplace is located near Prague, and while it was located in the Austrian Empire at the time of her birth, it is currently located in the Czech Republic. While of Jewish descent, in her adult life, she was uninterested in Judaism and lacked knowledge of traditional Jewish customs. However, she spent most of her life in Prague, where her husband was a prominent pharmacist.

== The salon ==
In Prague, Berta Fanta was the hostess of a prominent and famous literary and philosophic salon. The salon was called Cafe Louvre, the name of its first venue. Later, the salon was hosted at the Fanta's house. In the two decades before World War I, many prominent individuals attended Fanta's salon, including theoretical physicist Albert Einstein, philosopher Christian von Ehrenfels, writers Franz Kafka and Max Brod, anthroposophist Rudolf Steiner, and philosopher Hugo Bergmann (who became Berta's son-in-law; he was the husband of Berta's daughter Else). The various topics discussed at her salon included philosophy, science, literature, and Islam. But the meetings weren't limited only to intellectual or spiritual pursuits. Some social evenings were based around art and music. There were themed masquerades and parodies of literary works were also performed. Albert Einstein would play his violin in duets with the pianist Ottilie Nagel.

The gatherings ceased around the beginning of World War I, when Fanta's son-in-law Hugo Bergmann was conscripted into the army. In 1920 Bergman, and presumably his wife, moved to Palestine, where he was the first director of the national library.

Berta herself lectured on literary topics such as Johann Wolfgang von Goethe, and she also went to university lectures and concerts on a regular basis along with her sister, Ida Freund (with whom Berta also traveled). She was a large fan of German culture, especially the music of Richard Wagner and the writings of the philosopher Friedrich Nietzsche. Fanta was said to have much preferred German culture to Czech culture, however she was a fan of Czech music including Dvořák

== Death and legacy ==
Fanta did not routinely publish her literary works. Although a small number of her poems and her diary were published. Desiring to be with her son-in-law Hugo, Berta decided to emigrate to Palestine. However, she died before she was able to emigrate.
