= Sayed Badreya =

Egyptian-American actor

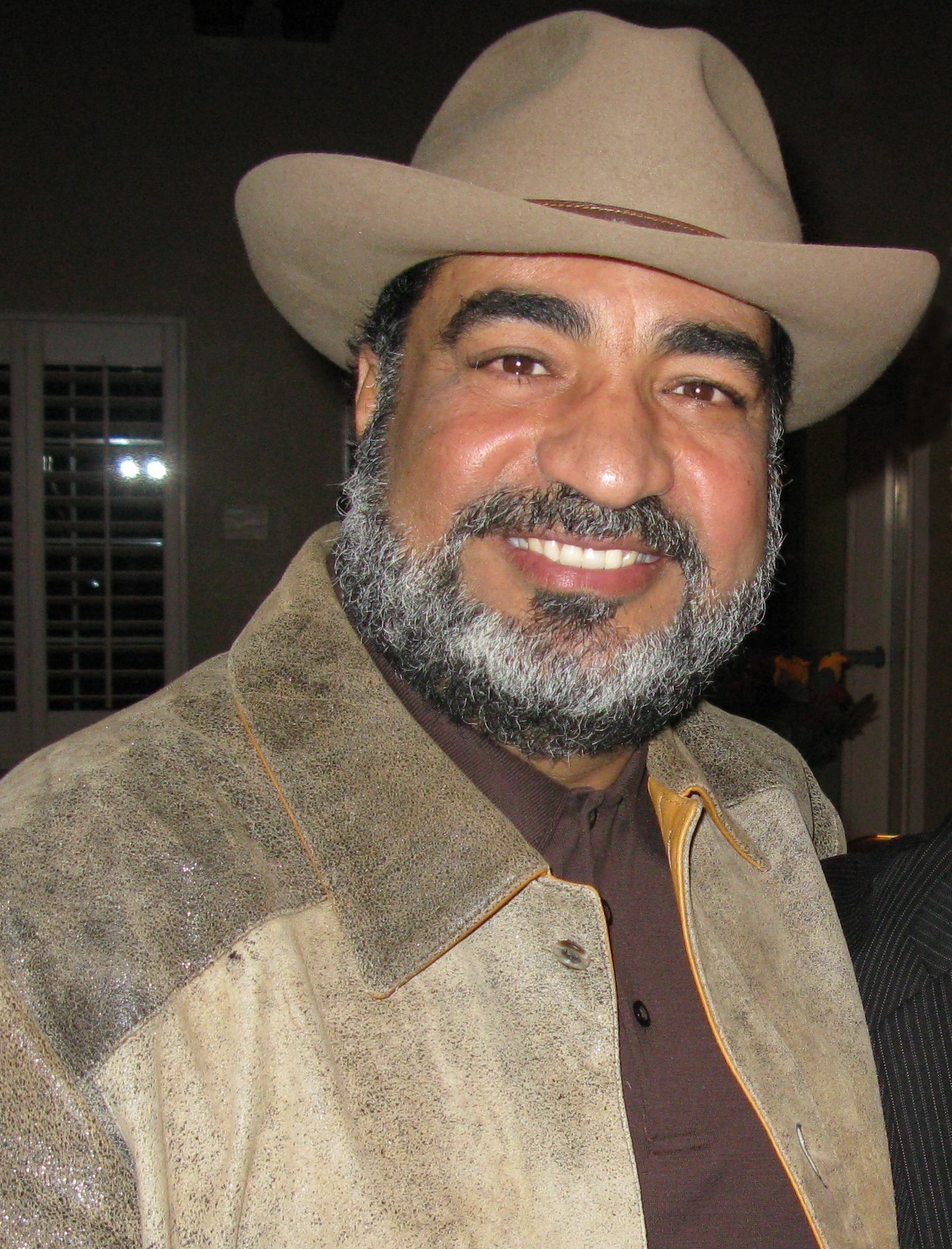
- Badreya in 2009
- Born: El Sayed Badreya; February 4, 1957 (age 69); Port Said, Egypt
- Education: New York University film school
- Occupation: Actor
- Years active: 1987–present

El Sayed Badreya (Arabic: سيد بدرية) is an Egyptian-American actor.

== Career ==
Badreya has had many roles in movies and television. He appeared in AmericanEast, Iron Man, Cargo, and The Dictator. He also provided motion capture and voice work for the pirate Rameses in Uncharted 3: Drake's Deception.

== Filmography ==
Year	Title	Role	Notes
1987	Hotshot		
1988	Lucky Stiff		Craft service
1988	The Taking of Flight 847: The Uli Derickson Story	Skull & Crossbones	TV movie
1991	Intimate Stranger	Clerk	TV movie
1993	The November Men	Lahoud	as Elsayed Badreya
1994	Seinfeld	Foreign Man	TV series 1 episode
1994	Stargate	Arabic Interpreter	
1995	Mirage	Sayed	
1996	Executive Decision		Technical Adviser of Arabia
1996	Independence Day	Arab Pilot	
1996	Kingpin	mechanic	
1998	The Nanny	Guard	TV series 1 episode
1999	Deterrence	Omari	
1999	Three Kings	Iraqi Tank Major	
1999	The Insider	Hezbollah Head Gunman	
2001	The Princess and the Marine	Driver	TV movie
2001	Alias	Vendor	TV series 1 episode
2001	Shallow Hal	Doctor Sayed	
2002	Saving Egyptian Film Classics		Director, writer and producer
2002	The Practice	Adman Fajiz	TV series 1 episode
2003	Casting Calls	Himself	TV documentary
2003	The Interrogation		Short; Co-producer
2003	T for Terrorist	Sayed, Terrorist	Short; Also producer
2003	Stuck on You	Assisting Surgeon	
2004	Homeland Security	Jamaitja	TV movie
2004	The West Wing	Fatah Official #2	TV series 1 episode
2004	Soul Plane	Middle Eastern Passenger	
2005	Mush	Mush's Father	Short; Also producer
2005	SOCOM 3 U.S. Navy SEALs	Additional Morocco AO Voices	Voice, Video game
2005	SOCOM U.S. Navy SEALs: Fireteam Bravo	Additional Morocco AO Voices	Voice, Video game
2006	The Unit	Afghan Commander	TV series 1 episode
2006	NUMB3RS	Sayed Malik	TV series 1 episode
2006	It's Not Just You, Tommy Chu!		Executive producer
2006	The Path to 9/11	Massoud Assassin	TV miniseries Also dialect coach
2008	Iron Man	Abu Bakaar	
2008	You Don't Mess with the Zohan	Hamdi	
2008	AmericanEast	Mustafa Marzoke	Also writer
2008	Prisoners	Kamal	Short
2009	El Traspatio	El Sultán	
2009	Lost	Sayid's Father	TV series 1 episode
2009	Easy Money	Chuck Habib	TV series 1 episode
2010	The Space Between	Imam	
2010	Baram & Hamza	Uncle Anwar	Short
2010	When Life Gives You Lemons	Sayed	Short
2010	Family Prayers (aka Karim & Suha)	Hussein	Short
2011	Chicago Mirage	Moustafa	Short; Also director, writer and producer
2011	Cargo	Sayed	
2011	Uncharted 3: Drake's Deception	Rameses, / Yemeni Citizens, Bedouin Riders	Voice, Video game
2011	Tied to a Chair	Kamal	
2011	This Narrow Place	Aziz	
2012	The Three Stooges	Orderly	
2012	Window Lies		Short; Also writer and executive producer
2012	The Dictator	Omar	Also technical advisor (uncredited)
2012	Just like a Woman	Tarek	
2012	Factory of Lies	Kareem	Short
2013	America in Arabic	Himself	TV series
2013	Movie 43	Large Man	(segment "Truth or Dare")
2013	The C Gate	Iraqi Messenger	Short
2013	The Mercury Dancer		Short; Executive producer
2014	Boiling Pot	Anwar Seif	
2014	Sound of Fear		Short
2014	The End of Egypt or the Brotherhood	Himself	Documentary; Also director, writer and producer
2018	Apple & Onion	Falafel	Voice, TV series
2020	Vanguard	Abati	
2024	Hello Beautiful	Malek	
