= Lads Society =

Far-right extremist group

- Abbreviation: LADSOC
- Predecessor: United Patriots Front; Australian Defence League; Reclaim Australia
- Successor: National Socialist Network; European Australian Movement
- Formation: 2017; 9 years ago
- Founder: Thomas Sewell
- Defunct: 2020; 6 years ago
- Type: White nationalist organisation
- Purpose: Neo-Nazism, White nationalism
- Chairman: Thomas Sewell
- Affiliations: United Patriots Front, Antipodean Resistance, Soldiers of Odin, Fraser Anning's Conservative National Party, True Blue Crew, Reclaim Australia
- Formerly called: United Patriots Front

The Lads Society (LADSOC) is an Australian far-right, white nationalist, Islamophobic extremist group founded by several former members of the United Patriots Front (UPF) in late 2017. It established club houses in Sydney and Melbourne. The Lads Society came to national prominence after it staged a rally in St Kilda, Victoria, targeting the local African Australian community. Attendees were seen making the Nazi salute and one was photographed wearing an SS helmet.

In 2017, the group's leader, New Zealand-born Thomas Sewell asked Brenton Harrison Tarrant (who would later become the perpetrator of the 2019 Christchurch mosque shootings) to join the Lads Society, but Tarrant refused. The group's members and allies attempted to infiltrate the Young Nationals in New South Wales, and engaged in branch stacking at the May 2018 conference. Lads Society members attained leadership positions in the Young Nationals, but were later forced out of the party. The Melbourne Chapter became the National Socialist Network (NSN), which was active until January 2026, when it disbanded along with its affiliated groups European Australian Movement and White Australia in response to incoming Australian legislation that would have allowed such organisations to be banned.

== History ==
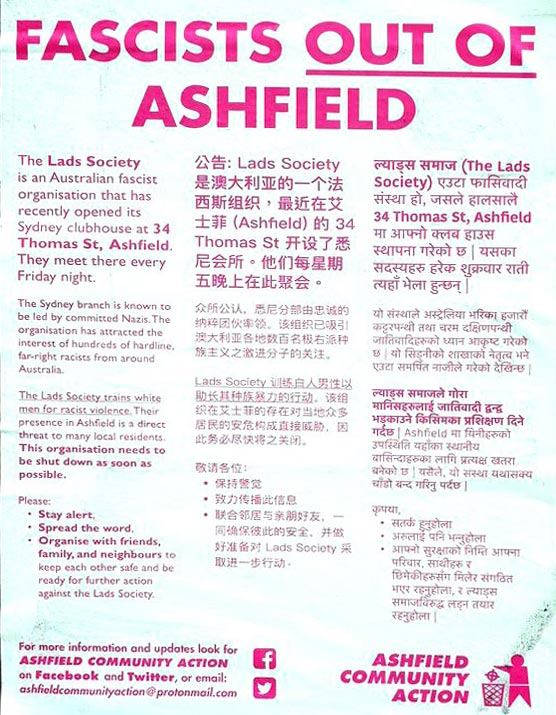
Ashfield Community Action group antifascist poster protesting the presence of the Lads Society in Ashfield

In 2017, members of the United Patriots Front, Blair Cottrell, Neil Erikson, Chris Shortis and former UPF lieutenant Thomas Sewell, along with Nathaniel Anderson and Jacob Hersant, members of the neo-Nazi Antipodean Resistance, were involved in the creation of the Lads Society, a private far-right men-only club, with a base in Melbourne.

A Sydney club followed in April 2018, and there were plans to expand into other states. The clubs include a boxing gym where weekly "fight nights" take place and a library.

In 2018, a local Sydney community group called Ashfield Community Action (ACA) formed in order to oppose the Lads Society. The group distributed posters that aimed to warn the suburb's residents about the group, stating that "The Sydney Branch is known to be led by committed Nazis", and that the organisation "has attracted the interest of hundreds of hard line far-right racists from around Australia". It accused the group of "training white men for racist violence" and called for it to be "shut down as soon as possible".

Lads Society members provided a security detail for far-right white nationalist Lauren Southern during her 2018 Australian tour. Photos from the event show members displaying the white power symbol hand sign gang signal.

In early January 2019, Erikson and Cottrell promised to unleash a Cronulla-style race riot on Melbourne. During the rally a significant number of participants were documented giving Nazi salutes.

Undated videos leaked to the press in November 2019 revealed Sewell's aim to attract and recruit members from mainstream society under the guise of a men's fitness club. His white supremacist agenda was clearly shown as he outlined plans which included the creation of "Anglo-European" enclaves in Australian cities, encouraging the "speed and ferocity of the decay" of society to help foment a "race war" by such tactics as exploiting the "African gangs" trope used by Home Affairs Minister Peter Dutton and other mainstream politicians.

== See also ==
- Australian Defence League
- Antipodean Resistance, Australian neo-Nazi group that emerged around the same time as Reclaim Australia
- Australia First Party, Australian far-right political party associated with Reclaim Australia
- Far-right politics in Australia
- Islamophobia in Australia
- National Action, Australian neo-Nazi group
- National Socialist Network, Australian neo-Nazi group that succeeded the Lads Society
- Q Society
- Reclaim Australia
- Romper Stomper (TV series) – TV series featuring a group similar to Reclaim Australia
- Soldiers of Odin (apparently defunct as of late 2016)
- True Blue Crew – Reclaim Australia splinter group
- Ultranationalism
- United Patriots Front
- White nationalism
- White supremacy
- Yellow Vest Australia (formerly Australian Liberty Alliance)
