= Thomas Sewell (neo-Nazi) =

Australian neo-Nazi and convicted criminal (born 1993)

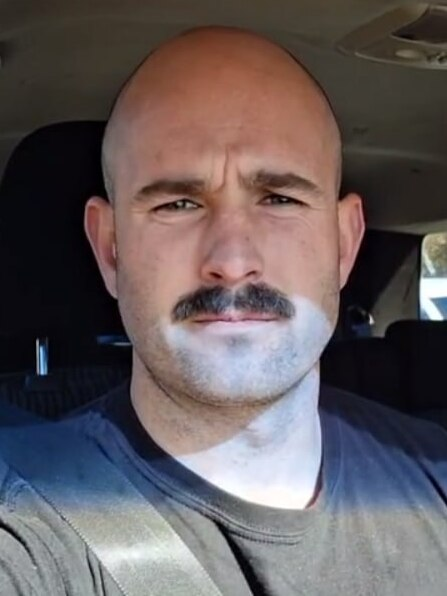
- Sewell in 2025
- Born: 1993 (age 32–33); New Zealand
- Citizenship: Australian
- Known for: Far-right activism and neo-Nazism Founding: Lads Society; National Socialist Network; European Australian Movement
- Other political affiliations: Reclaim Australia; United Patriots Front

Thomas Sewell (born 1993) is an Australian neo-Nazi activist and organiser, known for controversial public activism, violent criminal conduct, and promotion of Nazism. He was the leader of the National Socialist Network until its disbandment in 2026. He was also the leader of the European Australian Movement and the founder of the Lads Society. The groups led by Sewell focus on promoting white supremacy and far-right activism in Australia.

According to Sewell, in 2017 he attempted to recruit Brenton Tarrant, the eventual perpetrator of the 2019 Christchurch mosque shootings, into the Lads Society. Sewell drew public condemnation in 2021 after he attacked a security guard at a television office. In October 2023, he was sentenced to a prison term of one month and seven days after attacking hikers at Victoria's Cathedral Range. He was arrested in Melbourne on 2 September 2025, after having allegedly been part of a group that attacked Indigenous Australians at Camp Sovereignty in Melbourne during the March for Australia rallies two days prior.

== Early life and education ==
Thomas Sewell was born in 1993 in New Zealand. He moved to Australia as a young child with his parents and older brother. Sewell attended Balwyn High School in Melbourne, Australia, graduating in 2010. Between 2012 and 2014, he was an Australian Army infantryman.

After leaving the Army, Sewell studied civil engineering at Swinburne University of Technology, but left without graduating. While attending university, he worked in security and hospitality. After leaving university Sewell worked in residential care for at-risk children and then for a roofing and plumbing business.

== Activities ==
=== 2015–2020 ===
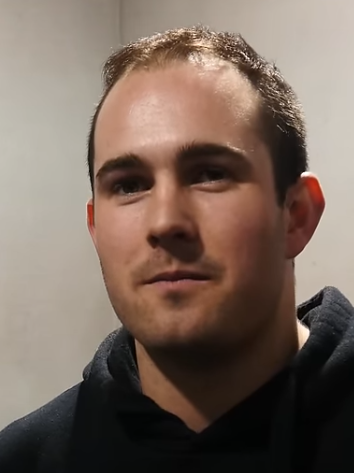
Sewell in 2018

Between 2015 and 2017 Sewell was a member of Reclaim Australia and the United Patriots Front (UPF). The UPF split from Reclaim Australia around May 2015. In the UPF, Sewell was the second in command to Blair Cottrell, the founder of the group. In 2017, conflict emerged between UPF members, with Sewell (supported by Cottrell and Neil Erikson) rejecting democracy and developing an explicitly revolutionary neo-Nazi, antisemitic, conspiratorial ideology, in contrast to the UPF's earlier plans. In late 2017, Sewell and Cottrell founded the Lads Society, a men's only far-right, white nationalist group that branded itself as a fitness group. Videos leaked to the press in November 2019 revealed that Sewell's aim was to attract and recruit members from mainstream society using the pretense of a men's fitness club.

Sewell attempted to recruit for the Lads Society out of members and associates of the UPF. As part of this plan, Sewell invited Brenton Tarrant (later the perpetrator of the 2019 Christchurch mosque shootings) to join the Lads Society. Tarrant, who had been active in United Patriot Front Facebook groups and was Facebook friends with Sewell, refused to join; however, he praised their activism online. Sewell later stated that Tarrant had refused to join as he did not see a peaceful solution to "European people being genocided".

In 2018, Cottrell distanced himself from Sewell and his turn to explicitly neo-Nazi rhetoric and aims. Sewell began to recruit outside of former UPF members, instead focusing on teenage males who were new to the far-right movement; in an interview, he said the young generation of white Australian males were "Generation Zyklon" and said that "There is an intergenerational war in our politics [...] [this] is a circumstance of the whole Globalist system and the failure of democracy". At this time he denounced the UPF's strategy in favor of a revolutionary strategy. The 2019 Christchurch shootings resulted in the Lads Society coming under investigation, which hampered its activity, and Sewell shut down the group, saying it was "not strong or explicit enough". He called the Lads Society a "placeholder" of a group to draw in members before a more explicitly racist group was to take its place.

=== 2021: Founding of the National Socialist Network and attacks ===
Sewell founded the National Socialist Network (NSN) in early 2021, and was the leader until its disbanding. The NSN was established through a merger of the Lads Society and Antipodean Resistance. Unlike the earlier movements Sewell was associated with, the NSN was explicitly neo-Nazi in orientation, and its messaging was more explicitly violent. Sewell is also the leader of the European Australian Movement (EAM), also established in 2021.

In January 2021, over the Australia Day weekend, 38 members of EAM were photographed performing Nazi salutes next to Lake Bellfield at the foot of the Grampians in western Victoria. The group burnt a cross and chanted racist slogans at passers-by, including "White power" and Sieg Heil. The group's actions drew the attention of local police as well as intelligence officers from Victoria Police's Counter-Terrorism Command.

On 1 March 2021, the Australian TV program A Current Affair, a Nine Network program, broadcast a report on the NSN. An hour before it aired, Sewell and Jacob Hersant, a neo-Nazi associate of Sewell, arrived at Nine Network's Melbourne office demanding to speak to staff about the program. When a security guard, a black man, requested that they leave, Hersant said to the guard, "dance monkey, dance". The security guard was then repeatedly punched in the face and fell to the ground. Sewell continued to repeatedly hit the guard after he fell. When additional security came to the aid of the beaten man, Sewell and Hersant fled. The assault drew condemnation from Victorian Premier Daniel Andrews who called it "sickening". Victoria Police's Counter-Terrorism Command charged Sewell with affray, recklessly causing injury and unlawful assault. In December 2022, he contested the charges in the Melbourne Magistrates Court, attending with several supporters, including Blair Cottrell. Other supporters watched the proceedings online. The following week, Sewell was found guilty of affray and recklessly causing injury. On 12 January 2023, he was sentenced to an 18-month community corrections order with 150 hours of community service. After being sentenced, Sewell performed a Nazi salute outside the courtroom.

In May 2021, Sewell and up to 15 other masked men attacked hikers in Victoria's Cathedral Range. Sewell's blood was found inside the car of the attacked hikers. On 14 May 2021, Sewell was charged after a raid by counter-terrorism police at a house in the Melbourne suburb of Rowville. Sewell was charged with armed robbery, robbery, theft, criminal damage, affray with a face covering, affray, assault with a weapon, violent disorder, common law assault and committing an indictable offence while on bail. On 1 August 2023, Sewell and Jacob Hersant pleaded guilty to one charge of violent disorder. On 27 October 2023, Sewell was sentenced to one month and seven days in prison. As he had already served the sentence while on remand, he was spared further jail time.

In August 2021, Nick McKenzie hosted a segment on 60 Minutes showcasing their investigation involving an undercover operative infiltrating the NSN. In footage taken by the operative Sewell is heard stating that they were fighting for a white Australia and a global white revolution. During the segment Sewell is seen leading his members as they shout blood and honour, and perform Nazi salutes. At a later gathering Sewell and his members commemorate Adolf Hitler's birthday. McKenzie during the segment narrates that Sewell had a plan to build a white only base in rural Victoria, which Sewell states is their first goal. During part of the undercover footage, Sewell admits that during a previous police raid of his house that they found on his phone a meme celebrating Brenton Tarrant. Sewell goes on to state that he is opposed to Tarrant's jailing and that the NSN should fight for his release. Mike Burgess, chief of the Australian Security Intelligence Organisation (ASIO), stated that NSN views were of concern, especially when it came to promoting acts of violence, and that they were getting ASIO's as well as other law enforcement agencies' full attention.

=== 2023–2025 ===
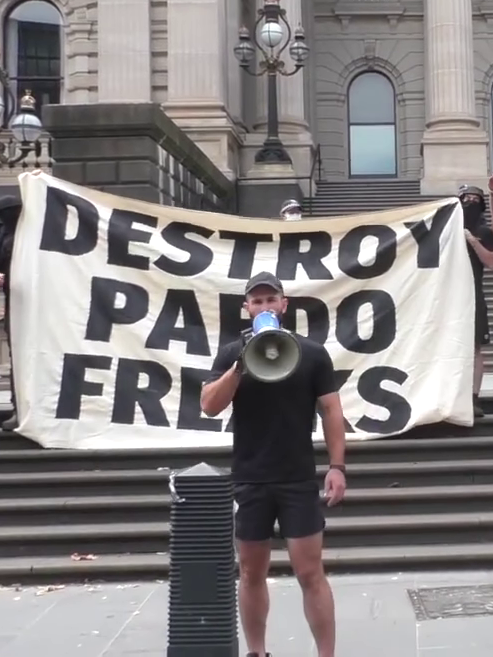
Sewell at an anti-trans protest on 18 March 2023

On 18 March 2023, Sewell attended a rally in Melbourne with 30 other neo-Nazis, including members of the NSN. The rally was organised by British anti-trans activist Kellie-Jay Keen-Minshull and Moira Deeming, while Keen-Minshull was visiting the city on her Australian and New Zealand tour. Sewell and other members of the NSN marched down Spring Street, performed Nazi salutes on the stairs of Parliament House and referred to transgender people as paedophiles. The neo-Nazis clashed with others who were protesting in support of transgender rights. Police, including mounted officers, attempted to separate the groups. NSN's involvement in the rally was condemned by MPs from both the Labor Party and the Liberal Party.

In December 2023, Sewell led a white-supremacist march though Ballarat, a regional Victorian city. The group was carrying a banner which stated "Australia for the White Man, National Socialist Network". The group also chanted "Australia for the white man, [the] rest must go", "heil victory", and "white man, fight back". After the event Sewell was charged with behaving in an offensive manner. During a court hearing on 24 October 2025, Sewell said that his copy of Mein Kampf had been confiscated, due to him at that time being in remand. He said that he needed the book in order to prepare his case. The magistrate directed the Deputy Commission of Corrections to give Sewell access his copy of Mein Kampf for the duration of the hearings. During a multi-day hearing, Sewell argued to the court that his "conduct was political and not offensive". Magistrate Mike Wardell found Sewell not guilty on 28 October 2025, stating that Victoria Police had not proven their case.

On Australia Day (26 January) 2024, Sewell and a group of NSN members were stopped and questioned by police in North Sydney. Sewell was served with a public order banning him from the city of Sydney local government area for the day, and from attending any events relating to Australia Day. Police told Sewell that the reasons for the order were his ideology, his associates, incidents he has been involved in, his criminal history and his goal of intimidating and provoking people.

On 22 October 2024 Sewell and other NSN members attempted to disrupt a refugee rights protest outside of a Department of Home Affairs office. Following the NSN's counterprotest Sewell allegedly made comments online in which he intimidated a police officer. In the comments, Sewell stated that his followers had identified a Victoria police officer who had attempted to remove a mask from one of the neo-Nazis who had attended the counterprotest. Sewell said that the police officer had attempted to dox the member, and that they had downloaded content about the officer and their family from social media and were looking for a legal way to post it to the internet.

In November 2024, Sewell was charged in relation to the online comments after a police 'day of action' against the NSN. He attended court for a three-day contest hearing in September 2025. In court it was alleged that he had intimidated a police officer, contravening personal intervention orders, having others post material about protected persons online and sharing a video on Twitter of the alleged victims. On 12 September 2025, Sewell was found guilty of intimidating the police officer and their partner; and ordered to perform 200 hours of community service.

On 26 January 2025, Australia Day, around 40 members of the NSN, most of whom who had travelled from outside of South Australia, marched through Adelaide city centre, dressed in black and wearing sunglasses and hats. Chanting "Australia for the white man", the NSN group stood in front of the War Memorial on North Terrace. South Australia Police arrested 16 people, including a 16-year-old boy, on charges including loitering and displaying Nazi symbols. Sewell and 13 other men appeared in court on 28 January, charged with a variety of offences. Police alleged that Sewell was wearing an Arrow Cross star which is linked to a Hungarian fascist party with Nazi associations. During the hearing Sewell stated that was not prepared to agree to the bail conditions, which included a ban on associating or communicating with other neo-Nazis in the NSN. He claimed that he was the subject of political persecution and that if his home address was made public that journalists might "firebomb" his house. Sewell was remanded to custody after his refusal to agree to his bail conditions, later agreeing to them on 30 January 2025 and being released. Charges against Sewell were later dropped.

At about 12:40am on 9 August 2025, Sewell and around 100 members of the NSN, mostly with their faces covered, marched through Melbourne's central business district. Concerning the march, Victorian Premier Jacinta Allen stated "Nazis don't belong in this country and they know it. That's why they hide behind masks in the dark." Allen further said that her government would "introduce powers for police to unmask cowards at protests". On 2 September 2025, Sewell was charged with assault and committing an offence while on bail in relation to a fight which occurred during the march.

On Sunday 31 August 2025, Sewell was one of the keynote speakers at the March for Australia rally in Melbourne CBD. This rally was controversial in the wider community due to its links to neo-Nazis and far-right figures. During the protest, a group from the NSN broke away from the protest and stormed Camp Sovereignty. Sewell was amongst those caught on video during the incident, in which Indigenous Australians were attacked. He was arrested outside a Melbourne court on 2 September 2025 in connection with the incident, along with NSN member Nathan Bull and a third man. Sewell was charged with 25 offences including violent disorder, affray, assault and discharging a missile. Bail was refused at a court hearing on 4 September 2025. In refusing the application, the magistrate stated that no conditions could adequately reduce the risk Sewell posed to the community. While in prison, Sewell was placed in protective custody. In November 2025, he was released on bail with a surety of $20,000—paid by his fiancee—after spending 72 days in remand. On 26 March 2026, Sewell was committed to stand trial in the County Court. Sewell and other NSN members pled guilty for their roles in the attacks on 28 October 2026.

=== 2026–present ===
In March 2026, Sewell appeared in a vodcast with notorious American neo-Nazi James Mason. In May 2026, the Australian Government banned groups formed by former members of the NSN (which had disbanded in January), under new hate crime laws.

== Views ==
Sewell is a neo-Nazi. Sewell has publicly stated that he is a "political soldier for the white race and Adolf Hitler is my leader". He associates with other well-known neo-Nazis, including Neil Erikson who has also been a member of the UPF and the Lads Society.

Sewell is known for his violent promotion of National Socialism. The organisations that he has led promote white supremacy and far-right politics. They echo White genocide myths, claiming that white Australians are being "denigrated, attacked and replaced with foreigners". A leaked manual from Sewell's groups revealed how their members manipulate social media and journalists to gain publicity, amplify messaging and help them recruit new members. Sewell also appeals to "marginalized, underemployed young Australians in the fringes of society". In the leaked material Sewell has outlined plans to create "Anglo-European" enclaves in Australian cities. Sewell's stated goal was to encourage the "speed and ferocity of the decay" of society and to help foment a "race war" by exploiting issues raised by politicians. In August 2024, it was reported that Sewell was leading a cell of the Active Club in South Australia known as Croweater. (Note: Croweater is a popular Australian demonym for South Australian people.) Active Clubs attempt to attract young men under the guise of "training in sport or physical combat and fraternity". Sewell was suspended from X in July 2024, but the Croweater page remains, featuring a photo of masked members carrying a banner reading "Australia for the white man".

In an interview in 2019, Sewell was quoted as saying that he would see violence against minorities as an option "if the state continues its persecution of our people for wanting to preserve their culture and heritage". In a June 2024 podcast, Sewell falsely claimed that authorities in the United Kingdom had threatened to remove children from families because of their parent's political views. Sewell then said that he would commit acts of terrorism and encourage his followers to do likewise if the courts began ordering children to be removed from neo-Nazi parents. In the podcast, Sewell stated that "[w]e want a white Australia for our children so they have a home to live in in the future". When asked by ABC News if recommending violence was acceptable, he stated that "terrorising white Australians for their political beliefs" would result in an "irreversible chain of events". Kristy Campion, who studies Australian far-right extremism, stated that central to the NSN's worldview "is the belief that if they do not act, it will be their children who suffer". She stated that far-right terrorists have repeatedly justified violent acts on the basis of their children.

In 2025, Sewell posted a video of Elon Musk's straight-arm salute, describing it as a "Donald Trump White Power moment".

== Personal life ==
Sewell holds dual citizenship (Australian and New Zealand).

He is married and has two daughters.

At the time of his arrest in September 2025, Sewell was unemployed.
