= United Patriots Front =

Far-right extremist group

- Predecessor: Reclaim Australia
- Formation: 2015
- Dissolved: 2019
- Purpose: Islamophobia; Australian nationalism White supremacy
- Location: Victoria, Australia

The United Patriots Front (UPF) was an Australian far-right extremist group that opposed immigration, multiculturalism and the religion of Islam. Formed in 2015, the group has been largely dormant since their Facebook page was deleted following the 2019 Christchurch mosque shootings.

Based in the state of Victoria, UPF was a nationalist group that formed following a schism in the anti-Islamic Reclaim Australia group. The group has been described by a number of media outlets and journalists as a hate group.

The group also had an antisemitism agenda and several members were neo-Nazis. In 2015, its leaders discussed Jewish conspiracy theories, with Neil Erikson stating that "My personal opinion is stick to the Muslim shit and Cultural Marxism for max support, do Jews later. You don't need to show your full hand." Blair Cottrell replied that it was his "current attitude as well. It will take years to prepare for the Jewish problem. If any of us came out with it now we would be slaughtered by public opinion."

== History ==
Formation

In 2014, several people who would later become the UPF attended the Bendigo mosque protests, opposing the construction of a mosque and Islamic community centre in the Australian regional city of Bendigo. The United Patriots Front was formed in May 2015 when founding members split from Reclaim Australia, due to a dispute that links to the extreme-right group Australian Defence League were giving an unwanted image of Reclaim Australia.

2015

In May, UPF members clashed with anti-racism protesters on the steps of Richmond Town Hall in Melbourne, when about 70 UPF members were met with a counter-protest of around 300 protesters from the group Campaign Against Racism and Fascism. Anti-racist protesters chanted "Muslims are welcome, racists are not" and one man from the UPF was charged with weapons offences. The UPF was protesting against an anti-racism forum organised by local councillor Stephen Jolly of the Socialist Party. Protesters from Campaign Against Racism and Fascism called the members of UPF Nazis.

In June, the group protested Zaky Mallah's appearance on Q&A, a television programme, by roasting a pig outside the Melbourne office of the ABC in an apparent attempt to deliberately upset Muslims.

On 23 July, Victoria Police Commissioner Graham Ashton confirmed a firearm was seized in Sydney from a man who was travelling to the rally on 18 July.

In August, Fairfax Media reported that Erikson was under investigation for alleged conversations with an unknown person threatening councillor Stephen Jolly.

In September, the group announced that they would contest the Senate at the upcoming 2016 federal election. The group also distributed pamphlets to municipal, state, and federal government figures that attacked the Bendigo mayor. The pamphlet was interpreted as a threat by one official.

In October, Blair Cottrell replaced Burgess as chairman of the United Patriots Front.

In October, the group beheaded a dummy outside the Bendigo City Council chambers to protest the 2015 Parramatta shooting and approval to construct a mosque in Bendigo. A leader of the local anti-mosque group disassociated from the UPF. They later held a demonstration in Rosalind Park which attracted around 1,000 supporters in conjunction with the World Wide Rally for Humanity, which was a global anti-Islam rally. A Victorian police officer said that most protesters who came to protest in Bendigo travelled from other Australian states. On the eve of the proposed 10 October rally in Bendigo, the group was belittled by Victorian Premier Daniel Andrews, who said that most of them "wouldn't be able to spell Bendigo".

In November, the group stated its intention to start a political party called Fortitude. However, it failed to sign up the 500 members needed for registration.

Author John Safran said that members of the 19CC Motorcycle Club had been associating with the UPF. The club's patch featured a red crucifix with the words "No FGM". The 'CC' in the club's name reportedly stood for Citizen Crusaders. An administrator of the group's Facebook page was featured in a video with Australia First Party chairman Jim Saleam. Cottrell told Neil Mitchell his organisation would "only be violent if they needed to defend themselves".

2016

In February, leader Blair Cottrell was mocked after being photographed purchasing a meal from a halal-certified fast-food restaurant, despite his vocal opposition to halal certification and support for boycotts of certified businesses and products.

On April 1, United Patriots Front was criticised for unfurling banner with the words "Stop the Mosques" at an Australian Football League match at the Melbourne Cricket Ground. Football officials condemned the UPF supporters, for action described as being "offensive", "disgusting" and "racist" for their involvement with the banner. On 10 April, the banner was displayed at another Australian Football League game in Perth. The UPF members were removed from the grounds and the banner confiscated.

2017

In September 2017, members Blair Cottrell, Neil Erikson and Chris Shortis were found guilty by a magistrate of inciting contempt against Muslims after they had enacted and made a video of a fake beheading, in order to protest against the building of a mosque in Bendigo. Each was fined $2,000.

On 5 September, UPE members disrupted a meeting of the City of Yarra council in protest of their decision to stop referring to January 26 as Australia Day.

2018

In January, the UPF attempted to arrange vigilante patrols after federal politician Peter Dutton falsely claimed that people in Melbourne were "scared to go out to restaurants" because of "African gang violence".

In August, News Corp news outlet Sky News Australia was heavily criticised for providing a platform to Cottrell in a one-on-one discussion about immigration. Sky News reporter Laura Jayes took offence at his appearance on the program due to the fact that he has expressed admiration for Hitler and claimed to have manipulated women "using violence and terror". She described Cottrell as a "fascist" and an "arsehole". The political editor of Sky News, David Speers, was also critical of Cottrell's appearance on the show, stating: "I have just arrived back in the country tonight to be met with the understandable outrage over this... as News Director Greg Byrnes says, it was wrong to have this guy on Sky News." Sky News commentator and former Labor Party minister Craig Emerson resigned in protest after the interview was broadcast, stating that "My father fought Nazis in WWII and was interned in a German POW camp," and that the decision to give Cottrell a platform on Sky News was "another step in a journey to normalising racism & bigotry in our country" During the fallout and criticisms over the interview Cottrell tweeted about raping reporter Laura Jayes, saying via Twitter that "I might as well have raped @ljayes (Sky News political reporter Laura Jayes) on the air, not only would she have been happier with that but the reaction would've been the same." Jayes responded stating that Cottrell is "not just a fascist. He's down right dangerous". Activist groups called on advertisers to pull advertising campaigns off Sky News in the wake of the channel's interview with Cottrell.

2019

In January 2019, UPF leaders, Erikson and Cottrell, promised to unleash a Cronulla-style race riot on Melbourne. On 5 January, around 100 far-right protesters turned up at St Kilda beach to stage a rally and were confronted by about 200 anti-racist protesters and a strong police presence.

On the 16th of March, Several UPF members were captured on video assaulting a 17-year-old boy, after the boy crushed an egg on the back of Senator Anning's head while he was speaking at a political meeting in the Melbourne suburb of Moorabbin. The teenager reportedly egged Anning in response to comments made by the senator about the Christchurch mosque shootings in New Zealand, claiming that Muslim immigration had led to the attacks. Anning threw two punches at the boy. Erikson and a number of other UPF members tackled the boy to the ground, putting him in a headlock and repeatedly kicking and punching him. The teenager was arrested and later released pending further inquiries. Victoria Police said the incident would be being investigated "in its entirety", including Anning's actions.

On the 23rd of March, in the wake of the Christchurch mosque attack, it emerged that the alleged perpetrator, Brenton Tarrant, had three years earlier given fulsome praise to Cottrell as a leader of the far-right movements. He made more than 30 comments on the UPF and True Blue Crew Facebook pages, singling out Cottrell for praise and disparaging Erikson and Burgess as "useful idiots".

Scott Moerland, a senior figure in the United Patriots Front, contested the 2019 Federal Election running as a candidate for former Queensland senator Fraser Anning's Conservative National Party. Anning had previously stated that he would not endorse anyone associated with UPF; however, he had spoken at the UPF rally in January.

== Former members ==
Shermon Burgess

Shermon Burgess is a former council worker from New South Wales, who was a founding member of the UPF. Burgess quit the group in October 2015 after being mocked by other UPF members online, naming Victorian leader Blair Cottrell as the new leader.

Burgess, formerly described as a neo-Nazi, was also a member of Australian Defence League and Reclaim Australia. He converted to Islam in 2023.

Blair Cottrell

Former leader Cottrell is a convicted criminal and has been described by numerous media outlets and Australia's Race Discrimination Commissioner, Tim Soutphommasane, as a neo-Nazi. Besides other run-ins with the law, in September 2017, UPF leaders Cottrell, Neil Erikson, and Christopher Shortis, were found guilty by a magistrate of inciting contempt against Muslims, and each was fined $2,000.

In October 2015, Blair Cottrell replaced Burgess as chairman of the United Patriots Front. Cottrell stirred controversy over his criminal convictions (which include arson, stalking, making threats to kill (Offences against the Person Act 1861), violating the Racial and Religious Tolerance Act 2001 by inciting contempt against Muslims and breaching intervention orders), and for several of his public statements, including a desire to see a portrait of Adolf Hitler hung in Australian classrooms and for copies of Mein Kampf to be "issued annually" to students. Cottrell has denied supporting Nazism. He announced the formation of a political party, Fortitude, which folded after failing to muster enough members to register. Cottrell was the leader of the UPF until the group split in 2017.

Neil Erikson

Erikson was one of the founders of UPF, and came to national prominence for a verbal attack on former Labor senator Sam Dastyari in a Melbourne bar, in which he called the Iranian-born Dastyari a "terrorist" and a "little monkey" and telling him to "go back home".

Erikson is a neo-Nazi and convicted criminal whose convictions include assault, inciting contempt against Muslims, stalking, affray and riotous behaviour. Along with Cottrell and Shortis, he is associated with the secretive far-right fight club, Lads Society.

In 2014, Erikson was convicted of stalking after calling Rabbi Dovid Gutnick and threatening him to "Give me the money Jew or else I will get you".

Chris Shortis

Chris Shortis was one of the founding members and often referred to in the media as one of the group's leaders. A convicted criminal, Shortis is also a member of the Australia First Party.

== See also ==
- Thomas Sewell
- Australian Defence League
- English Defence League
- Australia First Party
- Antipodean Resistance Australian neo-Nazi group that emerged around the same time as Reclaim Australia.
- Australia First Party Australian far-right political party associated with Reclaim Australia.
- Australian Liberty Alliance
- Far-right politics in Australia
- Islamophobia in Australia
- Lads Society
- National Action (Australia) Australian neo-Nazi group.
- Q Society
- Reclaim Australia
- Soldiers of Odin (apparently defunct as of late 2016)
- True Blue Crew - Reclaim Australia splinter group
- Ultranationalism
- White nationalism
