= True Blue Crew =

Australian far-right extremist group

- Abbreviation: TBC
- Founder: Kane Miller
- Founded at: Melton, Victoria, Australia
- Type: Far-right
- Purpose: Anti-immigration; Anti-Islam; Anti-multiculturalism; Far-right politics Hinduphobia; Antisemitism; Homophobia
- Region served: Victoria
- Leader: Kane Miller
- Affiliations: United Patriots Front (UPF), Reclaim Australia
- Formerly called: Reclaim Australia
- Split from Reclaim Australia

The True Blue Crew (TBC) was an Australian far-right extremist group. Members and supporters have been linked to right-wing terrorism and vigilantism, and members have been arrested with weapons and on terrorism-related charges. Experts who have studied the group say it appears to be "committed to violence".

The group rose to prominence as an anti-Islam group in 2015, and shifted more towards anti-immigration in response to public sentiment and police crackdowns.

== History ==
=== 2014: Bendigo mosque protests ===
Beginning in 2014, members of what would become the True Blue Crew were involved in the "Voices of Bendigo" and "Stop the Mosque" Bendigo protests. A number of far-right groups, including the Q Society, Reclaim Australia, the Australian Defence League and the United Patriots Front opposed the construction of a mosque and Islamic community centre in Bendigo, Victoria.

The True Blue Crew was formed in 2015 as a splinter group from the anti-Islamic Reclaim Australia group, along with a number of small far-right nationalist groups such as the United Patriots Front.

=== 2016: Melton mosque protests ===
In May 2016, the group attended an anti-mosque protest in Melton along with members of the United Patriots Front and the Love Australia or Leave Party. About 150 people attended, opposing a housing development which they falsely claimed was being built for Muslims only. As the crowd dispersed following a similar protest in August the same year, fighting broke out between members of the True Blue Crew and anti-Muslim vigilante group the Sons of Odin.

=== 2018: Vigilantism ===
In January 2018, United Patriots Front and True Blue Crew were reported by Seven News to be attempting to arrange vigilante patrols to monitor young African Australian men. The report led to accusations that Channel 7 were giving neo-Nazis a speech platform.

== Links to terrorism and violence ==
On 25 June 2016, police seized weapons including a knife and knuckle duster during an "Australian Pride" rally.

=== Phillip Galea ===
In August 2016, a member of True Blue Crew, Phillip ("Phil") Galea, was charged with terrorism-related offences. Galea had ordered ingredients for explosives, and video footage seized in raids showed Galea carrying out reconnaissance of a possible target. His intended targets were various "leftist" organisations in Melbourne, including Trades Hall in Carlton, the Melbourne Anarchist Club in Northcote, and the Resistance Centre in the Melbourne CBD. Galea's intentions were to cause as much devastation to these locations as possible, in a coordinated attack involving smoke bombs and improvised explosive devices. At court, it was outlined that his aims were to eliminate the leaders of the left in Melbourne, blaming them for the "Islamisation" of Australia. Galea had researched homemade bombs, ballistic armour and guns, and had prepared a terrorist document entitled Patriot’s Cookbook, intended to be a how-to guide for far-right terrorists.

Galea was also a supporter or member of Right Wing Resistance Australia, the United Patriots Front, Patriots Defence League Australia, and the openly neo-Nazi group Combat 18, as well as TBC and Reclaim Australia.

He was convicted in December 2019 of plotting terrorist attacks and creating a document likely to facilitate a terrorist act. He was sentenced to maximum of twelve years in jail, with a nine-year minimum in December 2020. Prominent anti-fascist observer and commentator Andy Fleming saw Galea's conviction as reflecting "the decline of extreme- and far-right groups and organising projects, including... Reclaim Australia and The True Blue Crew".

=== Links to Christchurch mosque shooter ===
In the wake of the Christchurch mosque shootings in March 2019, it emerged that the perpetrator, Brenton Tarrant, had three years earlier given fulsome praise to Blair Cottrell as a leader of the far-right movements on social media. He made more than 30 comments on the now deleted UPF and TBC Facebook pages, singling out Cottrell for praise and disparaging Neil Erikson and Shermon Burgess as "useful idiots". The group was banned from Facebook after posting Islamophobic messages in the wake of the Christchurch massacre.

== Political links ==
Members of TBC have been linked to One Nation candidate Nikhil Reddy, with members of both groups volunteering for one another.

== See also ==
- Australia First Party, a far-right political party associated with Reclaim Australia
- Far-right politics in Australia
- Far-right terrorism in Australia
- Islamophobia in Australia
- Racism in Australia
- Australian Liberty Alliance
