= African gangs moral panic =

Moral panic in Australia

The African gangs moral panic, sometimes referred to as the African gangs narrative, was a moral panic relating to the supposed presence of Sudanese-Australian and South Sudanese-Australians criminal gangs in Melbourne, Australia. The most intense period of the panic occurred over 32 months between March 2016 and November 2018, in the run up to the Victorian state elections of 2018.

The trigger for the panic was clashes between young people and the police at the Moomba Festival on 12 March 2016, after which members of the Victorian Liberal Party and the Australian media, especially the Herald Sun newspaper, made frequent reference to an "African gang" problem in Melbourne. During the panic, newspapers amplified any criminal activity committed, or alleged to be committed, by people of African origin, routinely publishing and focusing on the ethnicity of alleged offenders. This generated further comments from politicians, pressure on the police to take harsh action against the supposed threat, and led to fear amongst White-Australians which was reported by the media, in a cycle which fuelled the moral panic.

Despite the salience of this discourse in the media, police and community organisations denied the existence of criminal gangs among the Sudanese-Australian community.

The media and political focus on Sudanese-Australians and crime in Melbourne declined sharply after the 2018 elections, but the effects of negative stereotyping, over-policing and racialisation of crime are still felt by the Sudanese community, and Black people generally, in Melbourne and across Australia. Melburnians of Sudanese origin report feeling distrust of the police and nervousness of gathering in public for fear of harassment by law enforcement.

== History ==
=== Before 2016 ===
Australia has a history of moral panics regarding immigrant criminality, specifically related to real or supposed "gangs" from communities involved in recent waves of immigration. The folk devil in these panics has varied according to time and location; in modern Sydney, Muslim and Arab immigrants have taken over from the Italian and Greek communities that were the cause of concern in the 1970s and 1980s, whereas in Melbourne and Perth discourse around gangs has centred on Asian groups.

From the mid-1990s to 2011, 27,679 people who were born in Sudan migrated to Australia, mostly as refugees, with the peak years of settlement between 2002 and 2006. This wave of African migration led to the creation of gang stereotypes similar to those which had been used to characterise previous newly arrived migrant communities. By 2004, the Australian press was already using the term "African gang" to categorise fights between youngsters of African origin.

==== Murder of Liep Gony and the events of 2007 ====
In 2007, Liep Gony, a 19-year-old refugee who had migrated from Sudan in 1999, was badly beaten in the Melbourne suburb of Noble Park, dying from his injuries 24 hours later. Despite the fact it later emerged that Gony had been murdered by white assailants, the immediate response to Gony's murder from politicians and the press was to frame it as an example of "African gang" violence.

Soon after the murder, Kevin Andrews, the minister for immigration, declared, "some groups of immigrants aren't settling and adjusting into the Australian life as quickly as we would hope." Initial press reports took the position that the murder was an example of "ethnic gang violence", basing their stories on off-the-record comments from anonymous police officers and local residents, with Andrews stating that officers had told him Melbourne had "a serious Sudanese gang problem." However, at the time of the murder, Melbourne Police's Multicultural Liaison officer told The Australian that police often mistook innocent groups of Black youths for gangs.

When it became clear that Gony had been murdered by two white men, Andrews declined to apologise for his comments on Sudanese-Australians, stating "I'm not proposing to apologise for saying what people are concerned about." Minister Andrews was also reticent to comment on the white attackers who beat another Sudanese man in an openly racist attack the day after Gony's funeral, which sociologist Joel Windle contrasts with his immediate condemnation of an attack by Sudanese youths on a policeman as "un-Australian". Clashes between Sudanese youth and police occurred on several occasions between September and December, with police accounts of the violence in one alleged "riot" contradicted by witnesses. In the aftermath of the events, the Liberal party presented the murder and assaults in Melbourne as examples of a "failure of integration", and cited them as justification for a reduction in the percentage of humanitarian visas given to Africans from 70% to 30%.

In his analysis of reporting on the events around Gony's murder, Windle highlights the process of racialisation by which the Australian and the Herald Sun universally labelled non-white individuals with ethnic markers when discussing them, contrasting this with the assumed default de-racialised status of whiteness when discussing anonymous "locals". He also notes the frequent negative use of language in association with these ethnic markers, especially around groups of young people.

Language used in newspaper articles to describe ethnic groups in Melbourne between 26 September 2007 and 6 December 2007
Group	Racial attributes	Collective attributes	Age attributes	Migration attributes	Locality	Moral quality
Racialised African refugees	African, North African, Of African descent, Black, Sudanese, Sudanese-born	a mob, packs, a gang, gangs, a group, community	youth(s), kids, children, under-age, teenagers, teens, juvenile	refugees, immigrants, migrants	residents	delinquent, lawless, thugs, offenders
De-racialised "local" sources	White, Caucasian, Non-African	the community, the people	[age]-year-old	long-term Australians, locally-born	locals, residents, long-time residents, home-grown neighbours, local businesses	

==== Murder of Alex Ngong Akok ====
Two years later, in Adelaide, Alex Ngong Akok, a young man of African background, was murdered, with the attack again presented by the media in terms which criminalised the victim. Despite the attack being committed by white youths, the local press published details of court charges he was facing, speculated that there was a gang link and suggested that his murder constituted "retaliation".

=== Height of the panic (2016–2018) ===
The immediate trigger for the moral panic around "gangs" in Melbourne was a "riot" at the Moomba Festival in 2016. In the two years prior to the festival, there were a total of four articles published in Melbourne's two most popular newspapers, The Age and the Herald Sun which mentioned the words Sudanese and gang, whereas in the two years which followed it there were 130. Similarly, in the two-year-period preceding the festival, there were only two mentions of the supposed "Apex Gang", which would become a prominent feature of racialised discourse on crime, neither of them connecting it to a specific ethnicity.

The panic fizzled out following the Labor victory in the Victorian State Election of 2018, after which the media and Coalition politicians stopped aggressively pushing the African gangs narrative. The period of intense media and political attention on Melbourne's Sudanese community lasted around 32 months.

==== Moomba Festival clashes and the Apex Gang ====
On the night of 12 March 2016, clashes broke out at Melbourne's annual Moomba Festival, a family orientated festival held in central Melbourne. Reports on the evening suggested that brawls had occurred involving young people largely from African-Australian and Pacific-Islander backgrounds. Several incidents of vandalism and disorder occurred at the festival, with news reports suggesting that the fights had broken out between two separate groups of young people. There were also reports, based on accounts by festival-goers, of young men of Sudanese-Australian origin picking fights with other festival-goers. The disturbances culminated in members of the police employing capsicum spray to disperse a group of young men and boys in Federation Square. Following the events, the Chief Commissioner of Victoria Police stated that that the heavy police presence may have caused an escalation in the violence, interviews with Sudanese-Australians who attended the festival also suggest this to be the case. Videos of the events quickly emerged and were published on Australian media websites, often embedded in articles which made reference to "ethnic gangs". They typically showed dark-skinned individuals who outnumber police and appear to be acting in a threatening manner.

In the days which followed the clashes at Moomba, a media narrative emerged which placed the blame for the events on a group it identified as the Apex Gang, which was alleged to consist principally of Sudanese-Australians. Editorials and news articles regarding Apex first appeared in the Herald Sun, and the story was then picked up by local news channels and other newspapers. Melbourne paper The Age initially echoed the coverage of the Herald Sun, however, within a few weeks it ceased to include ethnic descriptors in its coverage and in time began to question aspects of the narrative. The narratives also suggested a surge in crime rates was affecting Melbourne due to the activities of this gang. These sensationalistic stories were often translated into Chinese and spread among Melbourne's Chinese student community on WeChat channels, creating panic and widespread fear of people of African origin.

The Herald Sun reported that the clashes had been caused by armed teenage street gangs and the alleged existence of the Sudanese Apex Gang was rejected by local police leaders. A survey of the local Sudanese population also suggest that the gang did not exist, seemingly being little more than a social media phenomenon symbolising an anti-social attitude or lifestyle. Sudanese-residents of Melbourne interviewed between 2017 and 2019 stated that violence at Moomba 2016 was heavily exaggerated, and that press attention was immediately focused on people of African origin, despite the participation of people of various ethnicities, due to racism in the Australian media and population. Lee et al. describe Apex as "a media confected crime gang" and suggest that the name had initially covered an "unstructured group of young people" from various ethnic backgrounds but had come to serve as a stand in for Sudanese Australians.

==== Media escalation of the panic (2016–2017) ====
In the months following the disorder at the 2016 Moomba Festival, the press linked the Apex Gang to a string of carjackings, assaults and burglaries. Despite police, experts and alleged gang members denying the existence of gangs in Melbourne, Apex had become a folk devil representing what Lee et al. describe as "a broader crime threat that drew on xenophobic discourses that extended to border protection, anti-immigration fears, and a fear of terrorism." Apex became a racialised term by which crime could be linked to the Sudanese community.

The African gangs narrative was picked up by broadcast media, which employed the testimony of crime victims when available as well as the use of CCTV footage. Crimes with no clear link to gangs were often framed within the racialised narrative of the Apex gang, as evidence of an out of control crime problem. The Nine Network's A Current Affair broadcast a report in July suggesting that Melburnians had been forced to arm themselves with baseball bats due to a series of home invasions. The programme suggested that the criminal justice system in the city had failed.

At the 2017 Moomba Festival, 53 arrests were made and the press focused its discussion on the Apex gang. However, 14 of these arrests were for being drunk and disorderly, and the Melbourne police stated that those arrested came from all parts of Melbourne and that the offences were not gang or race related. Soon after the festival, the police commissioner stated that the Apex gang did not currently exist, and when it had, it was not an ethnically based group.

In May 2017, A Current Affair broadcast an episode entitled "Apex Vigilante" which again suggested that victims of crime had been forced into vigilantism due to the supposed collapse of law and order in Melbourne.

In Spring of 2017, Federal Member of Parliament Jason Wood, who was chair of the Joint Standing Committee on Migration, published an article in the Herald Sun based on crime statistics relating to the Sudanese community and stating, "With South Sudanese hugely over represented in violent crimes in Victoria, the protection of all those living in Melbourne and Australia must come first."

==== Political controversy and the Victorian state election (late 2017–2018) ====
Political controversy around alleged African gangs would play a prominent role in the lead up to the Victorian elections of 2018. Both politicians and media made frequent use of the adjectives African and Sudanese in connection with crime and violence during this period. Research with journalists working on crime stories also report a strong push from media organisations for the inclusion of an "African crime" angle in news stories at this time.

In December 2017, the Liberal-led Australian Parliamentary Joint Standing Committee on Migration published a report which referred to an increase in gang activity and falsely suggested that Sudanese Australians were responsible for 1.4% of crime in Victoria. The report used the term gangs throughout, despite the Victorian police position that no such gangs existed. Following this publication, Jason Wood was quoted in The Australian saying, "A lot of migrants have no understanding of the law. I was told by South Sudanese people that ... breaking into someone’s house and stealing a car is not a big deal." This statement was followed by a series of sensationalist articles in the Herald Sun on alleged incidents which purportedly involved Sudanese youth. The reports regularly focused on the ethnicity of the alleged offender, specifically using the terms "African appearance", "gang" and "feral thugs".

The same month, a series of events were portrayed in the press as constituting an African crime wave, especially in titles from the Newscorp stable. These incidents included a street brawl, a party at an Airbnb which led to property damage, and the alleged assault of a police officer making an arrest; all of which were reported as being the work of people of African appearance. The coverage of these events in the Herald Sun and the Australian edition of the Daily Mail presented the brawl in populist racial terms, and incited a response from politicians. The then Prime Minister Malcolm Turnbull, Victorian Conservative Greg Hunt and Federal Immigration Minister Peter Dutton all gave statements relating to the reported gang problem in Victoria, with Dutton stating:

People are scared to go out to restaurants of a nighttime because they’re followed home by these gangs, home invasion and cars are stolen ... [Politicians] need to call it for what it is, "of course it’s African gang violence".

In addition to this, Dutton spread the blame to the wider community, saying "if people are not prepared to integrate by sending their children to school and preventing them wandering the streets at night committing offences, they don’t belong in Australian society". Dutton's comments on Melburnians being frightened to go out at night met with widespread mockery on social media from members of the Sudanese community, and were contradicted by Victorian Labor politicians, Victoria Police Commissioner Graham Ashton and members of the Victorian public.

Turnbull offered support for Dutton, suggesting that the Victorian Premier, Daniel Andrews lacked the will to "tackle the gang problem on the streets of Melbourne". This view was echoed by Greg Hunt, the Federal Minister for Health, who stated: "We know that African gang crime in some areas is clearly out of control. [...] The failure is not police, but the Premier." Former Prime Minister Tony Abbott challenged the Victorian government's denials of the existence of African gangs in Melbourne in a 2018 radio interview.

In January 2018, Channel 7 aired an interview with leader of the neo-fascist United Patriots Front, Blair Cottrell. The report showed a meeting of the True Blue Crew far-right vigilante group with members of the United Patriots Front, relayed their concerns about "gang violence committed by young African men" and stated the organisations had "come together to help average Australians deal with what they are calling an immigrant crime crisis."

At various points in 2018, A Current Affair produced reports suggesting Melbourne police were not being allowed to deal with "African gang crime", culminating in a report entitled "Cops gone soft?". This programme contained interviews with former senior police officers who suggested the rank and file officers were not dealing with young criminals because they were scared of repercussions from management.

This political discourse coupling questions of race and immigration led to an increase in anti-immigration posting on social media and web-based media articles. It also stimulated the re-emergence of far-right groups such as Reclaim Australia, which shifted its focus from Muslims to supposed African Gangs. The press and politicians frequently apportioned parental communal blame for the supposed crime wave, and suggested that the root of the problem was a failure of integration on the part of the Sudanese.

The Liberal Party's campaign for the Victorian elections held on 24 November 2018 focused heavily on law and order, in what Weng and Mansouri described as a "fear campaign". However, this met with limited success, as the election resulted in a victory for the incumbent Labor administration. Following the election, the media attention paid to questions related to "African gangs" and supposed immigrant crime reduced drastically.

== Crime in Melbourne during the panic ==
While media reports in the 2016–2018 timeframe focused heavily on crimes committed by people of African origin, in reality figures released by the Crime Statistics Agency in 2018 showed that they were responsible for only 1% of crimes in Victoria. This was in excess of their share of the population, which was 0.14%, but this is not unusual given the fact that most crimes are committed by people between 16 and 24 years of age, and the Sudanese Australian population is over-represented in that cohort.

A great deal of media attention was directed to the offence of aggravated burglary. This offence did have a significant over-representation of Sudanese-Australians, but again the total only represented 4.8%, with the vast majority of offences being committed by White Australians.

Molla states that, despite the "hyperbolic reporting", crime rates were actually lower in Victoria than in other states. Furthermore, in terms of youth crime, the number of youth offenders in Victoria (population 6,526,400) was 8,182, in New South Wales (population 8,046,100) it was 17,972, while in Queensland (population 5,052,800) it was 11,699.

Lee and colleagues write that between 2009 and 2019, youth crime in Victoria decreased by 34.9%. This meant that the state was the focus of a panic about youth crime during a period when the actual youth crime rate was falling drastically.

== Analysis of the moral panic ==
The term Moral panic was popularised by sociologist Stanley Cohen in the 1970s. It describes the process by which the media use sensational headlines and melodramatic language to exaggerate events and actors, creating fear of supposed threats to the safety of society and othering groups which are identified as source of this threat. Cohen specifically applied the term to the interplay of crime reporting and social reaction in the UK. He states that a moral panic will emerge when "a condition, episode, person or group of persons emerges to become defined as a threat to societal values and interests; its nature is presented in a stylized and stereotypical fashion by the mass media," and this media focus is echoed by politicians and experts. These targeted groups are referred to by Cohen as folk devils. He notes that use of the concept of a moral panic does not require the problem to be inexistent, merely exaggerated, usually in a way which is conditioned by the ideology of the dominant sector of society.

=== Academic interpretations of the African gangs panic ===
The political and media storm around so-called African gangs of 2016–2018 is described by academics as an example of a moral panic.

Tebeje Molla notes that while racialised moral panics around crime and immigration are not unusual around the world, the intensity of the panic around "African Gangs" in Melbourne was exceptional. However, Molla also notes that, unlike in classic moral panics, where "experts" play a key role in the escalation of the panic, the police, statistical bodies and local authorities in Victoria resisted the narrative and denied the existence of a gang problem. John Gaffey also views it as an atypical panic, in that experts resisted the narrative.

Gatwiri and Anderson view African gangs panic as part of a continual series of ideologically motivated racialised moral panics which are a response to social change in Australia. They state that panics flourish because they "obscure meaningful critical analysis of the validity of these panics and instead allow for a projection of anxieties and fears onto minoritized others who can easily be scapegoated through these events." They also argue that while moral panics abate, the negative representations of African-ness and its coding as criminal have permanent negative effects on African communities in Australia.

Lee and colleagues state that while the punitive narratives in the media and politics tying Sudanese young people to crime contained elements of a moral panic, there was more to them than just structural factors. They argue that offending behaviour can stem from members of marginalised communities taking pleasure in transgressive actions. They also indicate that evidence from interviews suggests that the media attention and scapegoating incited Sudanese youth to take part in antisocial activities, and that the widespread coverage of the supposed "Apex gang" may actually have caused youths to create a real gang of that name.

Kounmoris and Blaustein view the events of 2016–2018 as "a multi-mediated moral panic". They point to the relevance and similarity of Stuart Hall et al.'s 1978 study of a racialised moral panic around mugging in the UK to the Melbourne panic. In their view, the African gangs panic is a case study which brings Hall's analysis up to date into the new fragmented media landscape of 24-hour news, online news sources and social media.

=== Causes of the panic ===
==== Racism ====
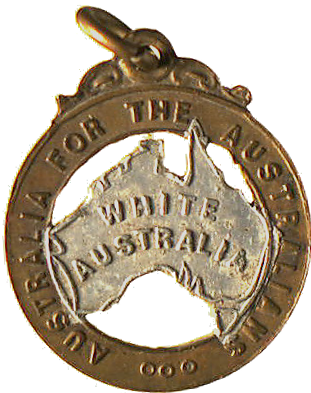
The Australian Natives' Association, comprising Australian-born whites, produced this badge in 1911. The presence of people of African descent was a trigger for the adoption of the White Australia policy.

Black people in modern Australia suffer a high degree of racial discrimination, with the 2018 Australian Human Rights Commission report stating "the five groups that experienced the highest level of racial discrimination were those born in South Sudan, Zimbabwe, Kenya, Ethiopia and those who identified as Indigenous."

Australia has a long history of official and unofficial racism towards black Africans, reflected in the White Australia policy, in effect from 1901 until the 1970s, which prohibited the immigration of black Africans, among other non-White groups. Prior to the policy's implementation, small numbers of black Africans and African-Americans were resident in Australia, and their presence was explicitly mentioned in the discussions on the restriction of non-white immigration.

Following the end of this policy, despite Australia becoming more ethnically diverse, negative stereotypes around black Africans remained prominent in Australian culture. Modern African-Australians are culturally and socially diverse, but Australian society typically views them as a homogenous group, set in opposition to its constructions of whiteness. In Australia, "Africanness" is associated with a lack of civilisation, disease, dirt, war and poverty; scholars such as Wearing, Jakubowicz, Wickes and others note that this perception is rooted in a social context of racist and discriminatory assumptions about black people.

Current academic literature has highlighted frequent experiences of discrimination, criminalisation and racialisation shaping the interactions of black-African Australians with majority society. In particular, a strong negative association between Africanness and criminality exists in Australian culture, which was reflected in the media's presentation of the events in Melbourne. This has been accompanied by islamophobic rhetoric emerging in the war on terror, where Muslims are racialised as others who are dangerous for Australian society and incidents of criminality are viewed by the media as potential indications of Islamic extremism.

The 2016 Challenging Racism Project found negative attitudes to black people were common in Australia. 21% of respondents felt that African refugees increased crime in Australia, and 16.1% stated they felt "very negative or somewhat negative" towards African Australians. Wickes et al. argue that these attitudes reflect implicit biases widespread in Australia which can cause unconscious discrimination. They consider this to be a factor in both the press and politicians presentation of so-called "African gangs" and the public's reaction to it.

International Studies scholar, Mandisi Majavu also identifies a tendency to identify African Australian men as "towering seven feet 'brutes'" associated with "backwardness, primitiveness, danger and crime" and states that blackness is a source of fear in some whites. Examples of this include a ban on Sudanese students congregating in groups of more than three in Melbourne schools for fear that they may seem threatening. He views this perception of threat as a strong contributory factor to the moral panic.

Australian academics, Kathomi Gatwiri and Leticia Anderson argue that African Australians are defined as "perpetual strangers" within Australian society, and as such are constructed as a threat, sometimes within rhetoric of a "clash of civilisations". They view the African gangs crime panic as forming part of this positioning of the African body as a source of societal danger.

==== Media factors ====
Sections of the Australian media, especially those belonging to the News Corp stable, played a significant role in the development and maintenance of the moral panic around crime and African Australians in Melbourne. This echoes studies on previous moral panics, which identified the key role of the press in distorting and exaggerating reality, thereby exacerbating social anxieties and reactions to a scale disproportionate to the phenomena provoking them. However, Kounmouris and Blaustein, writing in 2021, argue that the advent of a new media landscape following the collapse in the profitability of print media and the structural changes in the newspaper industry it engendered, means that the Australian African gangs moral panic must be studied both in terms of the traditional structural analysis at a societal level and in terms of the granular "mundane aspects of newsmaking".

Anonymous interviews with Australian journalists who had published articles on the "Moomba riot", "Apex", "African gangs" or "the law and order election" found that most of them expressed disillusionment and frustration with the way the subject had been covered by their own papers and the press in general. However, multiple participants felt that the crimes which were reported were newsworthy, and some defended the practice of noting the ethnicity of crime suspects and use of contested terms like "gang" and "thug".

The principal moral entrepreneurs in the panic were the state leadership of the Liberal National Party, who used the concept of "Sudanese gangs" to "construct a narrative about South Sudanese criminality that directly resonated with enduring narratives of black, specifically South Sudanese (i.e. black/migrant), criminality in the Australian context." The journalists surveyed by Kounmouris and Blaustein perceived these political developments as triggers for the "Apex" narrative, which rendered any subsequent incidents of criminality by people of South Sudanese origin newsworthy. However, the journalists recognised that their media organisations had made a choice to amplify the Liberal Nationals' message.

Academics writing on the panic have noted the key role of the Herald Sun newspaper. In the year following the 2016 Moomba festival disturbances, the Herald Sun ran 173 stories mentioning "Apex", including 37 opinion pieces. A third of these stories included the words "African" or "Sudanese". The stories in the Herald Sun were sensationalised and often included language like "hoods", "thugs", "packs" and "gangs". Analysing media reporting on race in 2018, All Together Now found that across the Australian press, 56.5% of reports were negative, 8.5% neutral and 34.9% were "inclusive". A significant proportion of these negative reports came from the Herald Sun and Daily Telegraph. Furthermore, 70% of these negative articles employed "covert techniques" such as dog-whistling, irony and decontextualisation.

The pushback against this racialised threat construction came from academics, left-leaning journalists, members of Victoria's legal profession and community activists, with their rebuttals receiving coverage in mainstream progressive newspapers. In this case, the diversity of Australia's media landscape functioned to offer a challenge to the hegemonic right-wing viewpoint.

Journalists working during this period felt that given low staffing and the prevalence of churnalism, and the need to react instantly due to competition from social media, they were not able to fact-check stories sufficiently. They also felt pressured by editors to include racialised keywords such "apex" in their copy, as this generated online engagement. There was also a perceived pressure for journalists at the Herald Sun to publish stories which conformed to the conservative worldview of their readership, constraining them from refusing to publish unethical content in a way that did not occur at liberal papers like The Age. Despite the more restrained tone at The Age, it still contributed to the creation of the concept of an "African gang threat", especially in the early period of the panic.

A further factor mentioned by journalists at the Herald Sun was the fact they felt their job was to give victims of crime a voice, with this identification with the victim causing them to tolerate "news-making practices that contributed to sensationalised and racialised representations of offenders".

In addition to the press coverage, the Nine Network's A Current Affair programme was a key driver of the multi-mediated moral panic. Gaffey's study of the programme's crime coverage during this period focuses on its centring of experience over expert opinion or statistical data. In the show's reporting, the contradiction between citizens' often indirect "experience" of "gang crime" and the police and other bodies' denial that such a problem existed was presented as a failure of the state to deal with criminality rather than mistaken perception on the part of the public. This prioritising of perception over fact is viewed by Gaffey in terms of the concept of a modern form of parrhesia, in which the voice of experts are consider less truthful than the "experiential" narratives of "ordinary people", who often, in reality, lack direct experience of the subject upon which they are commenting.

== Effects of the panic on Black Australians ==
A 2018 study based in interviews with young Sudanese Australians found that they reported many negative consequences of the media's reporting of the Moomba riot and the subsequent gang narrative. The participants reported that during the panic, there was an increase in racial abuse towards them in public spaces and that individuals with racist views were emboldened to express them, as they felt they had been legitimised and normalised by the media's racialised language. This increase in racist commentary and abuse was also noted by the participants on social media sites like Facebook. Participants also noted being distressed by online comments under reports from media organisations such as Channel Seven which frequently contained virulently racist views and calls for the deportation of Sudanese Australians. The participants noted the lack of comments defending African Australians and perceived these comment sections as "a constant reminder that some segments of the vocal Australian public were fundamentally intolerant of the presence of South Sudanese communities in Australia."

In addition to this exposure to racism, young Sudanese Australians felt that the panic stigmatised them and associated them with criminality, having negative effects on both the personal and communal level. Some young people experienced this as a constant pressure to prove the stereotypes wrong. Others reported that their awareness of the racist element in Australian society and its intolerance towards them, made them suspicious of people outside their group, despite them being aware that the racist element was a minority.

In schools, Sudanese Australians report that the exaggerated reports on the supposed "Apex gang" led to teachers to perceive groups of Sudanese children as potentially criminal gangs, and that groups of Sudanese children were not tolerated. Similarly, Sudanese Australians were insulted with terms reflecting the language of the panic both in school and in public. They further reported frequent microaggressions which led them to question their belonging and worth in Australian society.

The racial profiling of African-Australians by police during the panic led to feelings of being harassed and lacking in freedom of movement and to associate in public with people of their own ethnicity.

Weng and Mansouri note that the process of media othering of both African and Muslim Australians has positioned them as outside the norms of Australian life, as defined by the Anglo-Celtic majority. They argue this constant media focus is damaging to African and Muslim Australians' self-esteem, creates isolation and leads to vilification and discrimination.

The sensations of isolation, shame and being the target of disrespect, triggered by the constant exposure to public manifestations of the negative social consequences of the panic, can lead to psychological harm though the undermining of the positive understanding of the self.

== See also ==
- Anti-African sentiment
- Springfield pet-eating hoax
