= Neil Erikson =

Australian far-right extremist

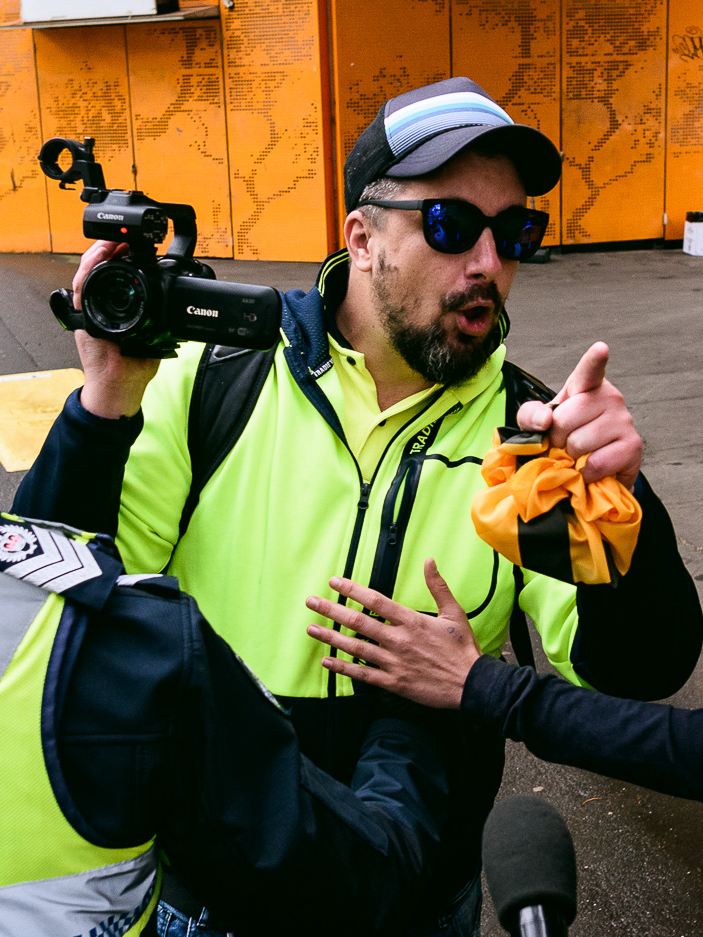
- Erikson in 2019
- Born: 1985 (age 40–41)
- Known for: Founding United Patriots Front; Antisemitism; Far-right activism; Criminal convictions; Neo-Nazism
- Political party: United Patriots Front/Lads Society (2015–present); Conservative Nationals (2019)
- Penalty: Psychological assessment and treatment in the community (stalking); Fined $2000 (inciting contempt against Muslims)

Neil Erikson is an Australian neo-Nazi.

Erikson gained attention after posting a video of himself verbally abusing Iranian-born former Labor senator Sam Dastyari in a Melbourne bar. During the verbal attack, Erikson called Dastyari a "terrorist" and a "little monkey" and told him to "go back home". Erikson espouses the antisemitic canard and Jewish conspiracy theory of cultural Marxism.

Erikson is one of the founders or leaders of the far-right neo-Nazi United Patriots Front and the Lads Society. He has been charged and convicted of multiple offences including assault, inciting contempt against Muslims, stalking, affray and riotous behaviour, making threats to prevent a clergyman discharging duties, and disturbing religious worship.

== Activities ==
=== Stalking ===
In 2014, Erikson was convicted of stalking. Charges were laid after Erikson called Rabbi Dovid Gutnick, threatening and insulting him. He spoke of circumcisions, blood money and Jewish sidelocks, and told Gutnick he knew his location and was coming to get him unless he paid. Magistrate Donna Bakos said Erikson's calls were motivated by prejudice and found he had little remorse for his crime.

=== Islamophobia ===
In September 2017, Erikson (by then a member of the Cooks Convicts) and UPF members Chris Shortis and Blair Cottrell were found guilty of inciting contempt against Muslims after they made a video of a fake beheading while protesting the building of a mosque in Bendigo.

=== Threatening clergyman ===
In 2018, Erikson was charged with making threats to prevent a clergyman discharging duties and disturbing religious worship, after he interrupted a church service at the Gosford Anglican Church by marching into the church dressed as Jesus Christ, holding a whip. As of March 2019, Erikson had outstanding warrants and was wanted by NSW Police regarding an outstanding non-custodial arrest warrant related to the offence.

=== White genocide conspiracy theory ===
In 2018, Erikson attended a rally in Perth run by Liberal MPs Andrew Hastie and Ian Goodenough in support of White South African farmers wanting to immigrate owing to South African farm attacks, a cause drumming up sympathy on the far-right, based partly on the White genocide conspiracy theory.

=== Attending LNP event ===
Also in 2018, Erikson attended a Gold Coast "recruitment event" for the Liberal National Party of Queensland, for which he claims his flights were paid by someone else.

=== Fraser Anning ===
In 2019, Erikson was involved in an altercation between Queensland Senator Fraser Anning and a 17-year-old boy. Erikson was recorded restraining the 17-year-old after the boy crushed an egg on the back of Anning's head while he was speaking at a political meeting in the Melbourne suburb of Moorabbin. The teenager egged Anning in response to comments made by the senator about the Christchurch mosque shootings in New Zealand, claiming that Muslim immigration had led to the attacks. Erikson and a number of other UPF members tackled the boy to the ground, putting him in a headlock and repeatedly kicking and punching him.

=== Further convictions and jail ===
On 11 May 2021, Erikson was sentenced to one month jail at the Melbourne Magistrates Court, after refusing a community correction order and de-radicalisation program. Erikson lodged an appeal against the sentence in the County Court, which was scheduled for August 2021.

On 30 July 2021, Erikson was sentenced in the Melbourne Magistrates Court to 10 weeks jail for hurling homophobic abuse in a church in Hawthorn in May 2019. He was granted bail.

== See also ==
- Australia First Party
- Antisemitism in Australia
- Far-right politics in Australia
- Islamophobia in Australia
- Pauline Hanson's One Nation
- National Socialist Party of Australia
- Reclaim Australia
- Romper Stomper
- True Blue Crew
