= Andrew Fleming (disambiguation) =

Andrew Fleming (born 1963), American director and screenwriter

Andrew or Andy Fleming may also refer to:

- Andrew Fleming (footballer) (born 1989), English footballer
- Andrew Fleming (Shortland Street)
- Andy Fleming (Irish sportsman) (1916–2011), Irish hurler and Gaelic footballer
- Andy Fleming (activist), Australian anarcho-communist journalist, academic, and activist
- Andy Fleming (soccer) (born 1974), American soccer player and coach
- Andrew Fleming (bowls) (born 1972), Welsh international lawn bowler
