= Gavin Boby =

British lawyer

- Born: 1964 or 1965 (age 61–62)
- Occupation: Solicitor
- Known for: Anti-mosque litigation

Gavin Boby (born January 1964) is a British planning lawyer and activist known for his campaigns to use existing legislation to resist planning permission applications for new mosques in the United Kingdom. He describes himself as a "mosque-buster".

== Anti-mosque activities ==
As director of the Law and Freedom Foundation, Boby helps "local neighbourhoods to resist planning applications for mosques". As of 2023, he takes credit for the rejection of 58 out of 95 planning applications for UK mosques which he has contested in the preceding decade. Some councils have however disputed that he has been instrumental in blocking the development of local mosques, instead attributing them to other issues.

In order to legally oppose mosque constructions, he cites issues such as "non-regulation number of parking spaces", and gives advice centring on arguments such as "parking congestion", "disturbance" and "community relations". In speeches in opposition to mosque constructions, he has however referred to mosques' historical uses as "fortresses" and "places of executions", and added that "terrorists form plots in mosques" where "they cannot be detected". His organisation's logo features a mock-up of the movie Ghostbusters, with the ghost in the logo exchanged for radical former UK-based Muslim cleric Abu Hamza.

Boby has additionally provided advice abroad to Australian anti-mosque activists such as the Q Society of Australia and to the Bendigo mosque protesters. He has also spoken to activists in Canada, and been interviewed by Erick Stakelbeck on CBN News in the United States.

== Other activities ==
In an initiative called "Never Shall Be Slaves", Boby also offers pro bono legal support for victims of British-Pakistani child exploitation gangs. On his YouTube channel, he has called for "mass repatriations" of immigrants from the UK.

He has been considered a part of the counter-jihad movement, and was a speaker at the 2012 counter-jihad conference in Brussels, Belgium. He has also spoken at a Pegida rally in Dresden, Germany, and to For Frihed (formerly Pegida Denmark).
