= Soldiers of Odin =

Anti-immigrant, white supremacist group

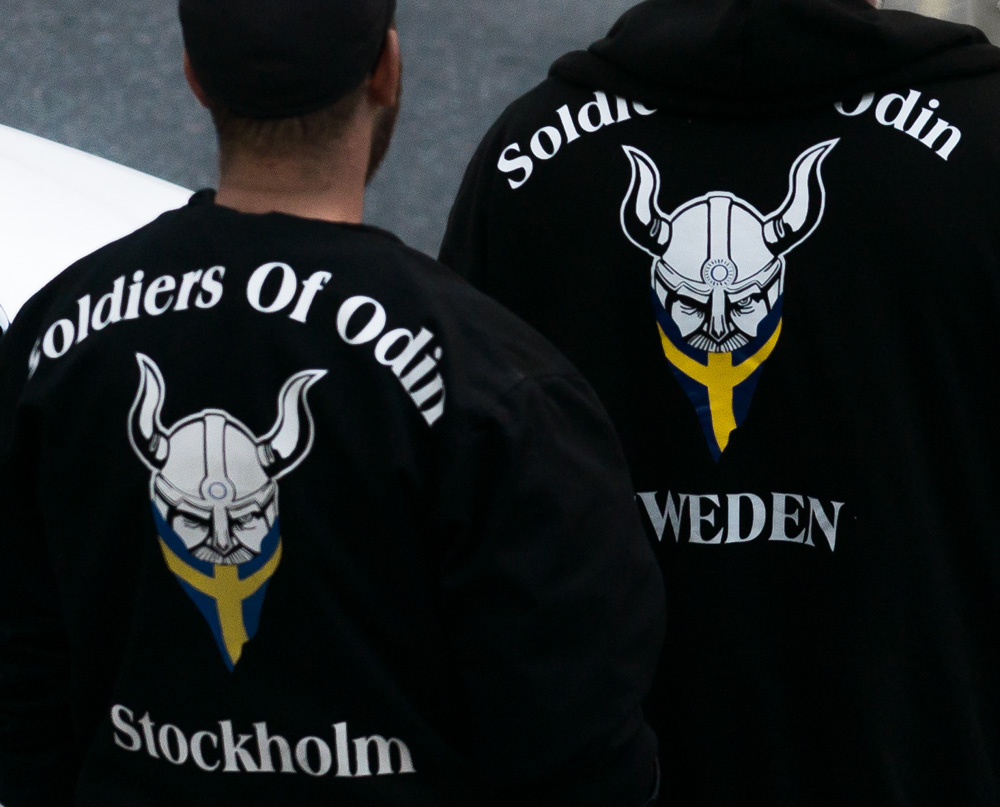
- People wearing shirts with Soldiers of Odin logo
- Formation: October 2015
- Founder: Mika Ranta
- Founded at: Kemi, Finland
- Purpose: Anti-immigrant activism Anti-Islam; Far-right activism Nordicism; Vigilantism; Neo-Nazism (factions)

Soldiers of Odin (SOO; Finnish: Odinin sotilaat) is an anti-immigrant group which was founded in Kemi, Finland, in October 2015. The group was established in response to the thousands of migrants who were arriving in Finland amidst the European migrant crisis. They call themselves a "patriotic organisation that fights for a Finland" that wants to scare away "Islamist intruders" they say cause insecurity and increase crime.

In interviews as well as on the group's public Facebook page, SOO has denied claims that the group is racist or promoting neo-Nazism. However, the group's founder, Mika Ranta, has connections to the far-right and neo-Nazi Nordic Resistance Movement as well as a criminal conviction which stems from a racially motivated assault which he committed in 2005. According to the Finnish public broadcaster Yle, a private Facebook page for selected members of SOO shows that racism and Nazi sympathies are rampant among higher-ranking members. The group's nature has raised concerns about anti-immigrant vigilantism.

Though the group denies the claim, Soldiers of Odin have been recognised by both the Southern Poverty Law Center and the Anti-Defamation League as a hate group. An ADL report states that their apparent purpose is "to conduct vigilante patrols" to protect citizens from "alleged depredations of refugees", and that "though not all such adherents of the group are white supremacists or bigots, so many of them clearly are that the Soldiers of Odin can easily be considered a hate group."

In addition to Finland, affiliates of the group have a presence in Australia, Belgium, Canada, Germany, the Netherlands, Denmark, Norway, Sweden, Estonia, the United States, the United Kingdom, Portugal and Spain.

== History ==
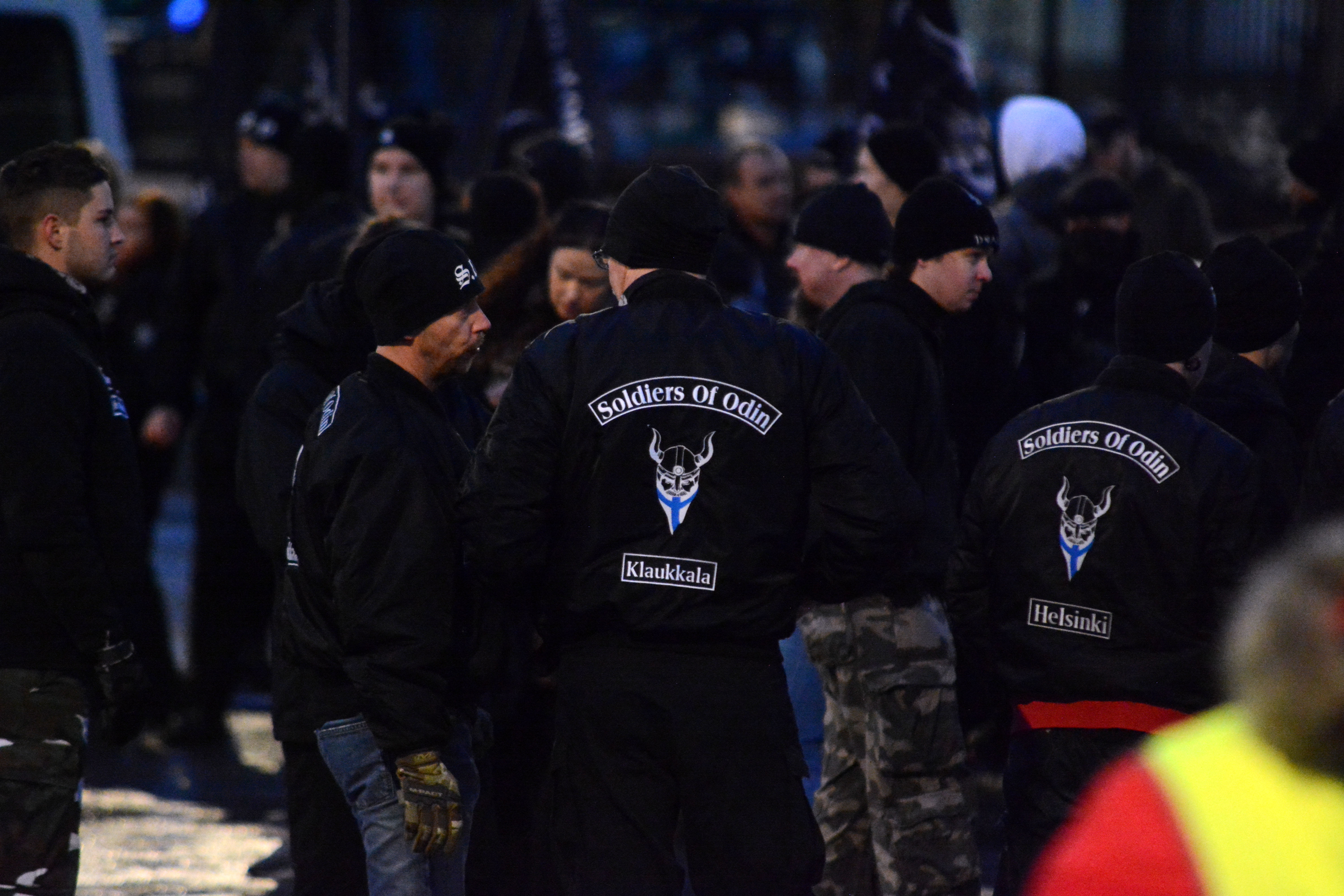
Soldiers of Odin in Finland

Mika Ranta, who, while a self-declared neo-Nazi and member of the Finnish Resistance Movement, maintains that his personal views do not represent the group as a whole. The group is named after Odin, the god that rules Asgard, home of the gods, in Norse mythology.

Soldiers of Odin gained momentum in 2016 after incidents such as the New Year's Eve sexual assaults in Germany, the January 2016 stabbing death of Alexandra Mezher, a Lebanese social worker in Sweden, and other migrant-related crime incidents. On 15 March 2016, Soldiers of Odin announced on their Facebook page that they had intervened in the attempted sexual harassment of two underage girls. The group also claimed that the perpetrators were two refugees and that the police thanked Soldiers of Odin for their actions. Further investigation revealed that neither the police nor any bystanders had any knowledge of the event. On 16 March 2016, Soldiers of Odin admitted that one of their members fabricated the story. The group apologized for the announcement and said that the member would be expelled.

The group's number of Facebook likes in Finland alone was more than 49,000 in December 2017.

According to Yle, Soldiers of Odin has connections to the Finnish MV-media alternative media website and has been promised good visibility on the site. MV-media website and its owner Ilja Janitskin have ties to the Russian-backed Donetsk People's Republic.

According to IL and Meduza, Yan Petrovsky, Russian nationalist accused of war crimes in Ukraine, was also an active Odin member. He was deported from Norway but arrested in Finland due to charges.

== Presence outside Finland ==
Soldiers of Odin claims a membership of 600 in Finland. The group also has a presence in Sweden and Norway; however, the Norwegian prime minister condemns the group. The group has a presence in Estonia even though Estonia "has almost no asylum seekers or refugees". Additionally, Soldiers of Odin has a following in the United States, Canada (British Columbia, Alberta, Ontario, Québec and New Brunswick), England, Belgium, Portugal and Germany.

=== Australia ===
Soldiers of Odin Australia arose out of the Reclaim Australia group. It was registered as a non-profit association with the Victorian government in June 2016. Their recruitment rhetoric included exaggerating illegal entry to the country, crime perpetrated by immigrants and the threat of Islamic terrorism, targeting mainly Anglo-Australian men. They also used the "exotic Norse mythology" to attract far-right sympathisers who were willing to take public action.

During the African gangs moral panic of 2016, the group ran "safety patrols" of Federation Square, Birrarung Marr and Bourke Street Mall, and outside city train stations at night in Melbourne, Victoria to counteract what it claims was the inability of police to protect the public from rising street crime and gangs such as the supposed Apex gang.

While they attracted significant press coverage in the second half of 2016, their presence seemed to have faded fairly quickly, and by 2020 they were no longer deemed a significant far-right group in Australia.

=== Canada ===
Cody Sutherland-Jantti of Ontario is one of Canada's founding members.

The Quebec chapter of Soldiers of Odin was established by Dave Tregget, who left to found the anti-immigration group Storm Alliance in 2016.

Soldiers of Odin established a group in Yukon, Canada, in 2016.

Soldiers of Odin were seen patrolling the streets of Edmonton, Alberta, Canada, in July 2016. The group told the police that they were not "anti-immigration", and the police confirmed the group had not engaged in any criminal activity as of September 2016. The Edmonton police did say that "If they are the Soldiers of Odin like they are in Europe, we are going to be very concerned".

A soldiers of Odin group began patrols in Grande Prairie, Alberta, where they not only patrol but are involved in helping the community in a variety of ways, including sending children to summer camps and helping to restore a vandalized war monument. The Grande Prairie chapter's Facebook describes them as "Soldiers of Odin is a charitable non-profit organization in Grand Prairie Alberta, with an eye on the community and helping hands for those in need". In 2019, the group was banned from holding events at the city's chapter of the Royal Canadian Legion, after a directive was issued by the national command.

A Soldiers of Odin group began patrols in Vancouver, British Columbia, Canada, in September 2016 but claimed to be independent and not affiliated with racist and biker groups.

A chapter also appeared in Winnipeg, Manitoba, in fall 2016, though they also claimed to be unaffiliated with the European groups. The national chapter is based in Gimli, Manitoba. An educator at MacEwan University counters their claims of non-hate stating "Why name yourself after that group, then, if you don't want to be associated with that ideology? If you truly are interested in community safety, community patrols, there's more than enough volunteer organizations that could have been joined."

A chapter of the Soldiers of Odin formed in Sudbury, Ontario, in summer 2016, around the same time that the leader of the Finnish Soldiers of Odin was sentenced for aggravated assault. Members soon began volunteering at a local soup kitchen and cleaning up discarded needles in public parks and trails and posting photos of their efforts on social media in an attempt to recruit new members. Following public outcry, they were banned from the soup kitchen for intimidating First Nations and Muslim members of the community trying to access the soup, they were banned from the soup kitchen. In August 2017, Soldiers of Odin were serving hamburgers at a dedication ceremony for organ donors when Chief Paul Pedersen of the City of Greater Sudbury Police Service posed for a photo with them. Popular backlash against the chief associating with the SOO resulted in a swift apology from the chief in which he said, "This photo should in no way be interpreted as support for this group."

A chapter appeared in Sault Ste. Marie in September 2016. A spokesperson for the group said the 11 members would conduct drug needle collection patrols in the city and provide security to a social worker whose work took them into risky areas after dark.

On 26 March 2017, Soldiers of Odin members clashed with protesters and police at an anti-racism rally in Vancouver, British Columbia. Several were led away in handcuffs after fights broke out. Joel Angott, the former president of Soldiers of Odin Canada, has said that his group supports "sustainable immigration". Members of the group participated in the 2022 convoy protest, including Jason LaFace, an organizer for the convoy in Ontario. LaFace, who has since claimed to be National President of Soldiers of Odin Canada, had previously publicly shared anti-immigrant sentiments and made statements against the Black Lives Matter movement and the LGBT community.

The Northern Guard that came up in 2017 are also an offshoot of the Soldiers of Odin according to the Canadian Anti-Hate Network.

=== Norway ===
The group began patrolling in Norway in February 2016, which was profiled temporarily in the start-up phase by Ronny Alte, a former leader of the Norwegian Defence League and Pegida activist. Among the 14 members several are known members of the extreme far-right and have criminal records. They were opposed by Osebergskipets venner who turned up dressed as Vikings as a protest against the misuse of traditional symbols.

=== Sweden ===
The group in Sweden have many members who are Neo-Nazis and are convicted of serious crimes. Several are sentenced for assaulting women. The Swedish chapter is headed by Mikael Johansson earlier a member of Nationaldemokraterna. The group began patrols in Sweden in March 2016, marching in several cities and towns, however they met with opposition groups and in Gothenburg they themselves had to ask the police for protection of their patrols.

== Reception ==
The Finnish National Police Commissioner, Seppo Kolehmainen, caused confusion when he initially welcomed the establishment of street patrols. In response, the Minister of the Interior, Petteri Orpo, said, "In Finland it is officials who oversee and take care of order in society. It is a simple matter and we will stick to it." Finnish Security Intelligence Service regards the group as unsettling.

Norwegian police initially expressed mixed reactions to the group, with some departments announcing that they would send marching members away, while others said the group was unproblematic. It caused some controversy when Progress Party MP and spokesperson for justice Jan Arild Ellingsen applauded the establishment of the group, saying they should be "praised". Government and party leaders quickly distanced themselves from his comments, stating public security to be the responsibility of the police.

The Estonian Prime Minister, Taavi Rõivas, criticized the group saying, "In the Republic of Estonia law and order is enforced by the Estonian police. Self-proclaimed gangs do not increase the Estonian people's sense of security in any way; rather the opposite."

== Trademark ==
In spring 2016, the Finnish Patent and Registration Office accepted a request to register "Soldiers of Odin" as a trademark for clothes, footwear and headgear. The owner of the trademark, however, has no connection to the vigilante street patrol group, and is using her brand as a statement against racism and to bring the authorities' decision to accept Soldiers of Odin as a registered organization into question.
