= Andy Fleming (activist) =

Australian journalist

- Occupations: Blogger; Academic
- Website: slackbastard.anarchobase.com

Andy Fleming, also known as Slackbastard, is the pseudonym of an Australian anarcho-communist journalist, academic, and activist, known for his study of far-right parties and movements in Australia. Fleming has also been involved with a radio program on 3CR, a community radio station in Melbourne, Australia.

Fleming's blog Slackbastard has reportedly received 7.5 million views since its foundation in 2005. He has studied nationalist groups such as the United Patriots Front and Reclaim Australia.

As of 2014, Fleming remains anonymous despite attempts to identity him.

== See also ==
- Anarchism in Australia

== Bibliography ==
- Rydgren, J., Fleming, A., & Mondon, A. (2018). The Radical Right in Australia. In The Oxford Handbook of the Radical Right. ISBN 9780190274559
