= Blair Cottrell =

Australian neo-Nazi (born 1989)

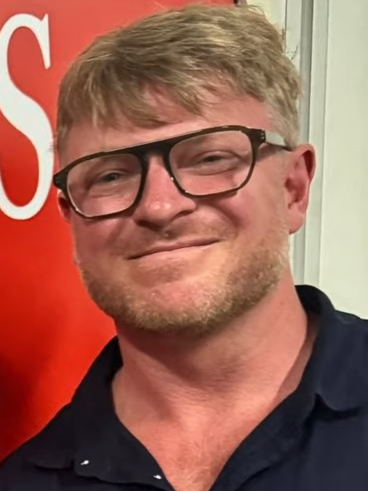
- Cottrell in 2025
- Born: 11 November 1989 (age 36); Australia
- Known for: Founding United Patriots Front, far-right activism, neo-Nazism
- Other political affiliations: Lads Society

Blair Cottrell (born 11 November 1989) is an Australian far-right activist and neo-Nazi. He was a founding member of the United Patriots Front (UPF) and the Lads Society. He has been convicted and served prison time for stalking, arson, illegal sales of steroids, and burglary.

== Political activities ==
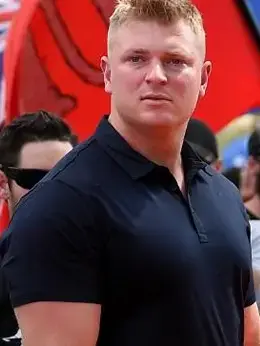
Blair Cottrell at a protest in 2016

In October 2015, Blair Cottrell replaced Shermon Burgess as chairman of the United Patriots Front, and is a founding member of the Lads Society.

In September 2016, Cottrell was a guest on the ABC Hack Live show.

In September 2017, Cottrell, Neil Erikson, and Chris Shortis were found guilty by a magistrate of inciting contempt against Muslims after they had enacted and made a video of a fake beheading, to protest against the building of a mosque in Bendigo. Each was fined $2,000. Cottrell lodged an appeal, applying for his case to be heard in the High Court of Australia and arguing that he had been charged under an "invalid law". This was thrown out in February 2019, and he tried to have the matter heard in the Supreme Court of Victoria. The district court judge ruled that there were matters to be decided in her court, such as his intentions in making the video, before the case could proceed to a higher court, and set a date for the appeal to be heard in the county court. The county court dismissed Cottrell's appeal in December 2019. The judge also said: "even if the ends were political, the means remain vilifying. Having a political end is not a defence to the charge."

In January 2018, Channel 7 broadcast a report detailing the United Patriots Front's meeting with far-right vigilante group True Blue Crew where they discussed how to deal with the supposed "African gang problem" in Melbourne. The broadcaster then showed a one-on-one interview with Cottrell.

=== Christchurch mosque shooter connections ===
In the aftermath of the Christchurch mosque shootings at Al Noor Mosque and Linwood Islamic Centre in Christchurch, New Zealand on 15 March 2019, it was discovered that the perpetrator, Brenton Harrison Tarrant of Grafton, New South Wales, Australia, had interacted with Cottrell's United Patriots Front (UPF) on its Facebook pages. He affectionately called Blair Cottrell "Emperor Blair Cottrell" as well as donating to the UPF and threatening a man from Melbourne, Victoria, Australia over criticism of the organisation in 2016. Cottrell had distanced himself from Tarrant and denounced his attacks, stating he didn't know him. He conceded it was possible that a UPF member did meet him at one point. Tarrant was also offered to join the Lads Society but declined.

=== Sky News appearance ===
In August 2018, News Corp news outlet Sky News Australia was criticised for providing a platform to Cottrell in a one-on-one discussion about immigration. Sky News reporter Laura Jayes took offence at his appearance on the program due to the fact that he has expressed admiration for Hitler and claimed to have manipulated women "using violence and terror". Political editor of Sky News David Speers was also critical of Cottrell's appearance on the show. Sky News commentator and former Labor Party minister Craig Emerson resigned in protest after the interview was broadcast, saying that the decision to give Cottrell a platform on Sky was "another step in a journey to normalising racism & bigotry in our country". Cottrell subsequently tweeted about Jayes: "I might as well have raped @ljayes on the air, not only would she have been happier with that but the reaction would've been the same." Activist groups called on advertisers to pull advertising campaigns off Sky News.

== Criminal activities ==
In 2012, Cottrell served four months in Port Phillip Prison after being convicted of stalking his ex-girlfriend and her new partner, and of arson after attempting to burn down the man's house. In December 2013, he was fined $1,000 and sentenced to seven days in jail by a County Court judge for aggravated burglary, property damage, arson, testosterone trafficking, possessing a controlled weapon and breaching court orders.

== Political views ==
Cottrell's right-wing views have been described by numerous media outlets and Australia's former Race Discrimination Commissioner, Tim Soutphommasane, as neo-Nazi. He has been convicted of charges of inciting hatred against Muslim communities.

In 2015, Cottrell stated on Facebook a desire to see a portrait of Adolf Hitler hung in Australian classrooms and for copies of Mein Kampf to be "issued annually" to students, and has made anti-Semitic and racist comments in support of Nazism.

In 2018, Cottrell openly advocated for remigration, calling for the deportation of "enemies of my country" and the execution of immigrants who refused to leave.

During the COVID-19 pandemic Cottrell spread anti-vaccine misinformation.

== See also ==
- Antisemitism in Australia
- Far-right politics in Australia
- Islamophobia in Australia
- National Socialist Party of Australia, defunct Australian neo-Nazi political party
- Senator Fraser Anning, who interacted with Cottrell, attending a January 2019 rally organised by him
- Reclaim Australia, related far-right Australian group, predecessor to the United Patriots Front
