= Kirralie Smith =

Australian anti-trans campaigner

Kirralie Smith is an Australian anti-trans, anti-halal, and anti-gay marriage activist.

== Politics ==
=== Q Society ===
Smith is a member of Q Society. In 2017, the society publicly apologized to a halal certifier as part of a settlement to defamation lawsuit stemming from videos starring Smith. At a Q Society fundraiser, Smith said that she was anti-Islam but not anti-Muslims.

=== Australian Liberty Alliance, Australian Conservatives ===
On 7 April 2017, Smith, a former candidate for the Australian Liberty Alliance and Senate candidate for New South Wales in 2016, joined the Australian Conservatives.

=== Marriage Alliance, Binary Australia ===
Smith was a leading figure in the Marriage Alliance group that campaigned against same-sex marriage in Australia. After same-sex marriage was legalized, the organization rebranded as Binary Australia to oppose intersex and transgender rights. In 2025, a court granted an apprehended violence order against Smith originating from tweets targeting a trans football player. The court found Smith's tweets to be "highly intimidatory". Later in 2025, Smith was found guilty of vilifying two trans football players, including the player protected by the earlier apprehended violence order, and was ordered to pay a fine and issue a public apology. She appealed the case in the Supreme Court of New South Wales the next year, and lost.
