= Islamophobia in Australia =

Islamophobia is distrust and hostility against Muslims and those perceived as following the religion, and occurs in Australia. It is often facilitated and perpetuated in the media through the stereotyping of Muslims as violent and uncivilised. Various Australian politicians and political commentators have capitalised on these negative stereotypes and this has contributed to the marginalisation, discrimination, and exclusion of the Muslim community.

Although the interior of the continent had been opened up largely through the assistance of "Afghan" cameleers, many of whom were Muslim, Muslim immigration to Australia was restricted under the White Australia policy, in existence from 1901 to 1975.

== Background ==
Muslims have a long history in Australia, from Makassan trepang traders from Sulawesi from at least the 18th century or earlier. The interior of the continent was opened up for telegraph and then railway communications largely through the assistance of "Afghan" cameleers from the 1860s.

== Definition and theories ==
Islamophobia may be described as distrust and hostility towards Muslims, Islam, and those perceived as following the religion. This social aversion and bias is often facilitated and perpetuated in the media through the stereotyping of Muslims as violent and uncivilised. Various Australian politicians and political commentators have capitalised on these negative stereotypes and this has contributed to the marginalisation, discrimination and exclusion of the Muslim community.

Anti-Muslim prejudices are thought to be sourced from a perceived lack of integration among Muslim migrants, and reconfiguration of community and ethnic politics. Muslims have sometimes been reduced to caricatures of misogynists and oppressed women; violent men were thought as inclined to terrorism. The Australian media is noted for presenting portrayals of Muslim immigrants in a negative manner, although in comparison to other Western countries, Australian media exhibits less bias as a result of its coverage of the everyday life of Australian Muslims.

According to some scholars, public discourse rectifying negative images of Islamic culture result in an unfounded fear of actual Muslims; public discourse focusing on the Western values of women's rights enabled Islam and Islamic clerics to be portrayed as misogynist and oppressive towards women.

Some theorists maintain that, increasingly since 11 September 2001, the Australian public has attributed Australian Muslims with a sense of "otherness", using social constructions and generic misrepresentations of Muslims as a way to regain existential control in a post-9/11 world. Some scholars have argued that the rise of militant Islam in Australia has led to the increase in Islamophobia and undone efforts by Muslims to foster positive relations with the Australian public.

== Incidence ==
=== General prevalence ===
Estimates of the prevalence of anti-Muslim sentiment in Australia differ. A large-scale poll published in 2011 found that 48.6 per cent of Australians had a negative opinion of Islam. Another survey published in 2014 found that a quarter of Australians held anti-Muslim views; this incidence was five times higher than that for any other religion. The latter survey also found that 27 per cent of Muslim Australians have experienced discrimination, which was also the highest of any of the religions covered in the study. A poll conducted by the University of South Australia's International Centre for Muslim and non-Muslim Understanding released in 2016 found that 10 per cent of Australians have hostile attitudes towards Muslims. Older people, those who had not completed year 12 and people outside the workforce were more likely to report anti-Muslim attitudes in this poll. The accompanying report concluded that the poll shows that "most Australians display low levels of Islamophobia".

A 2015 report from Australia found that the levels of Islamophobia among Buddhists and Hindus were significantly higher than among followers of other religions.

Certain incidents have led to incidents of Islamophobic incidents. Since Hamas attacked Israel on 7 October 2023, threats towards Muslims, which formerly averaged around 2.5 cases a week before, increased by 636% by March 2026. The ensuing Gaza war also led to greater antisemitism in Australia. The massacre of Australian Jews at Bondi Beach in December 2025 led to increased fear and hate of Muslims, with reported incidents up by 201% by March 2026 - when there were around 18 cases a week.

=== In politics ===
Senator Pauline Hanson, leader of One Nation party, is known for her frequent criticisms of Islam and Muslims.

In the 2019 Australian federal election, ten parties were listed by the "My vote matters" campaign, an initiative of the Islamic Council of Victoria, as openly Islamophobic, with a number of minor parties including such policies as well. Fraser Anning's Conservative National Party was included in the list. The issue only arose briefly as an election issue when two Liberal candidates were disendorsed after their views previously expressed on social media were publicised.

The Albanese government appointed a Special Envoy to Combat Islamophobia, Aftab Malik, in September 2024. However, many leaders in Muslim communities say that not enough is being done, with politicians such as Hanson dog-whistling racists, along with uncontrolled hate speech on social media.

In November 2025, Hanson wore a burqa in the Australian Parliament, in a stunt designed to bring a motion to "ban the burqa", and was suspended for a week. In March 2026, she was censured by the Senate after suggesting that there were no "good" Muslims.

Australian Liberty Alliance and Rise Up Australia Party were Anti-Islam parties during the 2010s.

== Incidents ==
=== First Gulf War (1990s) ===
During the First Gulf War, there were a number of racist attacks, in some cases including violence against Arabs and Muslims, including property damage; Arab-owned shops were looted and vandalised and Islamic institutions received bomb threats. People with the surname "Hussein" received harassment calls. The Muslim community also dealt with stigmatisation as a result of ASIO's anti-terror efforts. The Australian media had reported that based on ASIO intelligence, New South Wales would be the target of a terrorist attack. In a counterterrorism effort, a number of Arabs and Muslims, including a number of political activists, were visited by ASIO personnel; ASIO also conducted a number of wiretaps on Arab and Muslim Australians. No such attack did occur, although the Jewish community experienced a number of racist attacks. Initially, Muslims were blamed for the attacks on the Jewish institutions. However, the New South Wales Anti-Discrimination Board concluded that there was insufficient evidence that Muslims were behind the attack.

=== Opposition to Halal certification (2014) ===
In 2014, anti-Islam groups campaigned against Australian food companies in an attempt to stop them having their food certified as being halal. The groups argued that the cost of certification increases the prices of food to all consumers, and that the fees charged for certification were used to fund terrorism. In November 2014 Fleurieu Milk & Yoghurt Company stopped producing halal products after being targeted by campaigners, and a number of other large and small companies were also reported to have been targeted. Keysar Trad from the Australian Federation of Islamic Councils told a journalist in July 2014 that these groups were attempting to exploit anti-Muslim sentiments.

In 2015 the far-right and anti-Islam Q Society was involved in a defamation lawsuit over its claims that the Islamic certification industry is corrupt and funds "the push for sharia law in Australia". Legal proceedings against senior members of the Melbourne-based Q Society and Kirralie Smith, who runs the website HalalChoices, began after a speech was given at a Q Society event that portrayed El-Mouelhy as "part of a conspiracy to destroy Western civilisation from within" and "reasonably suspected of providing financial support to terrorist organisations". El-Mouelhy says that he has been defamed in relation to the proceeds of halal certification. This case has now been settled out of court.

In response to the comments made by Smith and HalalChoices, officials from the Australian Criminal Intelligence Commission have stated that the commission has been on "heightened lookout" for links between halal certifiers and terrorism since the issue surfaced but has "not found any direct linkages". Furthermore, a Senate inquiry into food certification asserted that there was "no link" between the religious approval process and extremist groups. It recommended that the federal government increase its oversight of domestic halal certifiers to address fraudulent conduct in the sector. It said that it had heard, "credible reports suggesting that the lack of regulation has been unscrupulously exploited". In tabling the report, committee chairman Sam Dastyari said, "Some certifiers are nothing more than scammers." The committee recommended a single halal certification authority. The committee in recommending clearer labelling, specifically referred to the need for meat processors to label products sourced from animals subject to religious slaughter.

As of 27 February 2017, as part of a settlement agreement, Smith and the Q Society have publicly apologised and agreed to display notice of the settlement on their respective websites for one year. The case was settled out of court.

=== Bendigo mosque protests (2014–15) ===
In 2014 the City of Greater Bendigo announced the construction of a A$3m mosque and Islamic community centre in Bendigo, Victoria. Some residents created a "Stop the Mosque in Bendigo" group and certain far-right organisations, in particular the Q Society, mobilised residents and brought in outsiders to oppose the construction by conducting extensive protests. The society organised a meeting on 11 May 2014 with residents opposed to the building of the mosque to provide advice on protesting and also distributed pamphlets containing anti-Islam hate speech at the council meeting which voted to go ahead with the project. The Bendigo and Adelaide Bank openly supported the building and funding of a mosque and closed the account of the Stop the Mosque group, saying that the group did not share its values.

In October 2015, around 1,000 people turned up for a protest organised by the United Patriots Front (UPF), many having travelled from far afield. Members of the extremist group Right Wing Resistance Australia travelled from interstate, and the Rise Up Australia Party was also represented. There was also a counter-demonstration to that of the far-right groups. Over 420 mounted police, riot squad and other police officers were assigned to oversee the rallies, and two arrests were made for carrying knives, one for carrying a flare and another for minor assault.

=== Rallies and violent confrontations (2015) ===
Anti-Islam Reclaim Australia rallies have been held across Australia since 2015. Reclaim Australia is a far-right nationalist protest group which is associated with neo-Nazi and other nationalist hate groups. The group was formed in 2015, holding street rallies in cities across Australia to protest against Islam.

Reclaim Australia primarily opposes Islam in Australia and is considered Islamophobic. The group has attracted neo-Nazis and their involvement in promoting and attending Reclaim Australia rallies has been well documented. Speakers at Reclaim Australia rallies have been known to express extremist views, with one speaker in South Australia warning of the risks of "Islamic barbarity" and encouraging those in attendance to "insult and vilify Islam five times a day if you want to".

=== Serious contempt (2015) ===
In June 2015, the United Patriots Front, a far-right Australian nationalist protest group which is associated with nationalist and neo-Nazi hate groups, protested Zaky Mallah's appearance on Q&A, a television programme, by roasting a pig outside the Melbourne office of the Australian Broadcasting Corporation building, in an apparent attempt to offend Muslims.

In October of the same year, the group beheaded a mannequin outside the Bendigo City Council chambers to protest the 2015 Parramatta shooting and the approval given by the council to construct a mosque in Bendigo. In September 2017, they were convicted of "inciting serious contempt of Muslims" under the Racial and Religious Tolerance Act 2001 (Vic), and each were fined $2,000 Appeals by Blair Cottrell to have his case heard in the High Court of Australia and the Supreme Court of Victoria were both thrown out in 2019.

=== Australia Day billboard removal (2016) ===
In 2016, a billboard promoting Australia Day celebrations in the Melbourne suburb of Cranbourne was removed after threats and abuse were directed at the advertising company. The billboard featured two Muslim girls in hijabs waving Australian flags and celebrating Australia Day.

=== Q Society Dinner (2017) ===
Islamophobia was documented at a Q Society fundraising dinner, with numerous guest speakers, including current members of the Australian Government, present. Speaker Larry Pickering stating that "If they (Muslims) are in the same street as me, I start shaking", and that "They are not all bad, they do chuck pillow-biters off buildings." adding that "I can't stand Muslims". The cartoonist also auctioned an overtly Islamophobic work depicting the rape of a woman in a niqab by her son-in-law. Another Larry Pickering cartoon auctioned at the fundraiser depicted an Imam as a pig (in Islam the consumption of all pork products is considered haram or forbidden), being spit roasted, with a "halal certified" stamp on its rump. A case of wine called "72 Virgins" was also up for grabs, along with a signed photograph of Dame Joan Sutherland. Kirralie Smith denied supporting Pickering's statements; however, she reiterated parts of the speech, stating that "there are Muslims that actually do throw gays off buildings!". Sitting members of the Australian Government, Cory Bernardi and George Christensen, attracted criticism for speaking at the Q Society of Australia. The event received protests who called the event racist.

=== Christchurch mosque shootings (2019) ===
On 15 March 2019, 51 people were killed in shooting attacks that targeted two mosques in Christchurch, New Zealand, during Jumu'ah. The perpetrator was identified as Brenton Tarrant, a 28-year-old who was born in Australia and lived in Grafton, New South Wales. Tarrant was regarded as a white nationalist and a neo-fascist who sought to foster an "atmosphere of fear" within the Muslim community.

Independent Queensland senator Fraser Anning released a statement shortly after the attacks. While Anning condemned the shooting, he identified the cause as "the immigration program which allowed Muslim fanatics to migrate to New Zealand in the first place" and stated that the event reflects increasing Islamophobia in Australia and New Zealand. Anning's comments were roundly criticised by other Australian politicians and left-wing media.

=== Impact of the War in Gaza (2023–present) ===
Between October and December 2023, Australia experienced a surge in both Islamophobia and anti-Semitism following the outbreak of hostilities between Israel and Hamas on 7 October. The Islamophobia Register Australia recorded 133 Islamophobic incidents between 7 October and 6 November 2023, including spitting attacks, threats to mosques and Muslim schools, graffiti, property damage, hate mail, verbal abuse, and online abuse. By comparison, the average number of weekly Islamophobic incidents prior to 7 October averaged 2.5 per week. Executive director of Islamophobia Register Australia, Sharara Attai, said that she believed that the number of Islamophobic incidents was higher than 133 and that Islamophobia and other hate crimes were often under-reported. In addition, the Victorian Police recorded 12 Islamophobic incidents between 7 October and 9 November, resulting in one arrest.

By 2 December, the number of Islamophobic incidents recorded by the Islamophobia Register had risen by 13-fold to 230 incidents over a period of seven weeks. Notable incidents included a young Christian boy being called a "terrorist" for his Palestinian ethnicity, Muslim women having their hijabs yanked off, and Arab and Muslim Australians being doxed, receiving death threats, and dismissed from their jobs for expressing pro-Palestinian viewpoints or attending pro-Palestine rallies.

Aftab Malik, the Special Envoy to Combat Islamophobia appointed by the Albanese government in September 2024, released his report on a national framework to combat Islamophobia in mid-September 2025. Malik's report made 54 recommendations including reviewing anti-discrimination laws, including the Racial Discrimination Act 1975, improving data collection on hate crimes, developing behavioural codes of conduct for Members of Parliament and parliamentary staff, and introducing compulsory Islamophobia courses for MPs and parliamentary staff. The Albanese government appointed an anti-Semitism envoy as well, due to an escalation of both anti-Muslim and anti-Semitic incidents following the outbreak of the Gaza war.

== Responses ==
In 2014, filmmaker Kamal Saleh orchestrated a social experiment to test how Australians would react if they witnessed a Muslim person being abused. In one scene a woman in a hijab is being harassed by a young man; in another it is a young boy who is the target of the discriminatory abuse. Saleh's film showed non-Muslim Australians standing up to the abuse and defending the Muslim victim.

Following the 2014 Martin Place siege, when an Iranian-Australian gunman took 17 hostages resulting in his death and the deaths of two hostages, a social media campaign in support of Australian Muslims was launched using the hashtag "#illridewithyou" to assist Muslims who may feel intimidated to use public transportation.

In 2015, academic researcher Susie Latham and professor Linda Briskman created the "Voices against Bigotry" website and network, which aim to raise an opposing voice against Islamophobia by encouraging ordinary people and community leaders, particularly politicians, to speak out on the issue. The network has active members across Australia who write articles for the media and academic journals and make public comment. The website acts as a clearing house for alleged anti-Muslim bigotry, advertising events and centralising research and information.

=== Legislation ===
Discriminatory acts against Muslims is prohibited under Australian law, both on a state and federal level. Some acts of legislation include:

- Anti-Discrimination Act 1991 (Qld)
- Anti-Discrimination Act 1977 (NSW)
- Australian Human Rights Commission Act 1986
- Disability Discrimination Act 1992
- Racial and Religious Tolerance Act 2001 (Victoria)
- Racial Discrimination Act 1975
- Sex Discrimination Act 1984

Critics maintain that legislation concerning Islamophobia has been too restrictive in its development, and that the state's response to discriminatory practices against Arabs and Muslims has been too slow.

Protesters have been critical of discrimination in the workforce by Muslims in circumstances that relate to religious based employment positions. However all states provide for exceptions to their respective laws regarding discrimination where it occurs for religious purposes.

=== Council for the Prevention of Islamophobia ===
A Council for the Prevention of Islamophobia Inc has been established by the Islamic Research and Educational Academy

The council's intolerance of their critics was on display when an Australian speaking tour of Ayaan Hirsi Ali was organised for April 2017. As a former Muslim, she is considered an "apostate" by Muslims and faces the death penalty in her country of origin. The council told organisers that there would be 5,000 protesters outside the Festival Hall in Melbourne if she was to speak at that venue. Their threats achieved their aim and her Australian tour was cancelled.

== Criticism of term and use ==
The term and its use, is criticised. Professor of Psychology, Nick Haslam from the University of Melbourne says the use of this type of word, "brushes aside opinions we dislike by invalidating the people who hold them ... and closes the door on dialogue".

Brian McNair, Professor of Journalism, Media and Communication at Queensland University of Technology writing in The Conversation in support of, "legitimate and increasingly necessary" open discussion about Islam says, "critiquing Islam [is not] Islamophobia [or] racism [nor is it] anti-Muslim."

== See also ==
- Anti-Arabism in Australia
- Criticism of Islam
- Far-right politics in Australia
- Far-right terrorism in Australia
- Islam in Australia
- Mariam Veiszadeh, founder of the Islamophobia Register
- Online Hate Prevention Institute
- Racism in Australia
- Racial violence in Australia
- Reclaim Australia (2015)
- Pauline Hanson's 2017 and 2025 burqa incidents
