= Danny Nalliah =

Australian pastor

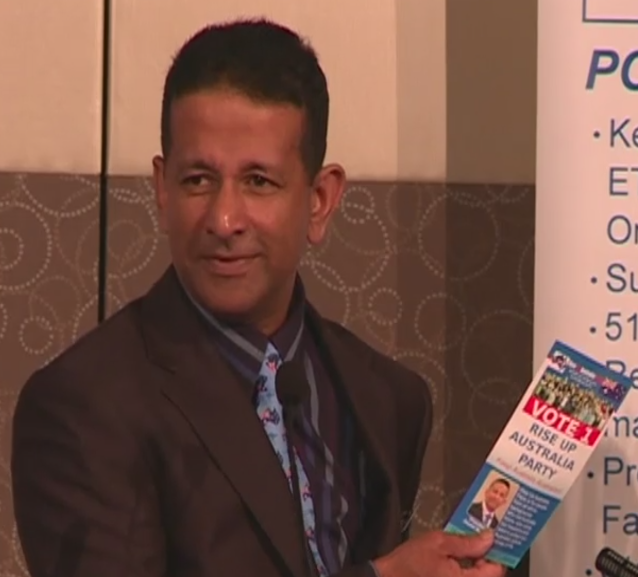

Personal details
- Born: Daniel Nalliah; 1964 (age 61–62) Colombo, Sri Lanka
- Denomination: Christian: independent Pentecostal, previously Australian Christian Churches
- Occupation: Pastor, political leader Rise Up Australia Party

Daniel "Danny" Nalliah (born 1964) is a Sri Lankan Australian evangelical Christian pastor. He was the leader of the now-dissolved Rise Up Australia political party and is the president of Catch the Fire Ministries. Nalliah defended against a lawsuit brought by the Islamic Council of Victoria under Victoria's Racial and Religious Tolerance Act. In this case, Judge Michael Higgins found in favour of the Islamic Council of Victoria, which took the action against Catch the Fire, but his decision was overturned by the Victorian Court of Appeal.

Nalliah used to be associated with the Australian Christian Churches.

== Early years ==
According to his biography published by the Catch the Fire Ministries, Daniel Nalliah was born in Sri Lanka to minority Sri Lankan Tamil parents who spoke English as their first language. However, he was schooled at the Nugegoda Tamil Mahavidyalaya in Colombo, where all teaching was in done in Tamil. He was introduced to the "ways of God" by an Australian missionary. In his youth, he played at a number of night clubs in Colombo as a drummer before turning to religion. He also worked as an underground missionary in Saudi Arabia before migrating to Australia in 1997.

After moving to Australia and founding Catch the Fire Ministries, Nalliah travelled extensively, preaching to congregations in a number of countries. He asserts that he witnessed the healing of blind, deaf and crippled people at his prayer sessions and also claims that a dead girl was resurrected after he prayed for her.

He is a young earth creationist.

== Vilification of Muslims lawsuit ==
On 9 March 2002, Daniel Scot spoke at a seminar regarding Islam, sponsored by Catch the Fire Ministries. The seminar was attended by three Australian Muslims; two of them were asked to attend by May Helou, an executive member of the Islamic Council of Victoria (ICV) and an employee of the Equal Opportunity Commission, Victoria. The third person was asked to attend by ICV members while he was at the ICV office. The three Muslims, along with the Islamic Council of Victoria, later launched action under the Racial and Religious Tolerance Act, claiming that the intent of the speech had been to vilify Muslims rather than to discuss Islam itself. After being considered by the Equal Opportunity Commission, the case was heard by the Victorian Civil and Administrative Tribunal (VCAT), becoming the first real test case under the act.

In a landmark ruling on 17 December 2004, the tribunal ruled that Nalliah, Scot and Catch the Fire Ministries had breached the law. Judge Higgins heard further submissions regarding "remedies" early in 2005. Nalliah publicly condemned the verdict and declared his intention to continue fighting the case, potentially as far as the High Court of Australia. The Age newspaper quoted him as stating, "We may have lost the battle, but the war is not over. The law has to be removed, there is no question."

On 22 June 2005, Judge Michael Higgins of the Victorian Civil and Administrative Tribunal delivered his final verdict on the religious vilification issue regarding remedies. He found that financial compensation would be inappropriate but ordered Nalliah and Scot to take out newspaper advertisements to the value of $68,690 that summarised the findings in the case. Nalliah criticised the ruling, comparing the legislation to "sharia law by stealth". He also said that he would rather go to jail than comply with the ruling. Lawyers for the defendants had previously appealed to the Supreme Court of Victoria, in an originating motion alleging that Higgins showed signs of bias, that there were errors in the decision and that the act itself was unconstitutional. Following the decision, an appeal was lodged with the Court of Appeal, and the originating motion was dropped. The appeal was heard in August 2006.

The Becket Fund for Religious Liberty, an interfaith public interest law firm based in Washington, D.C., had intervened on Scot's behalf, engaging in discussion with the Attorney General of Australia, providing legal representation with local counsel and providing legal arguments employed for the legal appeal. On 14 December 2006, the Court of Appeal of Victoria upheld the appeal and ordered that the matter be redecided without hearing new evidence by a judge (other than Judge Higgins) of the Victorian Civil and Administrative Tribunal. The Islamic Council of Victoria was ordered to pay half of Scot's and Nalliah's legal costs of the appeal.

The matter was eventually resolved without a VCAT hearing after mediation between the two parties. On 22 June 2007 VCAT published a statement agreed to by both parties which affirmed everyone's rights to "robustly debate religion including the right to criticise the religious belief of another, in a free, open and democratic society".

== Political activity ==
=== Family First party ===
In November 2004, Nalliah campaigned for a seat in the Australian Senate as a candidate of the Family First Party. He was slotted second on the party's Victorian Senate list but failed to be elected. Nevertheless, his candidacy caused considerable controversy when National Party Senate candidate Barnaby Joyce launched a heavily publicised attack on Family First and his own party's preference deal with them the day before the election. Joyce highlighted a quote from one of Nalliah's brochures that asked parishioners to pray that God would pull down "Satan's strongholds", which included brothels, gambling places, bottle shops, mosques and temples (including Freemason, Buddhist and Hindu temples). Joyce used Nalliah's derogatory statements about minority groups to describe Family First as "not the sort of people you do preference deals with."

In late October 2009, the Family First parliamentary leader, Senator Steve Fielding, noted that after the incident cited above Nalliah was asked to leave the party and did so. At the same time, Nalliah argued that the discovery of an adolescent "satanist" Black Mass site in Canberra's Mount Ainslie indicated that the federal parliament was "under attack" and referred to witchcraft, liberal abortion laws and legislation that supported LGBT rights in Australia as the "reason" behind an apparent spate of parliamentary marriage crises.

=== Rise Up Australia Party ===
On 22 June 2011, Nalliah launched a new political party, Rise Up Australia, which he leads. Stated aims of the party include the protection of freedom of speech, freedom of religion and preserving Australia's "Judeo-Christian heritage".

== Political views ==
=== Black Saturday bushfires ===
In the wake of the Black Saturday bushfires, in which 173 died, Nalliah claimed he had received "prophetic dreams" on 21 October 2008 that these bushfires were a "consequence" of Victoria's decriminalisation of abortion in 2008, prompting criticism from a former Australian Treasurer, Peter Costello, that Nalliah's assertion was "beyond the bounds of decency".

=== Holsworthy Barracks terror plot ===
Nalliah planned to use the Holsworthy Barracks terror plot as an argument to explain that Christianity should be protected "as the core value of the nation" in his speech titled "Is the West being de-Christianised?" delivered at the Australian Christian Nation Association Annual National Conference held on 21 November 2009 at the Assyrian Sport and Cultural Club, Fairfield Heights, Sydney.

=== Queensland floods in 2010-2011 ===
After the catastrophic 2010–11 Queensland floods, Nalliah declared on his website "at once I was reminded of Kevin Rudd speaking against Israel in Israel on 14 December 2010. It is very interesting that Kevin Rudd is from QLD. Is God trying to get our attention? Yes, I believe so."

=== Views on homosexuality ===
In a 2011 interview with Perth's Out in Perth, Nalliah stated that homosexuals can be turned back to heterosexual relationships through education and through Christ. "As a political party, while we love the homosexual community and want to get to know them better, we also have a stand where we say, children need to be protected. We would love to see every man and woman come together, there's a time in life when you do things, and maybe you feel yes you are locked into an agenda... [our position] is that homosexuality is not OK." He also said that "Children should not be exposed to [public displays of homosexual affection] and other practices that go beyond morality."

=== Views on multiculturalism ===
"We also know that Stalin and his communist ideologies were responsible for the murder of millions of people. Although communist ideologies seemed to be very good to many millions of people, the end result was much death and destruction. In other words, 'One Word' becomes a gate way to lead to great disaster if we don't wake up in time. We have seen Nazism and Communism destroy many nations.

"So we need to take a good look at the word 'Multiculturalism'. Although this word seems to sound so good, in reality it is currently destroying the Judeo-Christian West and replacing it with an 'Interfaith' deceptive agenda led by the United Nations. It is Communism wearing a new uniform. It is also worth noting that the first few letters of this word is "Multicult"-uralism."

== Books ==
- Danny Nalliah: Worship Under the Sword: Melbourne: D&M Publications: 1998: ISBN 0-646-35577-5

== See also ==
- Rise Up Australia Party
- List of political parties in Australia
