= Racial and Religious Tolerance Act 2001 =

Statute passed by the Victorian Parliament during the premiership of Steve Bracks

Parliament of Victoria
- Long title: An Act to promote racial and religious tolerance by prohibiting the vilification of persons on the ground of race or religious belief or activity, to amend the Equal Opportunity Act 1995 and for other purposes.
- Citation: No. 47 of 2001
- Royal assent: 27 June 2001
- Status: Repealed

The Racial and Religious Tolerance Act 2001 is an act of the Parliament of Victoria, Australia, that makes behaviour that incites or encourages hatred, serious contempt, revulsion or severe ridicule against another person or group of people, because of their race or religion, unlawful in Victoria. The act was passed during the premiership of Steve Bracks and went into effect on 1 January 2002. From 30 June 2026, the legislation was repealed and replaced by the Justice Legislation Amendment (Anti-vilification and Social Cohesion) Act 2025.

The act also prohibits racist graffiti, racist posters, racist stickers, racist comments made in a publication, including the Internet and email, statements at a meeting or at a public rally. The act explicitly applies to public behaviour – not personal beliefs.

== Provisions ==
Section 8(1) of the act provides:

A person must not, on the ground of the religious belief or activity of another person or class of persons, engage in conduct that incites hatred against, serious contempt for, or revulsion or severe ridicule of, that other person or class of persons.

Note: '"engage in conduct" includes use of the Internet or e-mail to publish or transmit statements or other material.

Section 11 of the act provides:

A person does not contravene section 7 or 8 if the person establishes that the person's conduct was engaged in reasonably and in good faith—

(a) in the performance, exhibition or distribution of an artistic work; or
(b) in the course of any statement, publication, discussion or debate made or held, or any other conduct engaged in, for—

(i) any genuine academic, artistic, religious or scientific purpose; or
(ii) any purpose that is in the public interest; or

(c) in making or publishing a fair and accurate report of any event or matter of public interest.

== Complaints ==
=== Satanism ===
In 2003, Olivia Watts charged the mayor of the City of Casey, Victoria, Rob Wilson, alleging violation of the Act after he issued a press release in June of that year titled "Satanic cult out to take over Casey", in which Watts was mentioned by name.

During a hearing on 12 August 2004, in the Victorian Civil and Administrative Tribunal, Watts said that after the press release, she suffered vandalism to her property and an assault at her home, in addition to general "hatred, contempt and revulsion".

On 13 August, it was revealed in tribunal that the matter had been settled overnight, and Wilson read a statement acknowledging that Watts was not a Satanist and expressing "regret for any hurt felt by Ms Watts in consequence of his press release".

=== Catch the Fire Ministries ===
In 2004, the Islamic Council of Victoria laid a complaint under the act alleging vilification of Muslims about the preaching by two Christian pastors. One was Daniel Scot, a man who had fled Pakistan when a charge of blasphemy was made against him there. The other was Danny Nalliah. Both made controversial remarks about Islam at a seminar held in Queensland in March 2002. It was alleged that Scot claimed that Muslims were terrorists who wanted to take over Australia, and that those who didn't weren't true Muslims.

On 17 December 2004, the Victorian Civil and Administrative Tribunal (VCAT) ruled that Nalliah, Scot and the Christian group Catch the Fire Ministries had vilified Muslims at the seminar, and in a newsletter and website article authored by the group. Nalliah publicly condemned the verdict declaring that "We may have lost the battle, but the war is not over. The law has to be removed, there is no question."

On 22 June 2005, VCAT Judge Michael Higgins ordered Nalliah and Scot to make a public apology for vilifying Muslims in newspaper advertisements with a value of $68,690. Nalliah and Scot refused, with Nalliah comparing the legislation to "sharia law", calling it a "a foul law" and "invalid", while Mr Scot stated that "You don't compromise truth for fear of jail".

On 14 December 2006, the defendants took their case to the Victorian Court of Appeal, which overturned the VCAT decision.

On 22 June 2007, the matter was resolved by mediation between the parties. VCAT published a statement agreed to by both parties which affirmed everyone's rights to "robustly debate religion including the right to criticise the religious belief of another, in a free, open and democratic society".

=== United Patriots Front ===
In September 2017 three prominent members of the far-right United Patriots Front — Blair Cottrell, Neil Erikson and Chris Shortis — were charged with inciting serious contempt of Muslims, among other offences. They had in 2015 enacted and made a video of a fake beheading, in order to protest against the building of a mosque in Bendigo.

Cottrell lodged an appeal, applying for his case to be heard in the High Court of Australia and arguing that he had been charged under an "invalid law". This was thrown out in February 2019, and he tried to have the matter heard in the Supreme Court of Victoria. The district court judge ruled that there were matters to be decided in her court, such as his intentions in making the video, before the case could proceed to a higher court, and set a date for the appeal to be heard in the County Court. The County Court dismissed Cottrell's appeal in December 2019. The judge also said: “even if the ends were political, the means remain vilifying. Having a political end is not a defence to the charge.“

== Criticism ==
Before the 2006 Victorian state election, Andrew McIntosh, the then state shadow Attorney General, announced that the Liberal Party would repeal the religious section of the "fundamentally flawed" Act. The Liberals did not win the election.

In January 2006, nineteen Christian leaders from Melbourne's largest churches wrote to the premier requesting the removal of the civil provisions in the act, claiming that aspects of the religious vilification law undermines multiculturalism.

== Repeal ==
From 30 June 2026, the legislation was repealed and replaced with the Justice Legislation Amendment (Anti-vilification and Social Cohesion) Act 2025.

== See also ==
- Hate speech laws in Australia
