= Q Society of Australia =

Former Australian anti-Islam organisation

The Q Society of Australia Inc. was an anti-Islam organisation that opposed Muslim immigration and the presence of Muslims in Australian society. Q Society described itself as "Australia's leading Islam-critical organisation" and stated that its purpose was to fight against the "Islamisation of Australia". The Q Society was so named because it was founded at a meeting in the Melbourne suburb of Kew in 2010.

The president of the Q Society was Debbie Robinson, who was also president of Australian Liberty Alliance and an unsuccessful Senate candidate for the party for Western Australia at the 2019 Australian federal election. She has been described as Australia's most established and high-profile member of the counter-jihad movement.

On 13 February 2020, the Q Society stated that it would deregister itself due to a considerable lack of financial support, being unable to cover basic administration costs, effective from 30 June 2020.

== History ==
=== Symposium on Liberty and Islam ===
In March 2014, the Q Society held a Symposium on Liberty and Islam in Melbourne. Speakers at the event included Nonie Darwish, an Egyptian-American human rights activist who was raised as a Muslim, and is director of Former Muslims United, an organisation set up to protect former Muslims from persecution. Geert Wilders appeared via video link criticising "politicians who don't share our values and foolishly declare all cultures are equal". Wilders was referring to Islam, suggesting that Muslim cultures are inferior to non-Muslim cultures. As with a previous visit by Wilders in 2013, a number of Australian newspapers refused to publish advertisements for the event.

=== Bendigo mosque protests ===
In 2014, the Q Society provided information and training to a number of groups involved in the Voices of Bendigo and Stop the Mosques Bendigo protests. The protests were held to oppose construction of a A$3-million mosque and Islamic community centre in the rural Victorian centre of Bendigo. The information and training was given to a number of groups, including a number of far-right and neo-Nazi groups including the militant white nationalist street gang Australian Defence League, the neo-Nazi True Blue Crew and the United Patriots Front.

Opponents of the mosque displayed anti-mosque information produced by Q Society at a meeting of the Bendigo City Council. During council meetings Q Society members distributed pamphlets that made numerous claims about mosques that included statements such as "A mosque is not like a church or a temple" and "[mosques] are a seat of government, a command centre, a court, and in some cases used as military training centres and arms depots".

=== El-Mouelhy defamation case ===
In 2015, Mohammed El-Mouelhy, the head of the Halal Certification Authority, commenced defamation proceedings against the Q Society and Kirralie Smith, who also runs the website HalalChoices, over their claims at a Q Society event that the halal certification in Australia is corrupt and funds "the push for sharia law in Australia", claiming that El-Mouelhy was portrayed as "part of a conspiracy to destroy Western civilisation from within" and "reasonably suspected of providing financial support to terrorist organisations". El-Mouelhy claimed he has been defamed in relation to the proceeds of halal certification.

In February 2017, the case was settled out of court, and as part of the settlement agreement, Smith and the Q Society publicly apologised and agreed to display notice of the settlement on their respective websites for one year.

In response to the claims made by Smith and HalalChoices, officials from the Australian Criminal Intelligence Commission stated that the commission has been on "heightened lookout" for links between halal certifiers and terrorism since the issue surfaced last year, but has "not found any direct linkages". A Senate inquiry into food certification asserted that there was "no link" between the religious approval process and extremist groups. It recommended that the federal government increase its oversight of domestic halal certifiers to address fraudulent conduct in the sector. It said that it had heard, "credible reports suggesting that the lack of regulation has been unscrupulously exploited". In tabling the report, committee chairman Sam Dastyari said, "Some certifiers are nothing more than scammers". The committee recommended a single halal certification authority. The committee in recommending clearer labelling, specifically referred to the need for meat processors to label products sourced from animals subject to religious slaughter.

=== 2017 fundraiser ===
On 9 February 2017, the Q Society held a fundraising dinner, which they described as Defending Freedom of Speech, that drew widespread criticism after Islamophobia and homophobia were documented. For example, guest speaker Larry Pickering stated "If they (Muslims) are in the same street as me, I start shaking" and "They are not all bad, they do chuck pillow-biters off buildings" adding "I can't stand Muslims". The cartoonist also auctioned an overtly Islamophobic work depicting the rape of a woman in a niqab by her son-in-law. Another Pickering cartoon auctioned at the fundraiser depicted an imam as a pig being spit roasted, with a "halal certified" stamp on its rump. A case of wine called "72 Virgins" was auctioned, as well a signed photograph of Dame Joan Sutherland. Kirralie Smith denied supporting Pickering's statements; however she reiterated parts of the speech stating that "there are Muslims that actually do throw gays off buildings!". Politicians Cory Bernardi and George Christensen attracted criticism for speaking at the event, which also drew protests for being racist. Ross Cameron also spoke as a VIP member at the fundraiser.

=== Guests and lecture tours ===
The group brought a number of controversial speakers to Australia, including Somali-born ex-Muslim activist Ayaan Hirsi Ali, UK planning lawyer and anti-mosque campaigner Gavin Boby, Sudanese human rights activist Simon Deng and far-right, anti-Islam Dutch politician Geert Wilders.

The Australian government initially delayed the issue of a visa for Wilders. However, the then Minister for Immigration and Citizenship, Chris Bowen, eventually granted the visa. The tour was overshadowed by a total of 30 venues refusing or cancelling bookings.

Former Premier of Western Australia, Colin Barnett, stated that Wilders was not welcome in his State. Islamic leaders in Sydney and Melbourne recommended that these talks be ignored, so as to avoid or minimise the possibility of violent protests. An estimated 200 protestors picketed the Melbourne event.

== Commentary and criticism ==
Critics of Q Society suggest the organisation is responsible for hate-mongering against Muslims, describing Q Society as a modern example of "organised intolerance".

In 2011, Q Society circulated a petition objecting to a Muslim prayer group in St Kilda, a suburb of Melbourne. Several Jewish community leaders in Melbourne opposed the petition. Deborah Stone of the B'nai B'rith Anti-Defamation Commission (ADC), which actively counters prejudice against Jews (including from fundamentalist Muslims) stated that the fears of the Q Society were greatly exaggerated: "Assuming Muslims are terrorists is the same as expecting that Italians running a restaurant will be using it as a Mafia hideout, or that the local Catholic school is sheltering a paedophile priest". The Port Phillip council strongly supported social diversity and multiculturalism, and the Muslim prayer group had not caused concern until the Q Society intervened.

In 2014, following the group's involvement in the Voices of Bendigo and Stop the Mosques Bendigo protests, State MP Jacinta Allan described the group's actions as an attempt to divide the community, stating that "Bendigo has a proud history of tolerance and diversity dating back to the gold rush era, and we'll work hard to preserve and build upon it".

== Political affiliations ==
Several prominent members and supporters of Q Society are current or former members of the Liberal–National Coalition including Cory Bernardi, George Christensen, Angry Anderson and Ross Cameron. Bernardi and Christensen were criticised for speaking at the Q Society fundraising event in February 2017, an event which protesters called racist. In 2012 the organisation took part in a "Global Counter Jihad rally" in Stockholm along with several international organisations, including Stop Islamization of Nations (SION), and again in Melbourne in 2014.

Kirralie Smith and Debbie Robinson, both members of the Q Society, were founding members of the far-right political party Australian Liberty Alliance (now called Yellow Vest Australia). Smith was an ALA Senate candidate for New South Wales at the 2016 federal election. At that election the party also endorsed former National Party candidate Angry Anderson as its candidate for the Senate representing New South Wales. On 7 April 2017, Smith, still a member of the Q Society, joined the Australian Conservatives.

Robinson continued to be the president of Yellow Vest Australia, and was that party's Senate candidate for Western Australia at the 2019 federal election.

== See also ==
- Far-right politics in Australia
- Islamophobia in Australia
- Counter-jihad
- Criticism of Islam
- Yellow Vest Australia
