= Antipodean Resistance =

Australian neo-Nazi hate group

- (flag)
- Abbreviation: AR
- Named after: 'Antipodes' meaning related to Australia and New Zealand
- Successor: National Socialist Network
- Formation: October 12, 2016; 10 years ago
- Founded at: Melbourne
- Type: Neo-Nazi hate group
- Legal status: Active. In violation of The Anti-Discrimination Act 1998 (Tasmania). Associated with proscribed American and British terrorist groups and organisations Monitored by state and federal law enforcement including ASIO
- Purpose: Neo-Nazism; White supremacy Antisemitism; Homophobia; Fascism; Australian nationalism Anti-multiculturalism; Anti-Chinese sentiment Anti-immigration
- Headquarters: Melbourne
- Location: Melbourne, Sydney
- Origins: Melbourne
- Region served: Primarily in Victoria and New South Wales
- Official language: English
- Parent organization: Iron March
- Affiliations: National Action (UK); Nordic Resistance Movement; Atomwaffen Division

Antipodean Resistance (AR) is an Australian neo-Nazi and militant accelerationist hate group. The group, formed in October 2016, uses the slogan "We're the Hitlers you've been waiting for" and makes use of Nazi symbols such as the swastika and the Nazi salute. AR's logo features the Black Sun and Totenkopf (death's head) with an Akubra hat, a laurel wreath and a swastika.

Antipodean Resistance promotes and incites hatred and violence, distributing racist, homophobic and antisemitic posters and propaganda. In 2018, its website was shut down by its hosting provider. ASIO, Australia's national security agency, has been monitoring the group since at least 2017.

== History ==
Antipodean Resistance (AR) was formed on the now-defunct Iron March forum, which was a far-right forum describing itself as a fascist social network, and which appears to have been home to many white supremacists, neo-Nazis and other right-wing extremists. Members of the website formed groups such as Atomwaffen Division and Antipodean Resistance. Tim Heibach (aka Xav, aka Mathew Baston, aka Matty B) was a founding member of Antipodean Resistance, and other members included Jacob Hersant.

=== Racist vandalism ===
AR has attracted attention for its Nazi-inspired vandalism in major cities in Australia. It has targeted schools in Melbourne with significant ethnic minority populations, placing posters carrying messages such as "Keep Australia White" and "Australia For The White Man" along with several other racial slurs targeting Aboriginal and Torres Strait Islander people, Chinese Australians and African Australians which were described as "vile and disgusting" by the Victorian education minister James Merlino. The group also placed a series of Chinese-language posters at numerous university campuses threatening Chinese students with deportation.

=== Homophobic propaganda ===
In the lead-up to the Australian Marriage Law Postal Survey, AR targeted churches, universities and public places with homophobic propaganda linking same-sex marriage and paedophilia.

=== National Party of Australia ban ===
In 2018, the NSW Nationals unanimously adopted a resolution banning 22 people for life after an investigation into alleged infiltration by people with links to neo-Nazi and fascist groups. The resolution also banned any party member from joining a number of specific organisations, including Antipodean Resistance.

=== National Socialist Network ===
In 2020, the Antipodean Resistance and another far-right group, the Lads Society, allegedly formed the National Socialist Network.

== Membership ==
The membership of AR is reported to be very small. The group is only open to who are "able to take a hit" for their beliefs. Members assume a pseudonym in an attempt to remain anonymous. Media outlets have reported that AR have organised secret radicalisation camps in remote forests. AR has been banned from a number of social media and online hosting platforms.

== Terrorism concerns ==
Several counter-terrorism experts have suggested authorities should focus more on far-right extremists such as Antipodean Resistance. Anne Aly, the Labor MP, in 2017 suggested that the group may turn to terrorism, stating "For a terrorist attack to succeed, it really only takes one person." She called for the group to be banned, stating "I would like to see some of these groups proscribed ... as terrorist and violent organisations."

It was reported in 2017 that ASIO, the Australian national security organisation, was monitoring the group, who were "willing to use violence to further their own interests."

== See also ==
- National Socialist Network
- Jacob Hersant, former member
