= Australian Liberty Alliance =

- Abbreviation: ALA
- President: Debbie Robinson
- Founded: 28 July 2015; 11 years ago (Note: Founded in July 2015, the party was formally re-named on 7 April 2019, 41 days before the 2019 federal election.)
- Dissolved: 4 September 2020; 6 years ago
- Headquarters: South Melbourne, Victoria, Australia
- Membership (2016): 2,000
- Ideology: Anti-Islam; Australian nationalism; Conservatism (Australian); Anti-immigration
- Political position: Right-wing to far-right
- Party affiliation: Party for Freedom (PVV) (Note: Party for Freedom's Geert Wilders was a keynote speaker at the foundation of the party in Perth and was a high-profile figure touting an “anti-islam” party for Australia, based on his own party's values.)
- Colours: Blue; Red

Website
- australianlibertyalliance.org.au

Logo of Yellow Vest Australia.

Australian Liberty Alliance (ALA), briefly known as the Yellow Vest Australia (YVA) between 2019 and 2020, was a minor right-wing to far-right political party in Australia. The party was founded by members of the Q Society and has been described as its political wing. The leader was Debbie Robinson (President), who was also national president of the Q Society. On 4 September 2020, the Australian Electoral Commission removed the Yellow Vest Australia from the registered political party list.

The party's core policy was opposition to Islam, with policies focusing on Muslim immigration such as enforcing "integration over separation", replacing multiculturalism with an integrated multi-ethnic society and stopping public funding for "associations formed around foreign nationalities", vowing to "stop the Islamisation of Australia". Party president Debbie Robinson made a number of statements critical of Islam, including that Islam is "a totalitarian ideology that does not separate its law from its religious entity", and that "slowly but surely our Judeo-Christian values, ethics and customs are being replaced". She claimed that "if we continue to tolerate Islam without understanding it, Australia as a free, secular democracy will be lost".

Other policies included promoting smaller government, privatising public broadcaster SBS and scaling down the Australian Broadcasting Corporation, opposing taxpayer-funded subsidies for renewable energy, promoting advanced nuclear energy, ending dual citizenship for new citizenship applicants, simplifying the tax system with less income tax and a stronger focus on GST, improving public healthcare by more efficient cooperation with the private healthcare sector, advancing the 'natural family', and restoring civil society.

== Policies and ideology ==
The party released a manifesto listing twenty key policy areas, including "smarter smaller government", "integration over separation," and "real reconciliation: no place for apartheid in Australia." However, the party focused most of its efforts on its criticism of Islam. That included the party's policy to "stop the Islamisation of Australia", and their efforts to bring to Australia noted anti-Islamic speakers such as Geert Wilders.

=== Immigration ===
The party was focused on stopping immigration from Organisation of Islamic Cooperation (OIC) member countries into Australia. It wanted Australia to focus its refugee efforts to preference white South African refugees, which the party claims have been victims of South African farm attacks. It also called for Islamic organisations, including mosques and Islamic schools in Australia to respect the human rights and Australian law.

One of their stated goals is to defend human rights and prevent any Sharia court system from being established.

=== Environment ===
The party claimed that they were "neither 'believers' nor 'deniers' when it comes to climate change". They were critical of propositions that taxing CO_{2} emissions would have a noticeable effect on the global climate system. ALA has raised doubts about the competency of certain scientists and that their studies "are not based on scientific fact, but on computerised speculations and consent among special interest groups", and about climate change in general with their claim that "extreme natural events were described in Australian poetry a century before the Intergovernmental Panel on Climate Change created hysteria about rising sea levels".

== Electoral history ==
The Australian Liberty Alliance performed poorly at both state and federal elections it has contested.

The party was registered with the Australian Electoral Commission (AEC) on 28 July 2015 and was officially launched at a private function on 20 October 2015 in Perth, with controversial Dutch politician Geert Wilders and British anti-sharia activist Anne Marie Waters as keynote speakers. The party had extensive connections with the international counter-jihad movement.

At the 2016 Australian federal election, ALA fielded 13 senate candidates and 10 House of Representatives candidates. The party received only 25,337 primary votes in total in the House of Representatives and 102,982 primary votes or 0.74% of the total in the senate. It recorded 0.66% of the senate vote in New South Wales and Victoria, 0.42% in South Australia, 0.33% in Tasmania, 1.08% in Queensland and 1.11% in Western Australia. Their best result in the House of Representatives was the Division of Farrer, where they polled 6.08%. The party spent $1.5 million on the campaign. On 7 April 2017, Kirralie Smith, a former candidate for the Australian Liberty Alliance and a member of the Q Society and Senate candidate for New South Wales in 2016, joined the Australian Conservatives.

On 1 October 2018, ALA registered as a political party in Victoria, and contested the 2018 Victorian election. Contesting only the district of Yan Yean, the party received 2.5% of the primary votes in the seat and 0.56% for the Victorian Legislative Council. Avi Yemini ran for the party as the lead candidate for the Southern Metropolitan Region in the Legislative Council, where the party received 2,075 votes or 0.48% of the total.

The party has contested several by-elections where it also polled poorly. The party polled 0.85% of the vote at the 2017 Bennelong by-election, 1.39% at the 2018 Batman by-election, 1.18% at the 2018 Perth by-election, and 0.20% at the 2018 Wentworth by-election.

On 9 April 2019, the AEC approved the party's name change to "Yellow Vest Australia", in time to allow the party to field candidates at the 2019 Australian federal election under the party's new name. The party nominated two candidates for the Senate for Victoria and Western Australia. Party president Debbie Robinson (who was also the president of Q Society and stood for the Senate in WA) stated that the new name was inspired by the yellow vests movement in France, claiming that the movement shared the party's representation of "disgruntled voters who are concerned about globalism, immigration (and) the cost of living". She also hoped the change would end confusion with the name of the Liberal Party of Australia.

=== Results ===
==== Federal parliament ====
House of Representatives
Election year	# of overall votes	% of overall vote	# of overall seats won	+/–
2016	25,337	0.19 (#13/45)	0 / 150	Steady

Senate
Election year	# of overall votes	% of overall vote	# of overall seats won	# of overall seats	+/–
2016	103,035	0.74 (#12/49)	0 / 40	0 / 76	Steady
2019	3,263	0.02 (#45/45)	0 / 40	0 / 76	Steady

==== State parliaments ====
Victorian Legislative Assembly
Election year	# of overall votes	% of overall vote	# of overall seats won	+/–
2018	1,232	0.04(#15/15)	0 / 88	▲0

Victorian Legislative Council
Election year	# of overall votes	% of overall vote	# of overall seats won	# of overall seats	+/–
2018	20,065	0.56(#17/19)	0 / 40	0 / 40	▲0

== Deregistration ==
In 2019, the Victorian Electoral Commission (VEC) reviewed all registered political parties. Following that, the Australian Liberty Alliance voluntarily de-registered in Victoria and could not re-register as a political party until after the 2022 Victorian election.

In 2020, the Australian Electoral Commission removed Yellow Vest Australia from the list of registered political parties.

== See also ==
- Conservatism in Australia
- Far-right politics in Australia
- Q Society of Australia
