= Reclaim Australia =

Australian far-right group

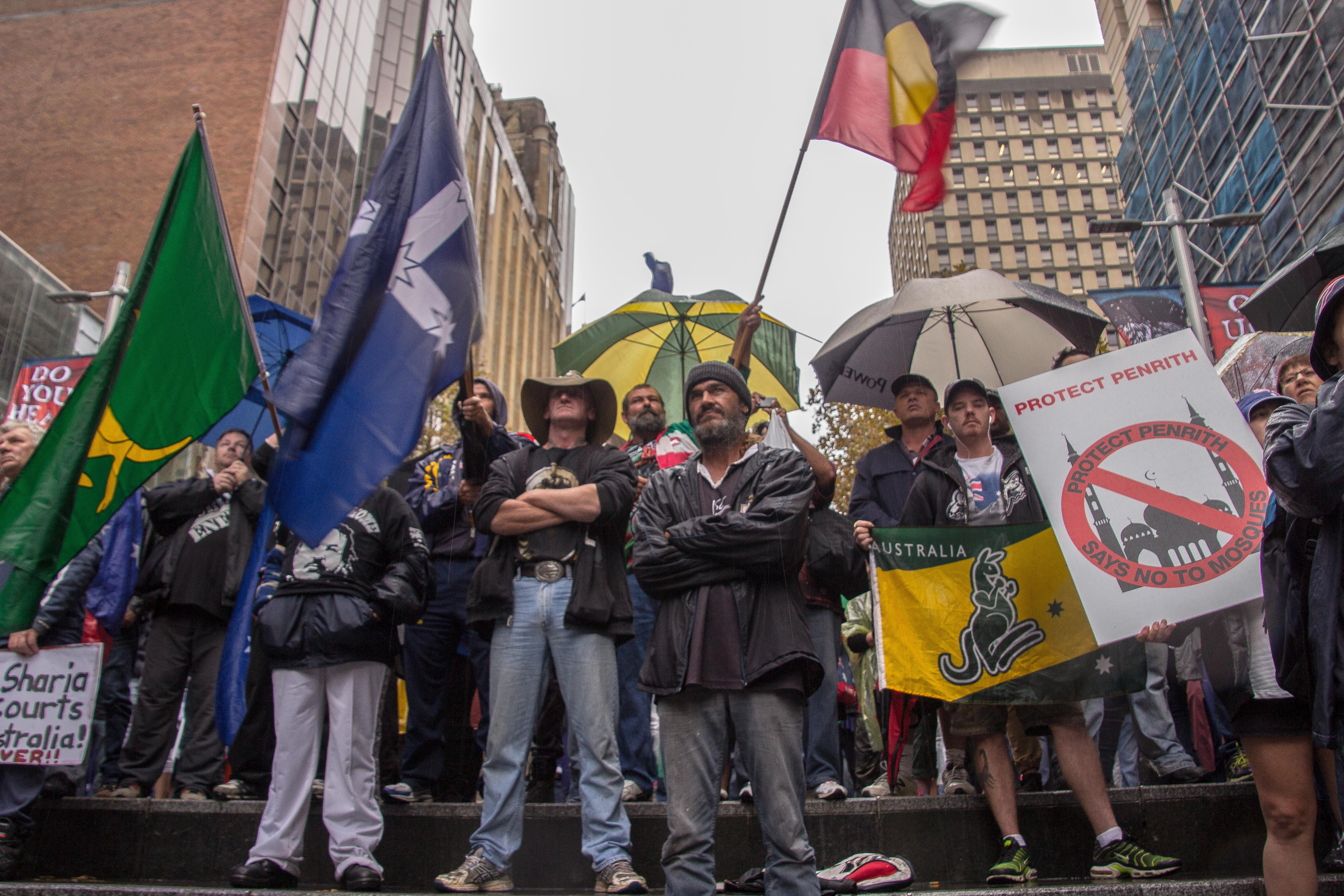
- Reclaim Australia rally in Martin Place, Sydney, April 2015
- Formation: 2015
- Purpose: Australian nationalism Islamophobia; Far-right politics
- Location(s): Sydney; Melbourne; Brisbane; Adelaide; Canberra; Newcastle
- Region served: New South Wales; Victoria; Queensland; South Australia; Australian Capital Territory

Reclaim Australia was a far-right Australian nationalist protest group which associated with nationalist and neo-Nazi hate groups. The group was formed in 2015, holding street rallies in cities across Australia to protest against Islam. It protested in Sydney, Melbourne, Brisbane, Perth, Adelaide, Newcastle and Canberra. Reclaim Australia was also been described as a loose collective of groups.

== Ideology ==
Reclaim Australia primarily opposes the practice of Islam in Australia and is considered Islamophobic. Proponents of the Reclaim Australia movement called for the persecution of Muslims. The group has attracted the involvement of neo-Nazis in promoting and attending Reclaim Australia rallies. Speakers at Reclaim Australia rallies have been known to express extremist views, with one speaker in South Australia warning of the risks of "Islamic barbarity" and encouraging those in attendance to "insult and vilify Islam five times a day if you want to".

== Rallies ==
In April and July 2015 Reclaim Australia organised rallies in several Australian cities. Speakers at these rallies included Danny Nalliah, Pauline Hanson, and George Christensen. Reclaim Australia has said that the rallies are a "public response to Islamic extremism and a protest against minority groups who want to change the Australian cultural identity." A number of protesters from both sides of the rally were arrested for violent behaviour.

In February 2016, Reclaim Australia held nationwide rallies that overwhelmed counter protestors.

In January 2017, a rally in Sydney was attended by only dozens of the approximately 400 people who had registered to attend.

Reclaim Australia has played a number of popular Australian songs at its rallies. Some songwriters have requested that their songs not be played at these rallies, including: Jimmy Barnes (Khe Sanh), John Farnham (You're the Voice), John Schumann (I Was Only 19), John Williamson (True Blue), Shane Howard (Solid Rock), and Midnight Oil (Short Memory). Lee Kernaghan said his song "Spirit of the Anzacs" should be played at public events only if these were respectful to the memory of fallen servicemen and women.

Street rallies held by Reclaim Australia have faced counter-protests from human rights and anti-racism activists, anarchists, trade unionists, and members of the Socialist Alliance.

The Australian domestic security agency, the Australian Security Intelligence Organisation, says the group is of interest and staff have been assigned to monitor it because of the potential for further violence.

== Structure and leadership ==
According to political history lecturer Troy Whitford, Reclaim Australia is unlike previous short-lived radical nationalist groups. The movement has avoided becoming a structured organisation, draws a broader support base, and lacks high-profile leaders who become a focus for opponents.

The founders of the group are Wanda Marsh, John Oliver and Liz Shepherd. Shepherd has said that she had never been politically active, but the 2014 siege at the Lindt Café was a turning point for her.

After observing many Reclaim Australia rallies and interviewing participants, author John Safran described it as a loose collective of different groups such as the United Patriots Front and Danny Nalliah's Catch the Fire Ministries. The UPF has also been described as a splinter group from Reclaim Australia. Its members have taken part in Reclaim Australia rallies, and in July 2015 police confiscated a registered firearm from a licensed gun-owner before he travelled on a bus with UPF members to a rally in Melbourne. The same month, organisers of a Brisbane rally told the crowd that they had split from Reclaim Australia to join a group that was more explicitly anti-Islamic.

In the Australian Capital Territory election of 2016, a Canberra organiser with Reclaim Australia, Daniel Evans, ran as an independent candidate in the electorate of Yerrabi. He won 0.5 percent of the vote.

As of 2019, the most extreme members of Reclaim Australia had splintered off into more extreme groups, most notably True Blue Crew and the United Patriots Front.

== See also ==
- March for Australia
- Far-right politics in Australia
- Islamophobia in Australia
- National Action (Australia)
- Romper Stomper (TV series) – TV series featuring a group similar to Reclaim Australia
- True Blue Crew – Reclaim Australia splinter group
- United Patriots Front – Reclaim Australia splinter group
- Pegida similar group in Germany and Europe
