= 2005 Cronulla riots =

Series of race riots in Sydney, New South Wales, Australia

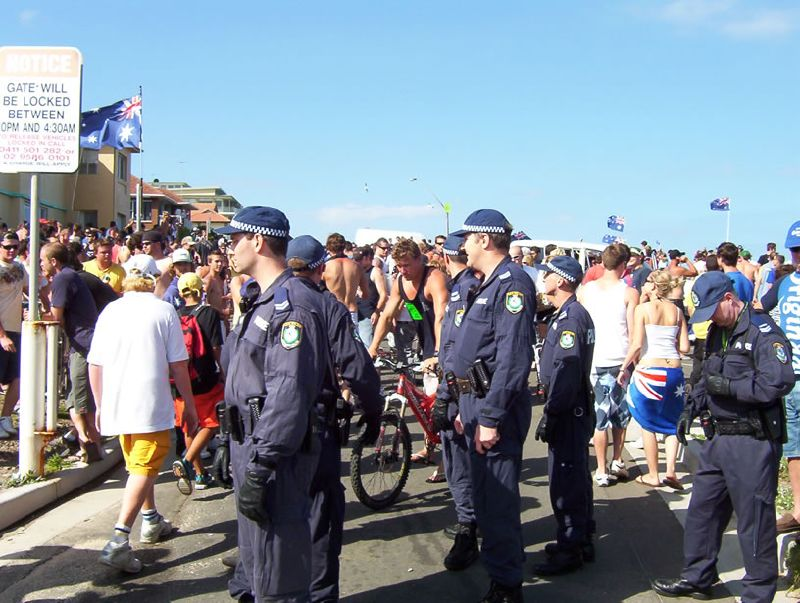
- NSW Police observing crowds prior to confrontation.
- Date: 11–12 December 2005
- Location: Cronulla (spreading to Maroubra, Punchbowl, Lakemba, Arncliffe and Brighton-Le-Sands) in Sydney, New South Wales, Australia
- Caused by: Racism, Islamophobia, Anti-arabism, Arab violence on lifeguards
- Methods: Race riot, assault, vandalism, arson, violence
- Result: Riots quelled

Parties
European Australian residents Including: Australia First Party; Patriotic Youth League; Bra Boys	Middle Eastern Australian residents (primarily Lebanese Arabs)	New South Wales Police Supported by: New South Wales Government

Casualties
- Injuries: 26
- Arrested: 104 (285 charges laid)

The Cronulla riots were a series of race riots in Sydney, New South Wales, Australia. They began in the beachside suburb of Cronulla on 11 December 2005, and over the following nights spread to additional suburbs. The instigating event was a physical altercation on 4 December between a group of youths of Middle Eastern descent and lifeguards at Cronulla beach, following reports of assault of lifeguards and harassment by "young Lebanese men." Following reporting by the tabloid media and shock jocks on local radio, a racially motivated gathering was organised via chain texting.

On the morning of Sunday, 11 December, a crowd gathered at Cronulla. By midday, approximately 5,000 people had gathered near the beach. As the gathering began attacking members of ethnic minorities, the police attempted to intervene. Violence spread to neighbouring suburbs, where assaults occurred, including attacks on ambulances and police officers. Two people were stabbed during these events, and travel warnings for Australia were briefly issued by some countries.

The riots were widely condemned by members of parliament, police, and local community leaders and residents. A large police effort over subsequent months produced many arrests. Some media were criticised, and well-known radio personality Alan Jones was formally censured and fined for his broadcasts during the week.

== Chronology ==
=== Background ===
New South Wales Police had been recording racial and ethnic tensions and incidents in and around Cronulla since October 2005. There is also a history of conflict between Cronulla locals and visiting beachgoers from the western suburbs ("Westies") with "bashings" (physical assault) common since the 1960s as part of a turf war between Westies and local surfers. There remains a great deal of debate as to whether previous racially charged attacks in the area like the Sydney gang rapes contributed to the tensions, or if the subsequent trials were used as justification for the attacks, despite many reporting otherwise. The previous summer on Australia Day (26 January 2005), a non-racial riot occurred with around 2,000 to 3,000 young people in the Cronulla area engaged in "civil disobedience", at one stage hurling missiles at police attempting to control the crowd.

=== 4 December 2005 ===
Just after 15:00 on Sunday, 4 December 2005, police were called to North Cronulla Beach following a report of an assault on two off-duty male surf lifesavers by four members of a group of eight men. A verbal exchange had taken place after three lifesavers approached a group of four young men with a Lebanese background on Cronulla Beach, with both groups accusing the other of staring at them. One of the Australian Lebanese men reportedly responded to the accusations, "I'm allowed to; now fuck off and leave our beach", to which a lifesaver responded, "I come down here out of my own spare time to save you cunts from drowning".

The verbal exchange escalated with one Australian Lebanese youth attempting to defuse the situation. Another Australian Lebanese youth then threw a punch, missing, prompting a pushing match that escalated into a fight. One of the lifesavers was badly hurt after falling and striking his head. One of the lifesavers later informed police that the four were part of a group of eight Australian Lebanese that had been on the beach most of the day and that there had been no problems with their prior behaviour. Despite media reports to the contrary, no Middle Eastern men converged on the area and there were no more than the original eight present.

=== Media reporting ===
What kind of grubs? Well I'll tell you what kind of grubs this lot were. This lot were Middle Eastern grubs.

— Alan Jones, 5 December 2005, on 2GB radio

One media report stated that there was already tension between the community and Australian Lebanese youths before this event and people, particularly women, claimed to have been harassed, almost daily, by "groups of young Lebanese men" attempting to "pick them up" and describing the women as being "Aussie sluts".

The events were reported widely across the Sydney media, particularly tabloid; also generating discussions on talkback radio. When a listener identified as "Berta" commented to shock jock Alan Jones of Sydney's 2GB Radio that she had heard "really derogatory remarks" aimed at Middle Eastern people, Jones interrupted stating "We don't have Anglo-Saxon kids out there raping women in Western Sydney". Jones also broadcast and endorsed one listener's suggestion that bikie gangs be brought down to Cronulla railway station to deal with "Lebanese thugs" and that the event be televised, arguing that despite their notoriety bikie gangs do "a lot of good things". By Thursday, Jones had stirred significant discussion, and stated "I'm the person that's led this charge here. Nobody wanted to know about North Cronulla, now it's gathered to this."

After the riots, Jones was found to have breached the Australian Communications and Media Authority (ACMA) Code of Conduct section 1.3(a), as his comments were "likely to encourage violence or brutality and to vilify people of Lebanese and Middle-Eastern backgrounds on the basis of ethnicity". In December 2009, the NSW Administrative Decisions Tribunal found Jones and radio station 2GB guilty of vilifying Lebanese Muslims in earlier "Cronulla Riot" broadcasts. A fine of $10,000 was imposed.

Police were concerned about the repercussions of these events. Later investigations revealed that over 270,000 individual SMS text messages were transmitted inciting a racially motivated confrontation at North Cronulla Beach the following Saturday.

=== 11 December 2005 ===
Over the course of Sunday, 11 December 2005, approximately 5,000 people gathered in and around North Cronulla Beach. Early in the morning, people began to gather and impromptu barbecues and "partying" took place. However at 12:59, a young man of "Middle Eastern appearance" was spotted on the beach and the crowds began "chanting stuff [and] yelling out things" before rushing him. The man attempted to avoid the crowd by quickly entering "Northies", a local pub, but the crowd forcibly dragged him out and attacked him. The police, having been in Cronulla since the early morning (including police helicopters and patrol boats), quickly intervened and resolved the situation. A Cronulla High School teacher later claimed that the crowd had attacked the man after he had shouted "I'm going to blow youse all up".

At 13:30, two women verbally argued with a small group; the police arrived and both parties left. However, an hour later, they again met and a scuffle ensued. At 13:45, another two boys from Bangladesh were surrounded by the crowd, and had bottles thrown at them, with the crowd repeatedly chanting "Fuck off Lebs!". The two boys escaped by car, which was smashed, stomped on and pelted with objects along the way. Chants and slogans such as "Fuck off Lebs!", "We grew here, you flew here", "Aussie Pride", "Fuck off wogs!", were repeated and displayed throughout the day by the crowd. The crowd also attacked the police by throwing beer bottles. Police vehicles were also prevented from entering the area. Around 14:00 another three males were assaulted on the beach with the crowd throwing sausages and beer bottles at them.

Rumours had persisted throughout the day that an additional 600 people would arrive by train, mostly from the west of Cronulla, to join the crowds. At approximately 15:00, "two young men of Middle Eastern appearance" arrived at Cronulla train station with the crowd outside chanting "Fuck off wogs!". The two men (one of whom was a Russian-born Afghan) took refuge in the train. However, the mob entered the carriage and began assaulting them; a police officer entered the train and forcibly cleared the crowd, later being found to have used excessive force.

At 15:20, two separate assaults took place; one involved a crowd attacking a man of "Middle Eastern appearance" and throwing beer bottles. In this case an officer intervened and removed the victim as they were both struck by the bottles. A second assault took place outside a takeaway restaurant; three men were taken inside the restaurant as refuge and the diners already inside were moved towards the back. The glass doors and windows were broken and those inside were moved outside without incident.

=== Injuries and arrests ===
By the end of the day, 26 people had been treated for injuries. The 15:20 assault required the victim and the police officer to receive hospital treatment. A total of 16 were arrested and charged with 42 offences including: malicious damage, assaulting a police officer, affray, offensive conduct, resisting arrest and numerous driving offences. One police officer was hit by a car and two ambulance officers were also amongst the injured as their ambulance, under mounted police escort, was surrounded and beer bottles were thrown, with one of the ambulance officers being hit on the head by a bottle and the other receiving lacerations on the arm.

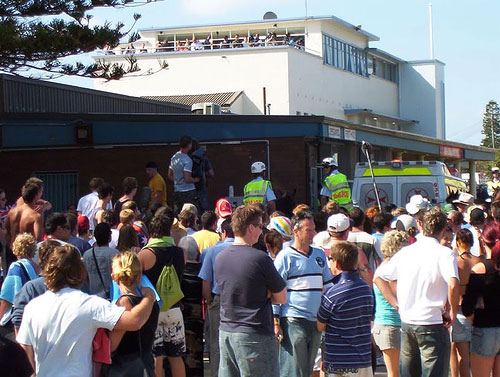
Crowd with mounted police and ambulance in background. Near North Cronulla Beach First Aid room

=== Evening retaliation ===
At 19:45, around 100 locals of Punchbowl (a suburb 20 kilometres [12 mi] to Cronulla's northwest) gathered together at the local Punchbowl Park. Additional groups, armed with baseball bats, also gathered at The Promenade and Arncliffe Park. Between 20:30 and 21:00, the groups of young men of Middle Eastern descent formed a convoy of "more than 40 cars" and drove down to the beaches "to get revenge" with many of the cars ending up in Maroubra. At 22:45, police were ordered "not to approach convoys of men of Middle Eastern appearance"; however car details and registration details were to be recorded.

A local of Maroubra reported that each of the cars that arrived was "full, you know, had four passengers". The convoy was reportedly armed with bars and bats, knives, machetes and guns. The group assaulted several people, knocking one unconscious and threatening another with rape, and damaged between 60 and 100 cars, setting at least one on fire in Arden Street, Coogee. Police in riot gear moved to contain the violence and the crowds responded by throwing bricks and glass. Residents reported that in some streets "every car" had had their windows smashed, with glass covering the streets. Police also confiscated 40 iron bars and arrested 14 people.

At approximately 22:25, a 26-year-old mechanic Dan Gray was stabbed in the back three times and twice in the thigh with a 9.8 cm (3.9 in) blade. The incident occurred outside Woolooware golf club when two cars carrying a group of males "described as being of Mediterranean or Middle Eastern appearance" approached the man and his friends. Dan and his friends attempted to flee from the group, who were shouting "Get the Aussie dogs... get the Aussie sluts". Dan was knocked to the ground and was repeatedly kicked in the head. The attack ended when the knife snapped off in the victim's back. He was taken to hospital in a serious condition as the blade had narrowly missed his spine and lungs. The getaway driver for the attack was arrested and held in jail for 9 months, after which he was paroled 5 months later for good behaviour.

A man named Jake Schofield was attacked by a group of four men of "Middle Eastern appearance", who beat him repeatedly, stabbing him twice and hitting him with a piece of concrete before stealing his wallet and keys. The attack left him with a fractured eye socket and nose. All four assailants were arrested and charged.

A woman wearing a headscarf had her car stopped by a group of white males and was then abused and threatened by this group.

== Aftermath ==
Additional smaller riots occurred on the following nights in the suburbs of Maroubra, Brighton-le-Sands and Cronulla. Text messages similar to the earlier 270,000 inciting racial violence had also turned up in other states including Queensland, Victoria and Western Australia.

On 12 December, rioters had written various messages including; "Aussi [sic] to Die", "Intifada", "It's war", "Sunday cowards die, Soldiers rize [sic]", "Never rest assie [sic] dog", "We came in planes yous came by chains u convict dogs", and "We fear no ozy [sic] pigs" before continuing to destroy cars and local shops. Approximately 2000 people gathered inside Lakemba Mosque with another 800 gathered outside the evening after the riot. Sheikh Shady Alsuleiman spoke to the crowd and called for calm. However some were armed with Glock pistols which were displayed to the media. At least some of the people gathered were reported to have planned to go on to Maroubra; however the police blocked roads leading into Maroubra and 20 police cars surrounded the mosque. The Uniting Church in Auburn, a predominantly Tongan congregation, was burned and those attending Christmas carols were abused and threatened. More than 30 Molotov cocktails were also confiscated by police.

Eight hundred police officers formed Operation Seta and were on patrol on the following nights, with up to 450 police officers blockading Cronulla on the night of 13 December and an additional 11 people were arrested; five were arrested in relation to a replica pistol and six were arrested for property damage. An additional seven people were injured including another police officer. A husband and wife were taken to hospital after the wife was struck in the head and the husband tried to defend her, and another man was struck by a baseball bat and suffered a fractured forearm.

== Groups involved in the riots ==
The far-right political party known as the Australia First Party claimed that 120 members and supporters attended the riots, and both members of the AFP and their youth wing, the Patriotic Youth League, were seen handing out anti-immigration leaflets and supplying alcohol there. The now defunct Patriotic Youth League also played a part by distributing white power leaflets in the days prior to the riots, and held banners saying "Aussies fighting back" during the riots.

== Criminal prosecutions ==
By 19 July 2006, police had laid 285 charges against 104 people, 51 having been arrested as a result of the original Cronulla riot and 53 arrested from the retaliation riots. These persons were charged with, amongst other things: malicious damage, possession or use of a prohibited weapon, assaulting police, rioting, resisting arrest, threatening violence and affray.

- Ali Osman, 18, was charged with affray and assault occasioning actual bodily harm for the original attacks he committed on 4 December 2005 against the volunteer lifesavers and was given 300 hours of community service for the assault and 200 hours for affray, though they would be served concurrently. Osman was the only person charged over the initial confrontation. Magistrate Jacqueline Trad (herself of Lebanese descent) told Sutherland Local Court that Osman had turned his back on his real country: "By this sort of conduct you turned your back on your family, your culture and your real country, all for the sake of some juvenile, impulsive and misplaced allegiance.... Over the last 100 years or so, the ancestors of many citizens – mine included – came to this country seeking refuge from hatred, intolerance, violence or just simply the opportunity to improve their families' prospects."
- Yahya Jamal Serhan was arrested over the stabbing of "Dan" on 12 December and charged with affray and maliciously inflicting grievous bodily harm and was sentenced to 13 months jail but was immediately released after having already spent nine months in custody awaiting trial. Dan was angered and disappointed by the sentence, saying "I've got no feeling on the left hand side of my back where the knife broke off." A second person, a 17-year-old, was also questioned by police.
- Marcus Kapitza, 28, was jailed for 12 months after pleading guilty to one charge of riot. On the day of the riot Kapitza wore a singlet with the words "Mohammed was a camel-raping faggot". He was also involved in the attack at the Cronulla train station shouting "Fuck off! Fuck off the Lebs".
- Brent Lohman, 19, was also charged over the Cronulla train station assault, and was sentenced to 11 months in jail.
- Two of the youths who attacked Jake Schofield turned themselves in to police and were charged with armed robbery, wounding, malicious wounding with intent, affray and assault occasioning actual bodily harm. Two others, Wael Tahan and Mahmoud Eid, had been arrested on the night of the attack but were released without charge before being rearrested and charged with robbery in company, malicious wounding causing grievous bodily harm and affray.
- Brett Andrew King appeared in court in January 2006 charged with sending two text messages 42 times for a retaliatory riot on 18 December 2005.
- Jeffrey Ismail was also charged with sending two text messages under the pseudonym of John Gotti.
- A 16-year-old Lebanese immigrant, Ali Ammar, was arrested and jailed for seven months for stealing and burning an Australian flag from the Brighton-le-Sands Returned and Services League of Australia (RSL) club. Following his release, Ammar appeared on television to present an official apology and in 2007 he was sponsored by the RSL to walk the Kokoda Track after the State President of the New South Wales RSL met him at a Reconciliation Conference.

=== Strike Force Enoggera ===
Strike Force Enoggera was established on 13 December 2005, tasked with investigating the riots. The strike force initially consisted of 28 members under the command of Superintendent Dennis Bray, but was increased to 100 officers on 20 January 2006. During a radio interview, New South Wales Police Commissioner Ken Moroney claimed to have no video footage of the retaliatory attacks on 11 December; however it was later revealed that the police had had a video for five weeks, leading Moroney to sack Bray, who was later reinstated to a lesser role, having been replaced by Detective Superintendent Ken Mckay.

== Responses ==
=== Media and community responses ===
We knew always there was racism, but we never knew it was to this extent. I mean, all your life you've been – you've been raised to be Australian. I mean, you carry the Australian flag. When you go to sports events and all that, you're happy to be Australian and all that. And all of sudden people reject you. "Go home!" They shout your names. Like, "Go home, you Middle Eastern Lebs," or whatever. "Go home." I mean, that's a shock to us. "Go home." I mean, like, you get cut inside your heart, you know. Like you feel like you're not part of society no more.

— Eiad Diyab, a local of Punchbowl, talking to Four Corners

Brian Wilshire, a 2GB radio host, stated the following weekend on air, "Many of them have parents who are first cousins whose parents are first cousins, the result of this inbreeding — the result of which is uneducationable [sic] people... and very low IQ", comments for which he later apologised.

An anti-racism rally, attended by 2,000 people, was held in Bourke Street, Melbourne, Victoria. Apologies for the riots at Cronulla were later issued on behalf of some local surf clubs, saying their members rejected racism and violence. The gathering was justified as a protest against "ethnic gangs" with blame for the rioting and violence largely placed on alcohol and the agitation of far-right groups. During a press conference along with the Comanchero MC (which has a large number of Middle Eastern members), an apology from the Maroubra "Bra Boys" was also issued to leaders of the Islamic community. Apologies from several others involved were also issued to Sydney's Lebanese community, though the earlier "protest" part of the day was still defended.

Writing a year after the riots, novelist Hsu-Ming Teo of Macquarie University was worried that Australian multiculturalism was being eroded, stating that multiculturalism was one of Australia's defining features that allowed it to broker differences with its geographical neighbours, and that it was almost unique in its ethnic and cultural origins. She suggested that in recent years multiculturalism had begun to be derided with conservative politicians calling for one homogeneous, non-diverse culture, citing amongst others the "popularity and success" of Pauline Hanson and her One Nation Party.

In 2008, Australian portrait photographer Michel Lawrence published All of Us, a book containing photographs of people born in 200 other countries, but who were now living in Australia. Lawrence said the All of Us project was wholly inspired by the Cronulla riots. "You watch this stuff on TV and you wonder why people are doing this – this is no way for a multicultural society to behave", said Lawrence.

=== Government responses ===
The New South Wales parliament convened on 15 December to pass laws giving police new powers including: the ability to seize cars and mobile phones for up to seven days, close licensed premises and prohibit bringing alcohol into lockdown zones. A new offence of "assault during a public disorder" was also introduced and both rioting and affray had their minimum sentences increased. New South Wales Premier Morris Iemma called the attacks "disgusting, cowardly behaviour" and condemned the rioters. He also called on the community leaders to use "their influence to get the hot heads to cool it".

New South Wales Police Commissioner Ken Moroney called the riots "absolutely totally un-Australian", saying that "I saw, in my 40 years of police service, some of the most disgraceful behaviour and conduct by adults that I'd ever seen." New South Wales Opposition leader Peter Debnam called it "a real disgrace" and called for a tougher police response. Australian Prime Minister John Howard condemned the violence describing it as "sickening and deplorable" but denied any racial undertones, saying the events were primarily an issue of law and order — a view echoed by the Treasurer Peter Costello, who described the Sydney riots as "an example of hoodlums who got out of control". Federal opposition leader Kim Beazley described the attacks as "simply criminal behaviour, that's all there is to it".

One Nation NSW figure David Oldfield blamed the riots on the "failed social policy of multiculturalism" and called for an alternative assimilationist approach that highlights "the principles of unity given by a single national identity".

=== Economic impacts ===
Look at what a beautiful day it is. The weekend before Christmas. Over there should be absolutely packed, but there's just a sea of empty tables.

— Daryl Peat, a restaurant and bar owner in Terrigal on the New South Wales Central Coast

Many of the small businesses in and around Terrigal on the New South Wales Central Coast (two hours north of Cronulla) reported that a police lockdown of the beach caused business to drop to 10% of normal levels on a Saturday, with only 25% of Christmas shopping crowds turning up on the Sunday. Tourism and hospitality workers in the area were laid off or had their hours cut. The New South Wales state government announced a A$250,000 tourism campaign after authorities in Great Britain, Canada and Indonesia issued travel warnings to their citizens.

== Later decades ==
=== Tenth anniversary ===
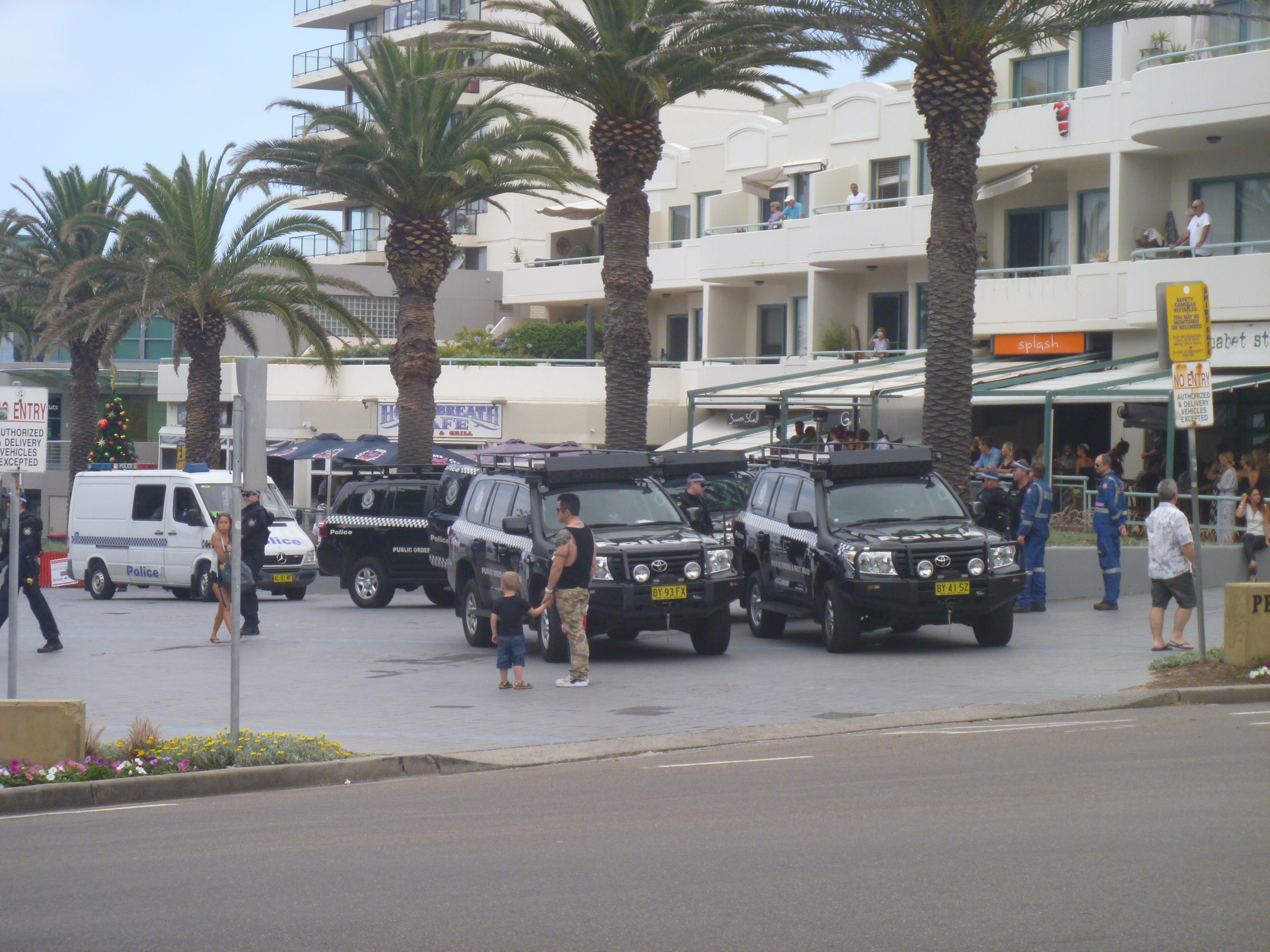
Police presence at Peryman Square, Cronulla. 12 December 2015

The Party for Freedom (PFF) planned to mark the tenth anniversary of the events with a rally on Saturday, 12 December 2015. PFF chairman Nicholas Folkes was refused permission in the Supreme Court of New South Wales "on the grounds it would stir up racial hatred". In a separate case, the Federal Court of Australia ruled that no other person or groups could commemorate the anniversary. The Federal ruling was in response to a joint application by Jamal Rifi, a prominent member of the Lebanese Muslim community in Australia, and the Sutherland Shire Council who applied for the Federal Court ruling.

In place of the rally a "halal-free" barbecue, attended by about 50, was held on Don Lucas Reserve near Wanda Beach. A larger number of counter protesters in "the hundreds", including Antifa members, were also present. A heavy police presence included the riot squad, mounted police and helicopter, and the two groups were mostly kept apart. Two anti-racism protesters were arrested. The majority of the anti-racism protesters were escorted by police to Cronulla Railway station and onto trains headed towards the city of Sydney. They were accompanied by riot police.

=== Twenty years later ===
The Bondi shooting exacerbated older ethnic and religious tensions in the community. In the immediate aftermath of the attack there was a threat of escalating violence with incitement circulated online focused on Cronulla, a beach near Bondi that was the epicentre of a previous anti-Arab and anti-Muslim race riot in 2005. In response to this, public assemblies were prohibited across the entire Sydney metro area for 14 days. The targets of the calls for violent retaliation were the "Middle Eastern" and broader locally-described "wog" ethnic groups, referring to Lebanese Australians and other Eastern Mediterranean ethnic groups, the target of the previous mob violence. The previous race riots, 20 years earlier, were triggered by local violent crimes committed by individual Lebanese Australian men in Sydney, in the context of tensions already heightened by terrorist attacks in Bali in 2002 targeting Australian tourists, and the September 11 attacks in 2001. A 20-year-old man appeared in court on charges of "using a carriage service to menace, harass, offend, and publicly threaten violence on grounds of race or religion", for attempting to incite retaliatory mob violence in response to the Bondi shooting. The article headline in The Tenterfield Star called him a "Muslim hater". He was denied bail.

== Film ==
The 2016 film Down Under is set in the aftermath of the riots.

== See also ==
- Far-right politics in Australia
  - Reclaim Australia
  - March for Australia
- List of riots
- Racial violence in Australia
