= Lambing Flat riots =

Series of violent anti-Chinese demonstrations in Australia

Coordinates: 34°18′57.04″S 148°17′31.86″E

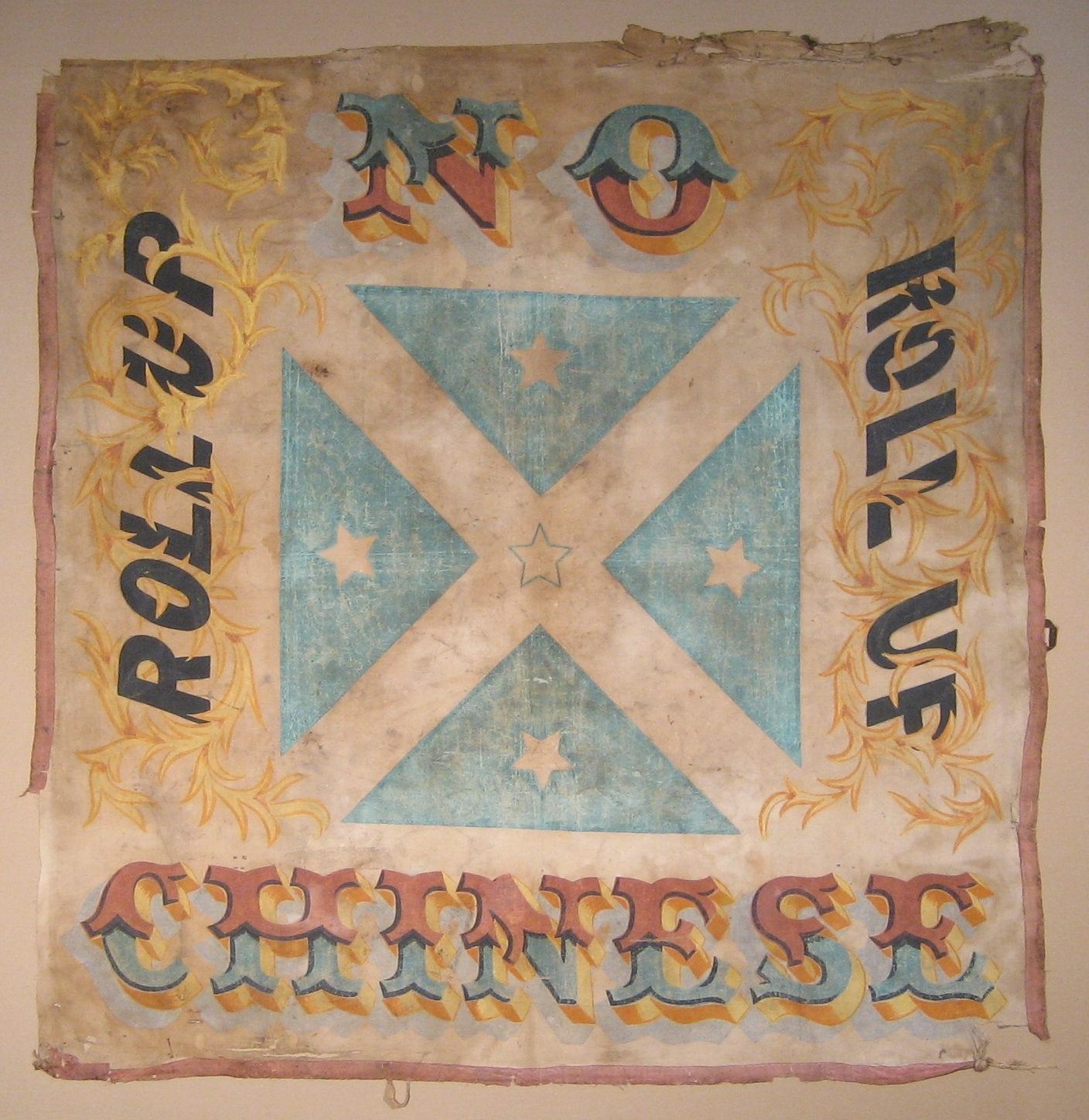
The Roll Up Banner with which a mob of 2,000–3,000 men rallied and attacked Chinese miners at Lambing Flat in June 1861. The banner is displayed in Lambing Flat, now known as Young.

The Lambing Flat riots flag.

The Lambing Flat riots banner flag.

The Lambing Flat riots were a series of violent anti-Chinese demonstrations that took place in the Burrangong region, in New South Wales, Australia. They occurred on the goldfields at Spring Creek, Stoney Creek, Back Creek, Wombat, Blackguard Gully, Tipperary Gully, and Lambing Flat.

== Antipathy on the Goldfields ==
Events in the Australian goldfields in the 1850s led to hostility toward Chinese miners on the part of many Europeans, which was to affect many aspects of European-Chinese relations in Australia for the next century. Some of the sources of conflict between European and Chinese miners arose from the nature of the industry they were engaged in. Most gold mining in the early years was alluvial mining, where the gold was in small particles mixed with dirt, gravel and clay close to the surface of the ground, or buried in the beds of old watercourses or "leads". Extracting the gold took no great skill, but it was hard work, and generally speaking, the more work, the more gold the miner won. Europeans tended to work alone or in small groups, concentrating on rich patches of ground, and frequently abandoning a reasonably rich claim to take up another one rumoured to be richer. Very few miners became wealthy; the reality of the diggings was that relatively few miners found even enough gold to earn them a living.

The Chinese generally worked in large organised groups, covering the entire ground's surface, so that if there was any gold there, the Chinese miners usually found it. They lived communally and frugally, and could subsist on a much lower return than Europeans. The rural background of most of the Chinese diggers suited them very well to life as alluvial goldminers: they were used to long hours of hard outdoor work as a member of a disciplined team, accustomed to simple sleeping quarters and basic food, and were satisfied with a much smaller return of gold than the majority of Europeans.

Tension between the two groups first surfaced as petty complaints: Europeans claimed that the Chinese muddied the water holes, they worked on the Sabbath, they were thieves, they had insanitary habits, they accepted low wages and would drive down the value of labour. But because the Chinese were distinctive in appearance, language and dress, they became classic targets for xenophobia, and surly resentment became systematic hatred.

These pressures gave rise to several violent protests against government policies across Victoria and New South Wales in the late 1850s and early 1860s. The first anti-Chinese demonstration occurred in Bendigo in July 1854. Some of these incidents took the form of outright attempts at excluding the Chinese from a goldfield, or a portion of it. Disputes between European and Chinese miners flared into brawls at Daylesford and Castlemaine. A party of Chinese en route to the Victorian diggings from Robe discovered a new goldfield at Ararat, and were driven off their find by Europeans. Similar events occurred in New South Wales, which was just feeling the impact of significant Chinese immigration. European miners drove Chinese off the diggings at Rocky River in New England (Australia) in 1856. Serious confrontations followed at Adelong in 1857 and Tambaroora in 1858. In Victoria the Buckland River goldfield was the scene of repeated incidents, culminating in a major riot in July 1857.

== The Burrangong Affair ==
The most notorious of these incidents, and the one which has generated more folklore than any other, was the so-called Lambing Flat Riot, actually a drawn-out series of incidents on the Burrangong Goldfield in New South Wales between November 1860 and September 1861. Several place names are sometimes used interchangeably when describing these events. Burrangong was the name of the gazetted goldfield, and its principal settlement later became the modern town of Young. Lambing Flat, the name which has attached itself most persistently to the events, was a horse paddock where one of the most violent incidents took place.

Another important aspect of the story is the political events that were going on in Sydney, for the Burrangong affair was played out against the background of a contentious debate in the New South Wales Parliament over legislation to restrict Chinese immigration. Chinese numbers on the New South Wales goldfields had been relatively small, but were rising in the wake of restrictions imposed in Victoria. Restrictive legislation had also been proposed in New South Wales as early as 1858 in the wake of Victorian and South Australian laws, but the Premier, Charles Cowper, found his own party divided on the issue and the Bill failed. Then in 1860 the Chinese and British governments signed the Convention of Peking, a diplomatic agreement that subjects of the Chinese and British Empires would have reciprocal rights under their respective countries' laws. As the Australian colonies enacted British laws, it raised the question of whether New South Wales could legally exclude citizens of the Chinese Empire. A new Chinese Immigration Regulation Bill was being drafted for debate in Parliament while the first gold miners were arriving at Burrangong.

The events at Burrangong were well-recorded at the time, and have been analysed by a number of historians in recent decades. The Burrangong affair was arguably the most serious civil disorder that has ever happened in Australia, involving more people and lasting much longer than the Eureka rebellion at Ballarat six years earlier.

Trouble began late in 1860 with the formation of a Miners Protective League, followed by roll-ups (mass meetings) of European diggers evicting Chinese miners from sections of the field. These events involved the quasi-legal posting of notices to quit, and were carried out ceremonially, with a brass band leading the marchers. There was little violence at first. Most of the Chinese moved to new diggings nearby, and some returned soon afterward. This pattern of behaviour was to be repeated on several occasions over the next eight months; there seemed to be an understanding from early in the Burrangong events that the Chinese would be tolerated if they remained in certain areas of the goldfield.

== The Lambing Flat riots ==
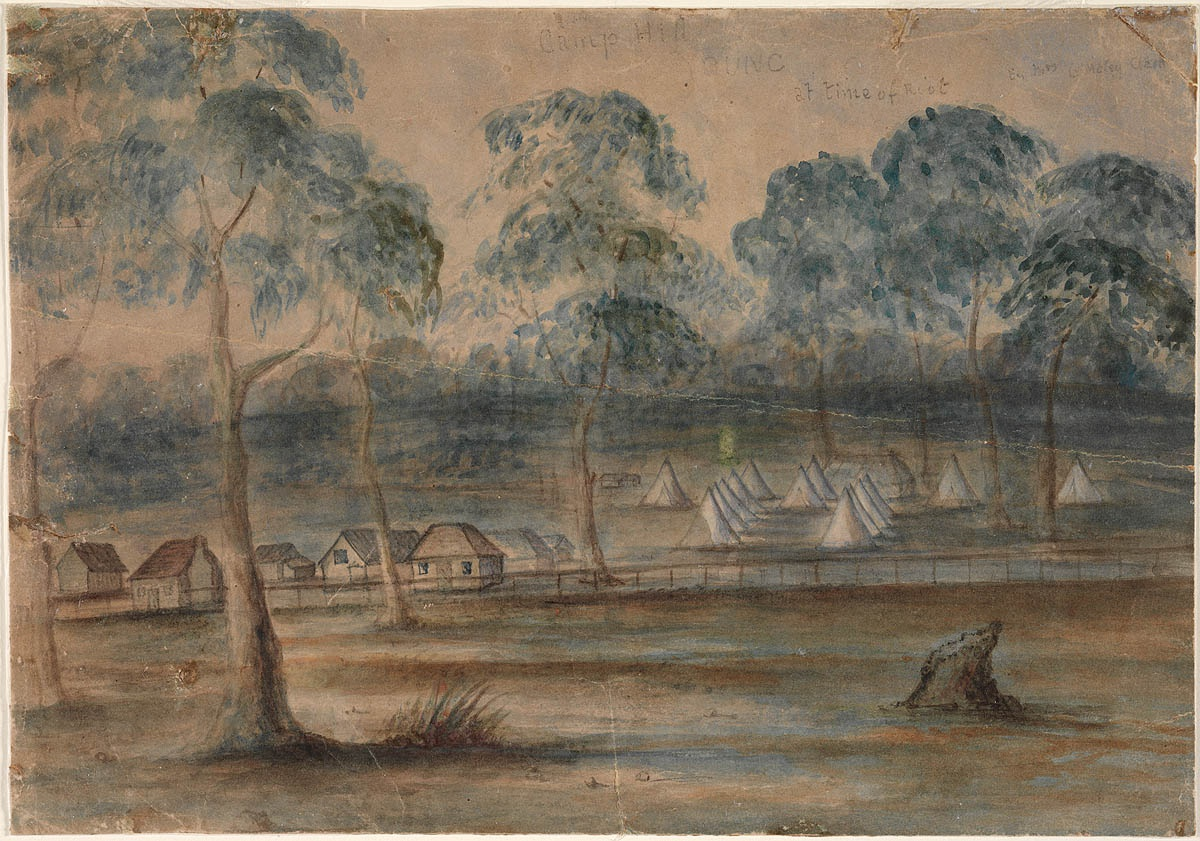
Camp Hill (Lambing Flat) at time of the riots, 1860–61. Now the town of Young, New South Wales

In ten months of unrest at Burrangong, the most infamous riot on the gold fields occurred on the night of 30 June 1861 when a mob of between 2,000 and 3,000 European, North American and Australian-born gold miners attacked about 2,000 Chinese miners and drove the Chinese off the Lambing Flat, and then moved on to the Back Creek diggings, where 150–200 Chinese were encamped, they went about destroying tents and looting possessions. Many of the Chinese were cruelly beaten, but no one was killed. About 1,000 Chinese abandoned the field and set up camp near Roberts' homestead at Currowang sheep station, 20 km away. There were two triggers for the violence: in Sydney the Legislative Council rejected the anti-Chinese bill, and a false rumour swept the goldfield that a new group of 1,500 Chinese were on the road to Burrangong. The police arrived in the days that followed, identified the leaders of the riot, and three were arrested two weeks later. The mob's reaction was an armed attack on the police camp by about a thousand miners on the night of 14 July, which the police broke up with gunfire and mounted sabre charges, leaving one rioter, William Lupton, dead and many wounded.

The police briefly abandoned the field, but then a detachment of 280 soldiers, sailors and police reinforcements arrived from Sydney and stayed for a year. Some of the remaining Chinese miners were reinstated on segregated diggings, the ringleaders of the riots were tried and two were gaoled. At the end of the affair, Burrangong was quiet and some Chinese miners were still there.

A number of Chinese miners petitioned the NSW Government for compensation due to their losses in the riots. However it is doubtful if any compensations was actually paid.

=== The Lambing Flat banner ===
A banner, painted on a tent-flap in 1861, is now on display at the Lambing Flat museum in Young, New South Wales. Bearing a Southern Cross superimposed over a Flag of Scotland's. Andrew's Cross with the inscription, 'Roll Up – No Chinese', the banner has been claimed by some as a variant of the Eureka Flag. It served as an advertisement for a public meeting that presaged the infamous Lambing Flat riots later that year. Painted by a Scottish migrant, it is a testimony to the transfer of cultural practices and values through migration. Though it has been claimed to be an example of Chartist art, the Chartist movement was not racial in nature and sought only to protect the poor from the rich. Nevertheless, along with the Eureka Flag it is a rare example of an historic Australian banner designed to rally support to a cause.

== See also ==
- Buckland Riot, 1857
- White Australia policy
- Chinese massacre of 1871 in United States
- San Francisco riot of 1877 in United States
- Rock Springs massacre, 1885 in United States
- Attack on Squak Valley Chinese laborers, 1885 in United States
- Tacoma riot of 1885 in United States
- Seattle riot of 1886 in United States
- Hells Canyon massacre, 1887 in United States
- Torreón massacre, 1911 in Mexico
- Atlanta spa shootings, 2021 in United States
- The Lambing Flat – a historical fiction novel by Nerida Newton set in and around Young at the time of the Lambing Flat riots
