= Blackguard Gully =

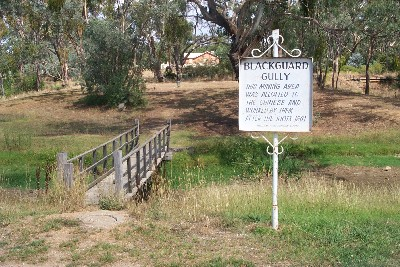
- Blackguard Gully Reserve and sign

- Location within New South Wales Location within Australia
- 34°19′08″S 148°18′36″E
- Location: Whiteman Avenue, Young, Hilltops Council, New South Wales, Australia

History
- Built: 1860–1861

Site notes
- Owner: Hilltops Council

New South Wales Heritage Register
- Official name: Blackguard Gully; Lambing Flat gold fields; Burrangong goldfields
- Type: State heritage (archaeological-terrestrial)
- Designated: 13 March 2009
- Reference no.: 1775
- Type: Massacre/battle site
- Category: Exploration, Survey and Events

Blackguard Gully is a heritage-listed former Chinese mining camp and now reserve at Whiteman Avenue, Young, New South Wales, Australia. It was part of the Lambing Flat or Burragorang goldfields, and was a primary location of the anti-Chinese Lambing Flat riots of 1861. The property is owned by the Hilltops Council (formerly the Young Shire Council). It was added to the New South Wales State Heritage Register on 13 March 2009.

== History ==
The land on which Young is located formed part of the lands over which the indigenous Wiradjuri people once wandered. The area lacked a reliable permanent water supply and the Wiradjuri didn't regularly camp in the region, except during prolific seasons or when travelling between areas around the Lachlan and Murrumbidgee rivers.

In 1826 James White moved to the area now known as Young and settled at Burrangong Station. The site where Young now stands was a well-sheltered valley with a good water source. White setup sheep yards and an area was reserved for lambing ewes, thus the name "Lambing Flat". In March 1860 White's nephew, Dennis Rogan, and Alexander the Yankee found gold along the creek.

=== Riots ===
Within six months roughly 1200 Europeans and 500 Chinese were working in the area. The large influx of miners from all parts of the world saw the establishment of Young as a township. The poor returns experienced by many European miners led to increasing resentment of the Chinese. On 13 November 1860 five hundred Chinese were forced out of their camp, their tents burnt and their sites/titles taken over.

On 12 December 1860 the miners tried to drive off the Chinese, but were reported to have killed two in the action of cutting off their pigtails, detaching part of their scalps in doing so. Sydney was disturbed. The Sydney Morning Herald asserted that the Government should foresee and provide against such emergencies. International relations between the British and Chinese Governments threatened to become strained. Captain Zouch, commandant of the Southern Police Patrol, was rushed to the diggings with a contingent of troopers. Captain Zouch reported that he could find no trace of any Chinese said to have been injured. Although their arrival brought the police force to eight mounted police and two detectives, riots broke afresh on the last Friday in January 1861 when the Europeans assembled and with threat of arms drove off the Chinese and threatened the police barracks if the police interfered. The European miners formed up in marching order and headed by a banner and a band for music they marched to Blackguard Gully and drove off some 200 Chinese.

Following this march, Captain Zouch, Chief Commissioner Cloete, Commissioner Dickson and Police Inspector Singleton accompanied with six foot police arrested 11 men who they placed in the lockup charged with setting fire to the tents of the Chinese. Scouts brought in men from Stoney Creek until 4000 assembled and demanded the release of the prisoners. The next morning the prisoners appeared before the court, the evidence was said to be unsatisfactory, and the 11 men were cautioned and discharged. This was followed by European shop owners driving off their Chinese servants. The police kept the Chinese out of town for fear of further violence.

By February 1861 new finds meant that there were over 12,000 Europeans and 2000 Chinese working on the goldfields. On 25 February 1861 the New South Wales Government dispatched a contingent of troopers consisting of cavalry, 20 mounted police escort for artillery with three 12 pounder field guns and 130 men of the 12th Regiment of Foot under Captain Atkinson. The troops arrived on 11 May 1861 and set up quarters on Camp Hill, erecting buildings and digging trenches and fortifications at the corner of Campbell and Berthong Streets from which their guns were trained over the town.

On 2 March 1861 Premier Charles Cowper arrived in Young. Following his visit, Chinese miners on the Burrangong goldfields were restricted to Blackguard Gully. This was due to the Legislative Council not passing Cowper's laws to protect Chinese miners. On 31 January 1861 a meeting of miners founded the Miners' Protective League; its aims were the expulsion of the Chinese. The League's leaders claimed that the Chinese wasted water which was very precious on the field and cost sixpence per bucket when the creek was dry. The leaders offered an address to the Premier but permission was refused after he had examined its contents. The Premier moved freely without escort among the miners, addressing meetings but refused to recognise their leaders. He said that his Government favoured restriction of the Chinese, but affirmed they must not be injured in person or property. He explained that the Government was bound both by the decisions of the Legislative Council and Britain's treaty with China which admitted Chinese to British territories "with secured privileges".

The troopers were a familiar sight on the dusty streets and roads of Lambing Flat. However, without warning, the artillery left for Sydney on 24 May 1861, and newspapers reported of fears of more riots. The Chinese miners started to return to the goldfields. In mid-June a report was issued in Sydney stating 1500 Chinese were bound for the Burrangong goldfields, which again stirred up the European miners. With no troops stationed on Lambing Flat, trouble increased.

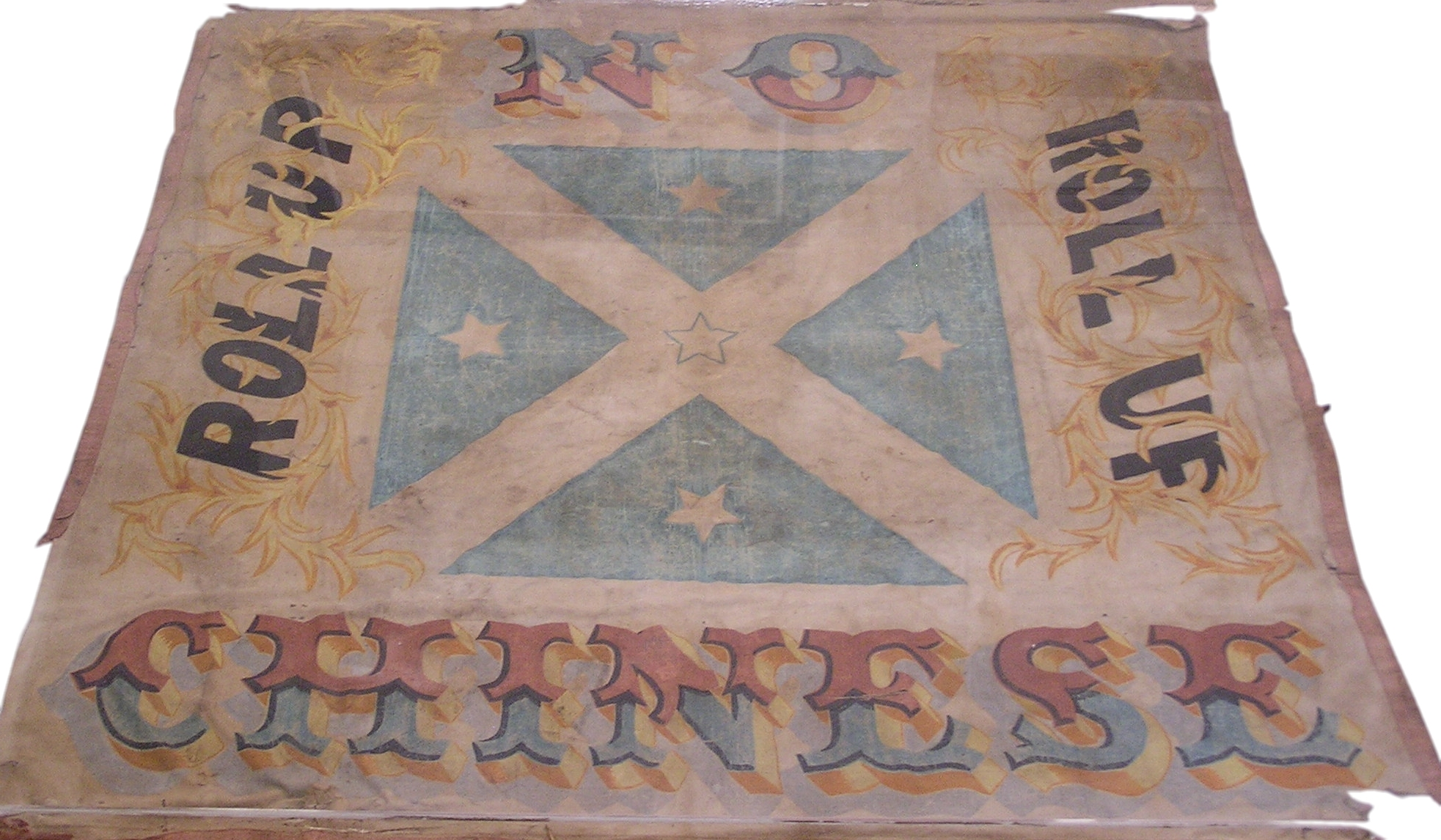
The "Roll-Up" Banner

On 30 June 1861 there was a general call among the European miner to band together and expel the Chinese from the goldfields. Some 3000 men assembled at Allandale at Tipperary Gully and marched to Blackguard Gully carrying a flag with a white cross on a blue background, five stars and the words "Roll-up, Roll-up, No Chinese" worked around the border. At Blackguard Gully and later at Back Creek they burned the tents and possessions of the Chinese, slashed off pigtails and forced the Chinese miners out of their encampment. The local newspaper "The Miner" reported that:

"Men or rather monsters on horseback armed with bludgeons and whips with field-like fury cutting or rather sawing them [pigtails] off. The atrocities would fill a volume".

=== Aftermath ===
The Chinese took refuge in the camp of the Gold Commissioner. They later made 1568 claims totalling A£40,623 92shillings 6d for their losses, but he Government accepted only 706 claims for A£4,240. Following the Lambing Flat riots in 1861, several public meetings were held at Araluen. The aim of the meetings was to petition the government against allowing Chinese miners to work on goldfields on Crown lands. At one meeting the local member of the Legislative Assembly, Dr Wilson, condemned the actions of European miners at the Lambing Flat riots. In addition to public meetings additional troops arrived at Lambing Flat on 31 July after two weeks marching. Several men were arrested and trialled, and all but one was acquitted due to lack of evidence.

The Official Riot Act was read on miners on 14 July 1861. It was the only official reading in New South Wales history. The area known as "Burrangong Goldfields" covered an area of 20 miles (32 km) by 10 miles (16.5 km). It was regarded as the richest and most populous in the state with 470,000 ounces of gold sent by escort from the fields.

The violence of these riots resulted in the government responding to community concern by passing a Chinese Immigration Restriction Act and at an Intercolonial Conference held in 1880 and 1881 uniform restrictive immigration laws were adopted.

In 1861 Lambing Flat had its name changed to Young, in honour of Sir John Young, at the time the Governor of New South Wales. With the exhaustion of the gold fields the majority of miners moved on and were replaced by farmers and commercial businesses. The small number of Chinese migrants who stayed in Young after the gold rush contributed to these new activities.

Young cherishes its unique and colourful history today. During the Lambing Flat Festival in April there is a re-enactment of the "Roll Up" and reading of the Riot Act. A painting of the Lambing Flat miners waving the "Roll Up" flag, along with the flag itself and other mining artefacts, are on display at the Lambing Flat Folk Museum.

== Description ==
Blackguard Gully lies on either side of the creek running west/east along Victoria Gully Creek and is used as a reserve. In the early twenty-first century the creek is crossed by a simple wooden bridge and the reserve has open grassland and trees. A sign in the reserve reads:

"BLACKGUARD GULLY. THIS MINING AREA WAS ALLOTED TO THE CHINESE AND WORKED BY THEM AFTER THE RIOTS 1861."

=== Condition ===
As at 20 November 2006, there had been no apparent attempt to preserve any indicators of the Chinese occupation of the site. Archaeological potential was assessed as low due to the extensive mine workings that cover the site, but some archaeological deposits may be located in some of the less disturbed areas located towards the edges of the site.

The preservation of Blackguard Gully as a reserve has meant it is possible to gain an understanding of the use of this site as a Chinese camp, its relation to the European camp at Tipperary and the distance covered by those who marched on 30 June 1861.

== Heritage listing ==
Blackguard Gully is of historical significance as the site of one of the worst riots against Chinese miners in Australian history. In late 1860 and early 1861 there were several attacks on Chinese miners. On 30 June 1861 some 3000 Europeans marched against Chinese miners on Lambing Flat goldfields, attacking their two main camps at Blackguard Gully and Back Creek. They carried a flag with the words "Roll-up Roll-up No Chinese", which is now on display in the Lambing Flat Folk Museum. The riot led to the passing of legislation to restrict access to goldfields to aliens and to refuse miners' rights to aliens. The violence of these riots resulted in the government responding to community concern by passing a Chinese Immigration Restriction Act and at an Intercolonial Conference held in 1880 and 1881 uniform restrictive immigration laws were adopted. The march of the Europeans through the town on 30 June 1861 and the later declaration of the Riot Act were of immense significance to the history of the town of Young. In 1861 Lambing Flat had its name changed to Young.

Blackguard Gully is associated with the Chinese who camped in the area in the early 1860s and who mined for gold at Lambing Flat. The events of the time are also remembered by the town of Young today with Lambing Flat Festival in April, which includes a re-enactment of the "Roll Up" and reading of the Riot Act.

It has potential to yield archaeological information on the use of the site in the 1860s and beyond. Although many gold fields experienced protests against the Chinese, Lambing Flat was unique in the level of organisation of the riots, the purpose-made flag that was carried, and the fact that the site of the riot survives as a public space (Blackguard Gully).

Blackguard Gully was listed on the New South Wales State Heritage Register on 13 March 2009 having satisfied the following criteria.

The place is important in demonstrating the course, or pattern, of cultural or natural history in New South Wales.

Blackguard Gully is of State historical significance as the site of one of the worst riots against Chinese miners in Australian history.

The place has a strong or special association with a person, or group of persons, of importance of cultural or natural history of New South Wales's history.

Blackguard Gully is of State significance for its association with the Chinese who camped in the area in the early 1860s and who mined for gold at Lambing Flat. The events of the time are also remembered by the town of Young today with Lambing Flat Festival in April, which includes a re-enactment of the "Roll Up" and reading of the Riot Act.

The place has a strong or special association with a particular community or cultural group in New South Wales for social, cultural or spiritual reasons.

Blackguard Gully is of State cultural significance to the people of Young and NSW as the site of some of the worst riots in Australia. The march of the miners through the town on 30 June 1861 and the later declaration of the Riot Act were of immense significance to the subsequent history of the town.

The place has potential to yield information that will contribute to an understanding of the cultural or natural history of New South Wales.

It has some potential to yield archaeological information on the use of the site in the 1860s and beyond.

The place possesses uncommon, rare or endangered aspects of the cultural or natural history of New South Wales.

It has potential to yield archaeological information on the use of the site in the 1860s and beyond. Although many gold fields experienced protests against the Chinese, Lambing Flat was unique in the level of organisation of the riots, the purpose made flag that was carried, and the fact that the site of the riot survives as a public space (Blackguard Gully).

The place is important in demonstrating the principal characteristics of a class of cultural or natural places/environments in New South Wales.

Blackguard Gully is a representative mining site of the 1860s and several following decades in Australia.

== See also ==
- New South Wales gold rush
