= Far-right terrorism in Australia =

Terrorism in Australia motivated by far-right ideologies

Far-right terrorism in Australia refers to far-right-ideologically influenced terrorism on Australian soil. Far-right extremist groups have existed in Australia since the early 20th century, however the intensity of terrorist activities have oscillated until the present time. A surge of neo-Nazism based terrorism occurred in Australia during the 1960s and the 1970s, carried out primarily by members of the Ustaše organisation. However in the 21st century, the White genocide conspiracy theory, and after effects of the COVID-19 pandemic have fuelled far-right terrorist threats in Australia. The Australian Security Intelligence Organisation (ASIO), the Australian Federal Police (AFP) and state police departments are responsible for responding to far-right terrorist threats in Australia.

== Definitions ==
=== Terrorism ===
Schmid's 2011 Revised Academic Consensus Definition of Terrorism was agreed after three rounds of consultations among experts in the field. The first of 12 points in his definition states:

1. Terrorism refers, on the one hand, to a doctrine about the presumed effectiveness of a special form or tactic of fear-generating, coercive political violence and, on the other hand, to a conspiratorial practice of calculated, demonstrative, direct violent action without legal or moral restraints, targeting mainly civilians and non-combatants, performed for its propagandistic and psychological effects on various audiences and conflict parties;...

Researcher Miroslav Mares noted "the line between street violence perpetrated by subcultural networks can quickly blur into terrorist violence".

=== Right-wing extremism ===
Right-wing extremism is a broad term used to encompass a variety of ideologies, including fascism, national socialism (Nazism), white supremacy, the common components of which are authoritarianism, anti-democracy and nationalism.

In Australia, right-wing extremists often believe that there is a threat to some aspect of their existence or society, and then attribute the cause as a particular target group, such as an ethnic community or those who adhere to a different, usually left-wing ideology. They overexaggerate and spread feelings of danger, blaming the target group, and think that the only way to rid society of the danger is to remove the threat, often by violent means.

== History ==
=== 20th century ===
Far-right violent extremist groups have existed in Australia since the early 20th century, but their activities and impact has been minimal. After the First World War, there was an ex-soldiers' fascist movement in New South Wales known as the New Guard, a short-lived paramilitary organisation, which emerged from the Sydney-based Old Guard in 1931, during the Great Depression, and regarded by some as the most successful fascist organisation in Australian history. The White Army, or League of National Security (LNS), formed in Victoria around 1931 and attracted some former members of the New Guard, but the far right only became a stronger force in the late 1930s, with the Australia First Movement, who believed in a white Australia. Alexander Rud Mills was a vocal supporter, who also believed in "a racial interpretation of Odinism". In 1941, plans to assassinate prominent Australians and to sabotage sites in Australia were discovered in the possession of Western Australian members.

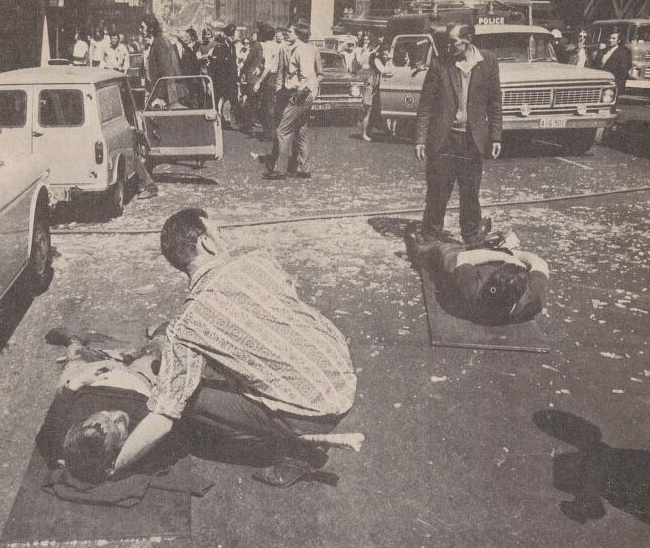
Aftermath of the 1972 George St bombings in Sydney, allegedly carried out by the Ustaše

After World War II, the Australian League of Rights (a group still in existence), led by Eric Butler, became active. Butler believed in the existence of a "Zionist Occupation Government", which controlled governments across the world, including that of Nazi Germany. This group tried to infiltrate mainstream political parties. Post-war immigration to Australia in the 1950s introduced far-right sympathisers from Europe into Australia, in particular sympathisers of the Ustaše, a Croatian fascist and ultranationalist organization responsible for partaking in the Holocaust and Genocide of Serbs in the Independent State of Croatia. From 1963–1973, the Ustaše carried out fifteen attacks and inspired dozens more as part of a terrorism campaign of bombings and assassination attempts across Australia.

In the 1960s came the Australian National Socialist Party (re-constituted as the National Socialist Party of Australia in 1968), and from the late 1970s, ASIO was monitoring groups such as the Safari 8, the Legion of the Frontiersmen of the Commonwealth, and the Australian Youth Coalition, but they did not last long. In the 1970s and early 1980s the National Front of Australia and the Australian National Alliance emerged, and from the early 1980s, National Action.

Following a lull in activity, violence by the far-right in Australia surged in the 1980s. National Action members carried out attacks in Sydney, including a drive-by shooting. In 1984, the Australian Nationalist Movement (ANM) broke away from National Action, considering National Action not sufficiently antisemitic and embracing of neo-Nazism, and ANM members started a campaign which included violent assaults and fire-bombings. Australia "[did not experience] anything like the levels of right-wing extremism and violence that impacted Europe and North America in the 1990s" (2005), but some networks of subcultures, and the "skinhead" counterculture, including groups like the Southern Cross Hammerskins, Combat 18, Blood & Honour, and the Women of the Southern Legion harboured ideologies centred on racial identity.

=== 21st century ===
Southern Cross Hammerskins, Combat 18, and Blood & Honour Australia continued to be active in Australia, and new ones have been founded since 2000.

Right-wing extremism began to increase around the world from around 2009, partly in response to jihadism (militant movements rooted in political Islam or Islamism and seen as an existential threat by some), but more often related to perceived threats to white culture posed by immigration. In this climate, Australian chapters of internationally based groups were founded, such as the Australian Defence League (originally an offshoot of the English Defence League) and Right Wing Resistance (from New Zealand).

Since around 2015 (when far-right groups stoked protests against the building of a mosque in Bendigo), the threat from far-right violent extremist groups has been increasing. Around 30–40% of ASIO's counter-terrorism work involved far-right individuals and groups in late 2020, an increase of 10–15% on the years before 2016. Although their capabilities are assessed as being on a smaller scale than the far-right extremists in Europe and the US, the ideologies are similar. Worldwide, individuals enable and encourage each other in online networks. White extremist attacks in the US, UK and Europe inspired the Christchurch shooter, Brenton Tarrant, and his actions on 15 March 2019 have inspired others around the world.

Founder of the Proud Boys, Gavin McInnes was refused a visa to visit Australia in November 2018.

==== 2020s ====
Australian right-wing extremists celebrated the 2021 United States Capitol attack in Washington, D.C., and experts warned of an increased threat of violence by white supremacists since the onset of the COVID-19 pandemic. Two government backbenchers, Craig Kelly and George Christensen, had aired conspiracy theories relating to the Capitol attack on social media, and the refusal of Prime Minister Scott Morrison to reprimand them was seen as "dangerous" by one expert on violent extremism.

== Current situation ==
In its 2019–2020 annual report, ASIO rates Australia's national terrorism threat level as "probable", based on the assessment of credible intelligence. It states that "extremists such as neo-Nazis represent a serious, increasing and evolving threat to security. The 2019 Christchurch attack continues to be drawn on for inspiration by right-wing extremists worldwide", and says that these groups are attracting younger adherents of their ideologies. The extremists exploit the social and economic disruption brought about by the COVID-19 pandemic in Australia to engage with others online. It says that 2020 "saw an increased growth in ASIO investigations related to extreme right-wing groups, individuals and emerging ideologies", with far-right extremist individuals comprising "around a third of all ASIO counter-terrorism investigative subjects". During this time too, for the second time, authorities disrupted planned terrorism in Australia linked to an individual with an extreme right-wing ideology.

A report published in March 2021, prepared jointly by the Centre for the Analysis of the Radical Right (CARR) in the UK and Hedayah, a research group based in the United Arab Emirates, and compiled with the policy assistance of the Australian Department of Home Affairs, says: "Australian chapters of more fringe neo-Nazi cells [have been] actively engaged in campaigns of radical right terror and violence". It also reported that since the Christchurch attack, extremist groups have "become more explicitly anti-Semitic, aggressively racist and white supremacist". Of the various groups named in the report, four have been proscribed in other countries, but not in Australia: Combat 18, which linked to the shooting of mosque in Perth in 2011 (proscribed in Canada, 2019; Germany, 2020), Blood and Honour (Canada, 2019), Generation Identity (France, 2021) and the Proud Boys (Canada, 2021). One of the researchers later named Antipodean Resistance and the National Socialist Network as local groups of concern. The latter group has been photographed in disguise at The Grampians, near Canberra and in Adelaide.

=== Countering extremism ===
Joint Counter Terrorism Teams are run collaboratively by the AFP, state and territory police forces and ASIO. The AFP leads the National Disruption Group, which works with Australian communities and a number of other government agencies "to combat violent extremism and the radicalisation of Australians".

Various agencies have reported not paying enough attention to right-wing extremism before the Christchurch massacre. The deputy commissioner of Victoria Police Ross Guenther told a March 2021 police briefing that they had been focusing on Islamist extremism owing to the threats by supporters of Islamic State in Australia, and that the Christchurch terrorist had been able to slip under the radar. Since then, the national and state agencies have been more focused on far-right extremism, with the greatest threat posed by individuals rather than groups.

The Parliamentary Joint Committee on Intelligence and Security was due to report to the Minister for Home Affairs in April 2021 from its "Inquiry into extremist movements and radicalism in Australia", which lapsed when the membership of the Parliamentary Joint Committee on Intelligence and Security (PJCIS) ceased to exist at the dissolution of the House of Representatives on Monday 11 April 2022. There have been calls to follow the example of Australia's other partners in the Five Eyes security collaboration and proscribe more of the far-right extremist groups.

In March 2021 the first far-right extremist group was added to the list of proscribed terrorist groups, this group being the Sonnenkrieg Division, bringing the total to 27.

==== Community Action for Preventing Extremism ====
There is as of March 2021 only one significant program to counter the far-right extremist narrative in Australia. This is Community Action for Preventing Extremism, funded by Multicultural NSW, an agency of the New South Wales Government, and run by All Together Now, a not-for-profit organisation that promotes racial equality. The program was established in 2012 and initially called Exit White Power.

== Extremist groups ==
=== Historical ===
==== Australian Nationalist Movement ====
The Australian Nationalist Movement (ANM), later reborn as the Australian Nationalist Worker's Union (ANWU), was a Western Australian neo-Nazi, extreme right-wing group founded and led by Peter Joseph "Jack" van Tongeren. In 1989, Van Tongeren staged a series of racially motivated arson attacks, targeting businesses owned by Asian Australians. He was found guilty of 53 crimes and sentenced to 18 years. After serving 13 years in prison for his crimes, Van Tongeren resumed anti-Asian activities upon his release in 2002. In February 2004 three Chinese restaurants, synagogues and Asian-owned businesses where firebombed, plastered with posters and daubed with swastikas. Five men were arrested for being involved in the attacks. The police also identified a plot to harm WA Attorney-General Jim McGinty and his family. In August 2004, Van Tongeren and his co-accused Matthew Billing faced the courts for the arson attacks. After a medical episode, Van Tongeren was released from jail on the condition that he leave Western Australia.

In 2007 the ANM/ANWU was reported to have been disbanded.

=== Croatian Revolutionary Brotherhood ===
The Croatian Revolutionary Brotherhood (HRB) was an Australian-based Croatian separatist and fascist terrorist organisation. The group was founded by four Croatian emigre, including one former Ustaše officer. From the 1960s, the HRB actively carried out terrorist attacks in both Australia and Yugoslavia, including bombings and assassination attempts, despite knowledge of their actions by ASIO and the Liberal Party of Australia. However by 1972, attacks in Australia largely ceased following an unprecedented intervention by the Australian Labor Party.

=== Active groups ===
==== Antipodean Resistance ====
Antipodean Resistance (AR) is an Australian neo-Nazi group. Formed in October 2016, the group's flag features a swastika. The group's logo features the black sun and Totenkopf (skull head) with an Akubra hat, a laurel wreath and a swastika. Antipodean Resistance promotes and incites hatred and violence, as illustrated in its anti-Jewish and anti-homosexual posters, with graphic images of shooting Jews and homosexuals in the head. One poster called to "Legalise the execution of Jews."

In 2017, it was reported that ASIO, the Australian national security organisation, was monitoring the group, who were "willing to use violence to further their own interests".

Members of the Antipodean Resistance and the Lads Society organised the creation of a new group, the National Socialist Network, in late 2020, and Lads leader Thomas Sewell was one of the organisers of a 2021 group trip to the Grampians in January 2021 (see below).

==== Australian Defence League ====
The Australian Defence League (ADL) is a neo-Nazi street gang. The gang is anti-Islam, and has been involved in making terrorist threats, abusing, stalking and doxxing Muslim Australians. The gang was founded in Sydney in 2009 by recidivist criminal Ralph Cerminara, who has a significant criminal record, as an offshoot of the English Defence League.

==== National Socialist Network ====
The National Socialist Network (NSN) was formed by members of the Lads Society and Antipodean Resistance in late 2020. It is a Melbourne-based neo-Nazi group that claimed in October 2020 to be active in Adelaide, Melbourne, Sydney, Brisbane, Canberra, Perth and several regional cities, but which would not reveal how many members or associates the group has. It has vowed to bring about a "white revolution" and has openly described Indigenous Australians as "subhuman and monkeys". They also engage in antisemitic and other racist behaviour. Its leader is Thomas Sewell, a convicted criminal, an ex-Australian army soldier and neo-Nazi, who is also leader of the Lads Society.

The group helped to organise a group of about 38 young white men who paraded Nazi symbolism and shouted offensive slogans in the Grampians region over the Australia Day weekend in January 2021 (see below).

In March 2021, Victoria Police's counter-terrorism command charged Sewell with affray, recklessly causing injury, and unlawful assault after he allegedly punched a security guard working for the Nine Network in Melbourne's Docklands. The alleged assault took place prior to the broadcast of an A Current Affair report about Sewell's organisation.

On 14 May 2021, Sewell was arrested by counter-terrorism police. He faces a number of charges, including an alleged armed robbery in Taggerty.

==== Sonnenkrieg Division ====
The Sonnenkrieg Division (Sonnenkrieg being German for "sun war") is a neo-Nazi group that is the United Kingdom-based branch of the Atomwaffen Division, and it maintains its links to the Atomwaffen Division by e-mail and online chat room discussion as well as by its use of similar names and its distribution of similar propaganda. It surfaced in December 2018, when it was revealed that members of the group had suggested on the group's Discord server that Prince Harry was a "race traitor" who should be shot for marrying Meghan Markle, who is of mixed race; that police officers should be raped and killed; and that white women who date non-whites should be hanged. Some suspected members are thought to have been involved in a previous neo-Nazi group, the System Resistance Network (one of the aliases of National Action), which was linked to various acts of racial violence and arson in the UK.

On 2 March 2021, Australian Home Affairs Minister Peter Dutton accepted an ASIO recommendation to label the Sonnenkrieg Division a "terrorist organisation", citing their reach into Australia. The group was officially proscribed in Australia on 22 March 2021.

==== The Base ====
The Base is an American neo-Nazi white separatist hate group, which has been actively recruiting in Australia, Canada and other countries. In late 2019 and early 2020, secret recordings were made of some of The Base's recruitment activities. The tapes include their attempts to recruit several Australians, including a 17-year-old teenager and a Western Australian man, Dean Smith, who ran for parliament for Pauline Hanson's One Nation party. The group's founder, Rinaldo Nazzaro, known online as "Roman Wolf" and "Norman Spear", was personally involved in active recruitment. An Australian who went by the name of Volkskrieger was a key person in the recruitment drive, which focused on finding people with legal access to firearms and security licences. The group has been designated a terrorist entity by Canada and Australia.

==== True Blue Crew ====
The True Blue Crew (TBC) is an Australian militant white supremacist group. Members and supporters have been linked to right-wing terrorism and vigilantism, and members have been arrested with weapons and on terrorism-related charges. Experts who have studied the group say it appears to be "committed to violence". The True Blue Crew was formed in 2015 as a splinter group from the anti-Islamic Reclaim Australia group, along with a number of small far-right nationalist groups such as the United Patriots Front.

In December 2019 a member of True Blue Crew, Phillip Galea, was convicted of terrorism charges relating to planned bombings of the Victorian Trades Hall and other left wing organisations in Melbourne.

=== Minor and/or defunct groups ===
==== Right Wing Resistance ====
Right Wing Resistance Australia, an openly white supremacist group affiliated to the Right Wing Resistance group founded in New Zealand, was involved in the Bendigo mosque protests in 2015. An "official blog for the Australian chapter of Right Wing Resistance", headed "Right Wing Resistance Australia" and "RWR Australia", with entries published in August 2011, but with no further activity, still exists as of April 2021. It self-describes as "an organized unified resistance movement against mass immigration, the Dilution of our European Culture and Pride, and the current multicultural agenda created by the current government networks designed to destroy our colonial rights and identity", and cites its function as "to recruit like minded individuals and groups into an organization of active men". The group was thought to be "possibly defunct" in April 2019. It was reported that November to have chapters in Australia, Sweden and Scotland.

The Australia First Party has a photo of three men holding a black flag saying Right Wing Resistance Australia, with "SC" and "14" on the left- and right-hand sides of it. One of these men is Ethan Tilling. He, along with other members of RWR, had gone to Ukraine to join forces fighting alongside the neo-Nazi Azov Battalion during the 2014 pro-Russian unrest in Ukraine.

Phillip Galea, former member of the True Blue Crew who was convicted of plotting terrorist attacks in December 2019, had been a member or supporter of Right Wing Resistance.

==== Others ====
The Patriotic Youth League (a wing of the Australia First Party), was mainly active in the northern suburbs of Sydney and Melbourne, and played a large role in the 2005 Cronulla riots. It disbanded in 2006, but was reincarnated as the Eureka Youth League in 2010.

ASIO monitors the Reclaim Australia group because of its potential for violence.

There is some cross-over between the two groups whose adherents call themselves Freemen on the Land (FOTL) and Sovereign Citizens (among other denominations), whose core beliefs may be broadly defined as "see[ing] the state as a corporation with no authority over free citizens". The New South Wales Police Force identified "sovereign citizens" as a potential terrorist threat in 2015, estimating that there were about 300 sovereign citizens in the state at the time. Sovereign Citizens from the US have undertaken speaking tours to and Australia, with some support among farmers struggling with drought and other hardships. A group called United Rights Australia (U R Australia) has a Facebook presence, and there are other websites promulgating Freemen/Sovereign Citizen ideas.

Other potentially violent groups active in Australia include the Southern Cross Hammerskins and the Crazy Whiteboys (a violent anti-Asian, anti-Semitic and anti-African Australian group founded in 2009 in Melbourne). Far-right groups whose profiles have varied include Identity Australia, the Nationalist Australian Alternative, Australian Traditionalism, and the New National Action.

== Incidents ==
=== Arrests ===
In August 2016, Phillip Galea was charged with several terrorist offences, the first Australian right-wing extremist to be charged with terrorism. Galea had conducted "surveillance" of "left-wing premises" and planned to carry out bombings. Explosive ingredients were found at his home. Galea had links with organisations such as Combat 18 (C18) and the United Patriots Front (UPF). On 5 December 2019, a jury found Galea guilty of planning and preparing a terror attack. He was sentenced to prison for 12 years in November 2020.

In 2017 neo-Nazi Michael James Holt, aged 26, who had threatened to carry out a mass shooting attack and considered Westfield Tuggerah as a target, was convicted after pleading guilty to several firearm manufacture and possession charges. He had manufactured home-made guns, knuckle dusters and slingshots. He was regarded as a loner of low-intelligence with poor mental health who was easily radicalised.

In April 2021, police raided the homes of several men associated with the National Socialist Network in Adelaide. One was arrested for the possession of an improvised explosive device as well as instructions for manufacturing explosives and prohibited and dangerous weapons, while a second was arrested for possession of extremist material. On the same day, Tom Sewell, the leader of NSN, said in a video that 15 men in his group had been targeted by South Australia Police (SAPOL), counter-terrorism and the Australian Federal Police.

=== Grampians neo-Nazi trip (2021) ===
On the Australia Day weekend in January 2021, the National Socialist Network, a new group created by members of the Antipodean Resistance and the Lads Society under the latter's leader Thomas Sewell, were observed parading Nazi paraphernalia and harassing bystanders at several locations around the Grampians National Park in Victoria. One Halls Gap resident said: "There were 40 white males, many with skinheads, some chanting 'white power'". They were reported to have chanted "sieg heil" and "white power", burnt a cross, and posted stickers saying "Australia For The White Man".

Concerned citizens reported them to the police, who confronted the group and later collected video evidence from security videos. Victoria Police's Counter Terrorism Command and ASIO were notified, and the incident was widely covered in the media. One antisemitism expert called for the group to be branded a terrorist group, saying, "We know that there is a direct link between incitement, between vilification … and shooting rampages that we saw not just in Christchurch, but in other places".

=== South Australia (2022) ===
After a group of neo-Nazis had posted photographs of themselves giving fascist salutes outside the Adelaide Holocaust Museum, concerns were raised about the activities of groups such as the National Socialist Network in South Australia. On 2 September 2022, SA Minister for Multicultural Affairs Zoe Bettison said there would be a Parliamentary inquiry into "neo-Nazi symbols, the activities of extremist groups, discrimination faced by targeted groups and the prohibition on symbols in other states".

== Legislation and enforcement ==
Federal laws against terrorism are contained in Part 5.3 of the Criminal Code Act 1995. For the majority of counter-terrorism laws, the Department of Home Affairs has policy responsibility and the Attorney-General's Department has administrative responsibility.

The states and territories of Australia also have a range of acts pertaining to terrorist offences, such as the Terrorism (High Risk Offenders) Act 2017 (NSW).

== See also ==
- Australian nationalism
- Depends What You Mean by Extremist, a 2017 book by John Safran
- Far-right politics in Australia
- Islamophobia in Australia
- List of white nationalist organizations
- Racism in Australia
