= Australian Defence League =

Islamophobic white nationalist street gang

- Abbreviation: ADL
- Successor: Patriots Defence League Australia
- Formation: c. 2009
- Founder: Ralph Cerminara
- Founded at: Sydney
- Dissolved: c. 2016
- Type: Far-right
- Purpose: Australian ultranationalism Anti-Islam; Nativism; Right-wing populism
- Location: Sydney, Australia
- President: Chris Rothwell
- President, Western Sydney: Nathan Abela

The Australian Defence League (ADL) was a militant far-right, white nationalist protest group. The group was anti-Islam, and was involved in making terrorist threats, abusing, doxxing and stalking Muslim Australians. The gang was founded in Sydney in 2009 as an offshoot of the English Defence League.

== History ==
The ADL was founded in 2009 a registered not-for-profit organisation. They were founded as an offshoot of the English Defence League. It was led by Ralph Cerminera until he stepped down from the position in 2014 after being found guilty of assault. He was replaced as the group's leader by Chris Rothwell. In March 2019, Cerminera was sentenced to 9 months in prison after assaulting his neighbour.

Around 2016, the ADL splintered and, along with members from Reclaim Australia, gave rise to the short-lived Soldiers of Odin group.

== Activities ==
=== Stalking, verbal abuse and harassment ===
In 2014, the group came to national attention after it was revealed that ADL members and followers had been stalking and photographing Muslim women on public transport, verbally abusing Muslims, displaying anti-Islamic posters outside mosques, and threatening to blow up an Islamic school.

Later in 2014, in what police believe was retaliation for the bomb threat, the home of Nathan Abela, former President of the ADL, was fired upon. Following pressure by people associated with the #illridewithyou campaign, Facebook shut down pages of ADL.

On 22 December 2014, two members of the ADL were involved in a brawl outside Sydney's Lakemba mosque, arrested, and charged with affray and behaving in an offensive manner. They were subsequently convicted and jailed for five weeks.

=== Bendigo mosque protests ===
In 2014 and 2015, the organisation was involved in the Voices of Bendigo and Stop the Mosques Bendigo protests. The group was one of a number of far-right Islamophobic groups, including the Q Society, Reclaim Australia, True Blue Crew and the United Patriots Front, that opposed the construction of a $3 million mosque and Islamic community centre in Bendigo, Victoria.

== See also ==
- Antipodean Resistance Australian neo-Nazi group that emerged around the same time as Reclaim Australia.
- Australia First Party Australian far-right political party associated with Reclaim Australia.
- Far-right politics in Australia
- Far-right terrorism in Australia
- Islamophobia in Australia
- National Action (Australia) Australian neo-Nazi group.
- Romper Stomper (TV series) - TV series featuring a group similar to Reclaim Australia
- Yellow Vest Australia
- Antisemitism in Australia
