= Far-right politics in Australia =

Far-right politics in Australia describes authoritarian ideologies, including fascism and white supremacy as they manifest in Australia.

In Australia the far-right first came to public attention with the formation in 1931 of the New Guard in Sydney and its offshoot, the Centre Party in 1933. These proto-fascist groups were monarchist, anti-communist and authoritarian in outlook. These early far-right groups were followed by the explicitly fascist Australia First Movement (1941). Far-right groups and individuals in Australia went on to adopt more explicitly racial positions during the 1960s and 1970s, morphing into self-proclaimed Nazi, fascist and antisemitic movements, organisations that opposed non-white and non-Christian immigration, such as the neo-Nazi National Socialist Party of Australia (1967) and the militant white supremacist group National Action (1982).

Since 2001, Australia has seen the formation of several neo-Nazi, neo-Fascist or alt-right groups such as the True Blue Crew, the United Patriots Front, Lads Society, Fraser Anning's Conservative National Party and the Antipodean Resistance, and others.

Australian nationalism was a 19th-century movement, mostly concerned with establishing an Australian national identity, but more recently, some far-right groups have also dubbed themselves Australian nationalists.

== Overview ==
According to James Saleam, a political scientist, academic, and long time advocate of far-right ideas, the Australian far-right could be divided into four groups: Radical-Nationalism; Neo-Nazism; Populist-Monarchism; Radical-Populism.

- The first group is characterised by its doctrinal reference to the Australian labour, republican, and nationalist heritage, and their rejection towards the imperial, American-alliance or client-internationalist phases of their country.
- The second group conglomerates movements directly influenced by international neo-Nazism, including white supremacists and the skinhead movement.
- The third group is composed of movements which advocate for a populist interpretation of the Australian Constitution and support for a depersonalised monarchy as an embodiment of popular will.
- The fourth group is supportive of popular democracy, gun ownership and grassroots activism under a populist underpinning.

Although recognising that it is not an homogeneous movement, Dean et al. (2016) identified six fundamental cores among the Australian radical right: opposition towards immigration, anti-establishment and anti-elitist rhetoric, the protection of western values and culture, a radical regeneration of the democratic system within the democratic system, a return to traditional values in opposition to multiculturalism, and a support to a strong state committed to law and order.

Australia's transition away from the bipartisan immigration framework associated with the White Australia policy began with the passage of the Migration Act 1958, which abolished the dictation test formerly used to restrict non-European immigration. In 1973, the government of Gough Whitlam introduced policies stating that race would no longer be considered a criterion for immigration to Australia. Arthur Calwell of the Labour Party and leader of the Opposition from 1960 to 1967, was the last major political leader to staunchly defend the White Australia policy. Opposition to multiculturalism later became associated with segments of the Australian far-right, including Pauline Hanson, whose 1996 maiden speech argued that excessive multiculturalism threatened national cohesion.

Neo-Nazi groups such as the National Socialist Network have become more prominent in the 2020s.

== History ==
=== 1901–1945 ===
Far-right groups in Australia first appeared after the country's federation in 1901, though the most significant groups appeared after the end of World War I, following the post-war economic depression, rising communist agitation and the election of a radical Labor government in New South Wales, led by Jack Lang. The 1920s saw a rise of paramilitary far-right formations, including the Old Guard, the League of National Security (also known as the White Army), the Citizens' Defence Brigade, the X Force, the Emergency Committee of South Australia, and the Constitutional Association; most of those were supportive of an Anglo-Australian conservatism and British loyalism rather than espousing a palingenetic and nationalist ideology characteristic of contemporary fascist movements in the era The Old Guard gathered a total of 30,000 members and a support base mainly composed of Australia's business elites and conservative politicians. The Guard maintained a clandestine watch on public affairs, stockpiling weapons to intervene after an hypothetical collapse of the government. The failure of Lang's labourist government to prevent economic distress, deemed as a ‘socialistic’ regime by the Old Guard, lead to the group to represent a strong opposition against its policies.

The Depression years and the political crisis intensified the mobilization of conservative paramilitarism in response to the dual challenges represented by both the far-left and Lang's Labor populism, leading to the formation of more radicalized far-right groups during the early 1930s, including the formation of the Citizens' League of South Australia, the New Guard and fractious members of the All for Australia League (AFAL) and League of National Security. Both the AFAL and the New Guard were launched in February 1931, the later by Colonel Eric Campbell and other military officers as a splinter group of the conservative Old Guard in reaction to its 'passive' position. The New Guard derived from a conservative and pro-capitalist ideological tradition, supporting a pro-British imperial patriotism while holding anti-socialist and individualist stances, and argued for a ‘government run by experts’ as the ideal model for Australia. The AFAL, in contrast, held more a most moderate position, with its conservative ideology rooted in British liberalism. However, the labour movement still perceived a ‘fascist menace’ in it. The New Guard held a strong position against both Bolshevism and trade unionism, forming links with employers’ associations as a way to persuade anti-communist workers to counter-rest trade unions; the New Guard maintained a more public approach and a working-class based support in contrast with its predecessor. Lang's dismissal in 1932 lead to the New Guard to a gradual fade, as its existence as a reaction force against Lang's regime had become redundant.

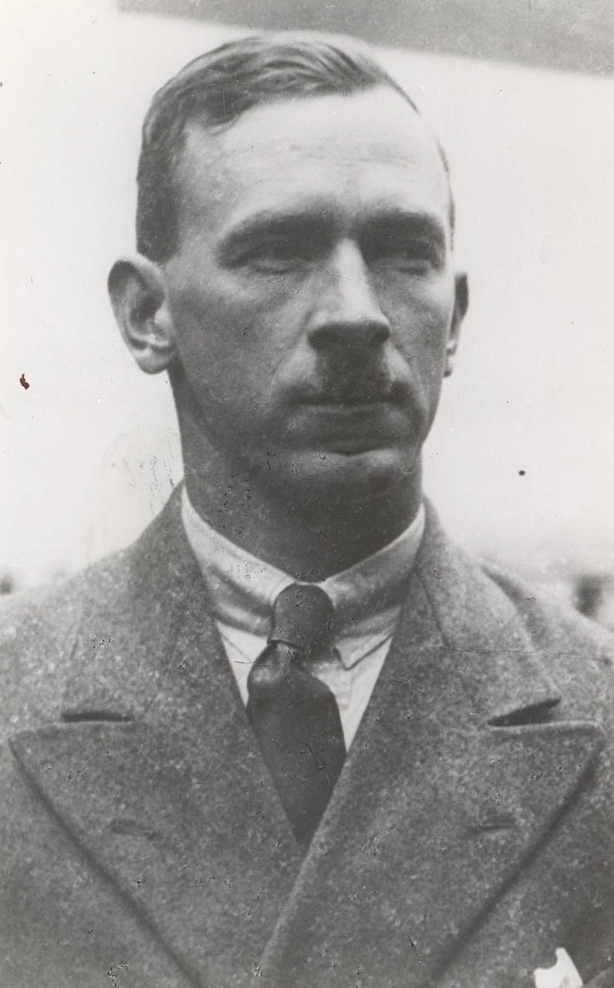
P. R. Stephensen sought to promote a nativist national identity separated from British influence.

Local support for Fascism also emerged during the 1930s in the Australian-Italian community, through the formation of Fascio social organizations in support of Benito Mussolini, with presence in Victoria, New South Wales, and Western Australia. National Socialism, in a similar way, also got local support through the establishment of local strongholds in support of the National Socialist German Workers Party (NSDAP), with the formation of a local stronghold in Adelaide in 1932 and consequent expansion to other capitals the following years, and the formal establishment of the NSDAP in Australian territory in 1934. After Campbell's tour to Germany and Italy in 1933, and meeting with British fascist Sir Oswald Mosley in Europe, the New Guard incorporated fascist rituals, including uniforms and the Roman salute, leading to the departure of some of its membership. In 1933, he founded the Centre Party, structured on the fascist parties in Europe and with support of Mosley to form an imperial network of fascist groups. However, by the mid-1930s, the party had disbanded. Alexander Rud Mills, a local Melbourne lawyer, took a more spiritual approach towards the far-right by the foundation of an Odinist cult, supporting a racial interpretation of Odinism as a way to restore the Australian nation. Mills wrote several books aimed at the restoration of the British tradition in Australia, and maintained contact with international fascist and national socialist circles, meeting Adolf Hitler in the 1930s.

Nativist expressions of Australian nationalism, distanced from the pro-British tendencies prominent in the Australian far-right, emerged during the decade around the figure of the poet and writer Percy R. Stephensen and his journal The Publicist. Stephensen, a former communist and literary provocateur, drew together heterogeneous intellectual strands—anti-imperialism, anti-democracy, antisemitism, cultural and racial nationalism, and an anti-British nativism—into a localized fascist movement. Stephensen collaborated with the Jindyworobak poets, championed Aboriginal cultural motifs as the spiritual foundation of the new Australian identity, and co-founded an Aborigines' Progressive Association. Two years after Australia's entry in World War II, and with help of The Publicist collaborator William J. Miles and former communist Adela Pankhurst, P. R. Stephenson founded the Australia First Movement (AFM) in October 1941, receiving support from Mills and other nationalist intellectuals such as the poet Ian Mudie. The AFM was aligned with the Axis powers ideology, and sought a political alliance with Japan to secure Australian autonomy from the British Empire. As a result, followers of the movement were classified as a 'security threat' by the state and were arrested by authorities. The AFM saw its termination after the internment of Stephensen and other members in March 1942, where Stephensen's admiration for Hitler and Nazism as a 'regenerationist force' contributed to his condemnation. By the end of the war, fascist groups in Australia were already banned and several key figures within the fascist movement were persecuted and interned.

=== 1946–1990s ===
Following the end of World War II, the far-right was widely perceived as a spent political force in Australia. Certain far-right groups, such as the Australian Nationalist Movement and the White Australia League, were established with links to former AFM members. Displaced European individuals who resettled on Australian territory after the war also formed ethnic nationalist groups, leading to the establishment of right-wing and veterans' organizations in Australia, with some of those creating links with local branches of the Anti-Bolshevik Bloc of Nations and the Captive Nations Council. Distancing itself from nationalism, the Right's view regarding isolationism changed drastically as the global landscape evolved towards an external contest between the USA and the USSR, or as an struggle between capital and the far-left. By 1949, Australia's geopolitical position was determined under Robert Menzies’s presidency, whose regime acted as a conservative reaction against international communism. Social credit ideology survived after 1945 after being inherited by Eric Butler and his Australian League of Rights (ALR), founded in 1946. Following the antisemitism typical of pre-war far-right groups, the ALR considered jews as the force of centralization and inequity in Australia, and its ideology was based on a pro-British loyalist platform, although they also adopted an anti-communist position as a core tenet. The ALR exerted pressure on mainstream right-wing parties such as the Liberal and National parties, whom they tried to infiltrate and replace their core values in a strategy of entryism.

Through the 1950s and the 1960s, sporadic attempts to form a neo-Nazi party failed politically, with the Australian National Socialist Party (ANSP) becoming an unstable and weak organization as clashes among the leadership emerged. The Australian Nationalist Workers Party, formed in 1959, established ties with prominent neo-Nazis in Britain and the United States, such as Colin Jordan and George Lincoln Rockwell, though the later was not allowed to enter Australian territory. In 1968, the National Socialist Party of Australia (NSPA) formed as the main neo-Nazi organization in Australia, reorienting traditional National Socialism towards an Australian character while blending Henry Lawson’s writtings on the ideology. The Australian neo-Nazi scene was mostly driven by anti-Zionism and the suspicion of a Zionist Occupation Government, while they desired the establishment of an ethno-state based on Aryan mythology.

By the 1960s, the conservative right's position was already established and focused on anti-communism and a commitment to the US alliance in the Cold War rather than supporting nationalism and racial politics, contrasting sharply with the racial nationalist view of defending a ‘White Australia’ prominent in far-right groups. The gradual abandonment of the White Australia Policy from 1966 to 1973 lead to the rise of right-wing and far-right groups nationwide. The increase of immigration of Vietnamese refugees after the Vietnam War in the 1970s, with recession in the early 1980s, led the public to perceive a threat due to Asian immigration. Initially, most of the Australian Left opposed the arrival of Vietnamese refugees to the country; it was mostly supported by establishment conservatives and anti-communists. However, opposition towards immigration—particularly from Asia—also became a significant theme in far-right groups, shifting the narrative of communism and Jews as enemies of the nation to immigrants and refugees. Organizations such as the Australian National Alliance (ANA) and the Progressive Conservative Party (PCP), which included adherents from the earliest groups opposed to the abandonment of White Australia, vociferously opposed the Vietnamese refugee influx and increasing non-European immigration in the country, although the defeat of the PCP in the 1980 elections lead the party to fade.

During the 1980s, a new 'radical-nationalist' current appeared within far-right groups, developed by the Australian National Action (NA) and characterized by its aggressivity and isolation from mainstream right-wing groups, as well as its influence in the Australian labour-nativist-republican tradition prominent in the early XX century. Born as a reaction to immigration, NA lead a campaign of political violence against distinct targets, ranging from immigrants to homosexuals, progressive organizations and anti-racist groups. The 1980s also saw an emergence of internationally inspired neo-Nazi groups, including both esoteric circles and skinheads. Racist violence was also promoted by the Australian Nationalists Movement (ANM), formed as an splinter group of NA, and whose members carried out a violent campaign against ethnic Chinese people, including the firebombing of a number of Chinese restaurants. In 1988, the National Inquiry into Racist Violence was established by the Human Rights and Equal Opportunity Commission in reaction to a perceived rise in racist attacks, and concluded that both the NA and the ANM had been involved in direct violence against minorities based on their ethnic identity. Both groups went into decline in the 1990s as their members got arrested and jailed.

=== 1990s–present ===
One Nation, a right-wing populist party led by Pauline Hanson, emerged in the late 1990s, popularising the anti-immigration and nationalist discourse, thought Hanson and her party represented a different strand from the fascist and extreme right groups present in previous years.

== Political groups ==
=== Organizations ===
An early exponent of fascist ideology in Australia was the writer and poet William Baylebridge, who was later associated with P. R. Stephensen and the Australia First Movement in the 1930s and early 1940s.

==== The New Guard (1930s) ====
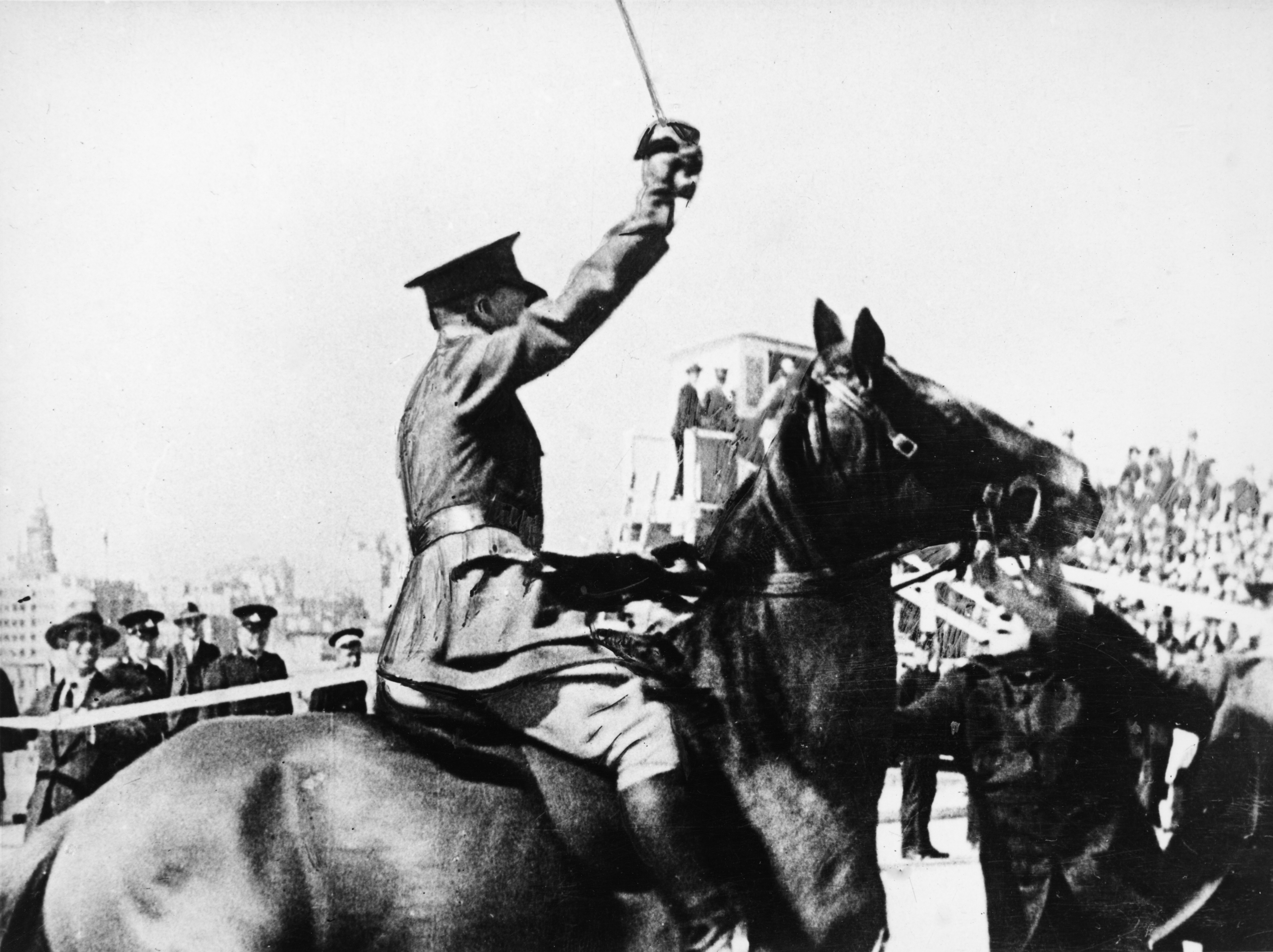
Captain de Groot declares the Sydney Harbour Bridge open in March 1932.

The Australian far right rose out of the monarchist and anti-communist movements. Formed in Sydney on 16 February 1931, the New Guard was the first and largest fascist organisation in Australia. It was formed by World War I veteran, Australian monarchist and anti-communist, Eric Campbell. The group comprised mostly returned servicemen and claimed a membership of 50,000 at its peak, including prominent members of society such as aviator Sir Charles Kingsford Smith and former Mayor of North Sydney Hubert Primrose.

The New Guard was a paramilitary organisation with its members being well armed and receiving military training. The New Guard under Campbell orchestrated a number of operations, including strike breaking, attacking Labor Party members and "Communist" meetings; they also demanded the deportation of Communists. During the initial growth of the movement, Campbell was able to attract many ex-soldiers and ex-commanders to the movement.

The New Guard saw the Premier of New South Wales Jack Lang as an immediate threat. The organisation attracted attention when member Francis de Groot, on horseback and at Campbell's direction, upstaged Lang in cutting the ribbon at the opening ceremony of the Sydney Harbour Bridge in protest at Lang's anti-monarchist sentiments.

After Lang's dismissal in May 1932 the New Guard's membership declined rapidly.

==== White Army ====
The White Army (so named after the Russian White Army), also known as the League of National Security (LNS), was formed in Victoria around 1931, headed by the Chief Commissioner of Victoria Police, Thomas Blamey and described as a fascist paramilitary group. The group, which existed for about eight years from 1931, comprised several senior army officers, including Col. Francis Derham, a Melbourne lawyer, and Lt. Col. Edmund Herring, later Chief Justice of Victoria. Some members had been members of the New Guard, and both groups were involved in street fights with leftist groups. This was reportedly a response to the rise of communism in Australia. Its members stood ready to take up arms to stop a Catholic or communist revolution.

==== Australia First Movement (1941–1942) ====
The Australia First Movement was a short-lived Australian fascist movement founded in October 1941. The group was antisemitic and national socialist, advocating the corporate state and a political alliance with the Axis powers of Germany, Italy and Japan.

The group was disbanded in March 1942, when a number of its members were secretly interned by the Australian government on suspicion that they might attempt to provide help to Japanese invaders. Two members were convicted of treason. Australia First Movement member and former member of the Centre Party Adela Pankhurst, of the famous suffragette family, was arrested and interned in 1942 for her advocacy of peace with Japan.

==== Australian League of Rights ====
The Australian League of Rights is an antisemitic political organisation. It was founded in Adelaide, South Australia by Eric Butler in 1946, and organised nationally in 1960. The party's ideology was based on the economic theory of Social Credit expounded by C. H. Douglas. The League describes itself as upholding the values of "loyalty to God, Queen and Country".

The group inspired groups like the British League of Rights, Canadian League of Rights and the New Zealand League of Rights. In 1972 Butler created an umbrella group, the Crown Commonwealth League of Rights, to represent the four groups; it also served as a chapter of the World League for Freedom and Democracy.

==== Free Palestine Committee (1967) ====
Ideologically a National Socialist and antisemitic group, its leadership was associated with the ANFSJ and the NSPA, two notorious neo-Nazi organizations. The Free Palestine Committee was an anti-Zionist organization formed in Canberra around the time of the Arab–Israeli war in 1967, with the purpose to assist Arab countries in the conflict. Founded by Graeme Theo Royce, it was formed by representatives of the Australia‐Arab Friendship Association in New South Wales, the ACT-based Australia‐Arab Friendship League and the Australian National Front for Social Justice (ANFSJ). The group was led by Royce alongside Frank Molner, who served as an office bearer of the committee, and Ted Cawthron.

==== National Action (1982–1991) ====
National Action was a militant white supremacist group founded on Anzac Day 1982 by the former deputy leader of the National Socialist Party of Australia, Jim Saleam and former neo-Nazi David Greason.

In 1989, Saleam was convicted of being an accessory before the fact in regard to organising the attempted assassination of African National Congress representative Eddie Funde. Saleam claimed to have been set up by police.

In 1991, the group was disbanded following the murder of a member, Wayne "Bovver" Smith, in the group's headquarters in the Sydney suburb of Tempe. Following the murder of Smith, Saleam became NSW chairman of Australia First Party.

==== Australian Nationalist Movement (1985–2007) ====
The Australian Nationalist Movement (ANM), also known as the Australian Nationalist Worker's Union (ANWU), was a Western Australian neo-Nazi, extreme right-wing group founded and led by Peter Joseph "Jack" van Tongeren.

In 1987, Van Tongeren distributed 400,000 racist posters around Perth. The posters bore phrases such as "No Asians", "White Revolution The Only Solution", "Coloured Immigration: Trickle Is Now A Flood" and "Asians Out Or Racial War". Van Tongeren is a holocaust denier.

In 1989, Van Tongeren staged a series of racially motivated arson attacks, targeting businesses owned by Asian Australians. Van Tongeren served thirteen years in prison for his crimes. In the late 1980s it was revealed that his father was Javanese, making him of Indonesian ancestry. He resumed anti-Asian activities upon his release in 2002 leading to further convictions in 2006.

In 1989, two ANM members murdered police informant David Locke. The murder trial of the two men eventually led to Van Tongeren being found guilty of 53 crimes and sentenced to 18 years. The two men who murdered David Locke received life sentences.

On being released from jail in 2002, Van Tongeren expressed no remorse. In February 2004 three Chinese restaurants, synagogues and Asian-owned businesses were firebombed, plastered with posters and daubed with swastikas. Western Australian police launched "Operation Atlantic" in response to the attacks, leading to the arrest of five men involved in the attacks. The police also identified a plot to harm WA Attorney-General Jim McGinty and his family, among others.

In August 2004, Van Tongeren and his co-accused Matthew Billing were found and arrested in the Boddington area south-east of Perth. Both men once again faced the courts over the 2004 arson plots. During a hearing on 2 November, Van Tongeren collapsed, was taken to hospital, and later used a wheelchair. Van Tongeren was released from jail on the condition that he leave Western Australia. In 2007 the ANM/ANWU was reported to have been disbanded. Van Tongeren has been a member of a number of far-right extremist groups including National Action (Australia)

==== Antipodean Resistance (2016–2018) ====
Antipodean Resistance (AR) is an Australian neo-Nazi group. Formed in October 2016, the group's flag features a swastika. The group's logo features the black sun and Totenkopf (skull head) with an Akubra hat, a laurel wreath and a swastika. Antipodean Resistance promotes and incites hatred and violence, as illustrated in its anti-Jewish and anti-homosexual posters, with graphic images of shooting Jews and homosexuals in the head. One poster called to "Legalise the execution of Jews."

In 2017, it was reported that ASIO, the Australian national security organisation, was monitoring the group, who were "willing to use violence to further their own interests".

Members of the Antipodean Resistance and Lads Society organised the creation of a new group, the National Socialist Network, in 2020.

==== Australian Defence League (2009–??) ====
The Australian Defence League (ADL) is a neo-Nazi street gang. The gang is anti-Islam, and has been involved in making terrorist threats, abusing, stalking and doxxing Muslim Australians. The gang was founded in Sydney in 2009 by recidivist criminal Ralph Cerminara. Cerminara has a significant criminal record, including convictions for assault, high-range drink-driving and breaching apprehended violence orders.

===== Q Society of Australia (2010–2020) =====
The Q Society of Australia was a far-right, homophobic and Islamophobic organisation that opposed Muslim immigration and the presence of Muslims in Australian society. Founded in 2010, Q Society referred to itself as "Australia's leading Islam-critical organisation" and stated that its purpose was to fight against the "Islamisation of Australia". The group's events featured extreme homophobia and Islamophobia. Its president was Debbie Robinson, who was also president of the Australian Liberty Alliance (later Yellow Vest Australia). On 13 February 2020, the Q Society stated that it would deregister itself due to lack of financial support, effective from 30 June 2020.

==== Creativity Movement/Alliance ====
The Creativity Movement, self-described as a "church" but in reality an anti-Christian, white supremacist, neo-Nazi organisation, was founded in the United States in 1997 as an offshoot of the 1973 Church of the Creator, and had adherents in Australia until 2010. The group ceased to exist elsewhere in the world by 2020, and the police seized the Creativity Movement website in 2021. The domain name creativitymovement.org is now held by the Creativity Alliance. Founded in 2003 after the arrest of the American Creativity Movement leader, Matt Hale, the Creativity Alliance is an Adelaide-based offshoot of the Church of the Creator, run by Cailen Cambeul.

The Creativity Alliance includes numerous Church of Creativity groups, such as the "Church of Creativity – Victoria", with its now-defunct website stating that it is "A Creativity Alliance website", was operational from at least 2004 until 2017 and has since been blended into the main Creativity Alliance website along with all other regional Church of Creativity websites. The Victorian website stated that it "objects to... Christianity, multiculturalism and Marxism". A 2010 version of the website listed its five core beliefs, including "our Race is our Religion;... the White Race is Nature's Finest; ... Racial Loyalty is the greatest of all honors, and racial treason is the worst of all crimes; ...what is good for the White Race is the highest virtue, and what is bad for the White Race is the ultimate sin; ...[and] that the one and only, true and revolutionary White Racial Religion – Creativity – is the only salvation for the White Race".

A Liberal Party campaigner who had been a leading member of the Young Liberals in Geelong, Scott Harrison, was revealed to have been a member of this organisation for six years prior to 2010, but had turned his back on those beliefs. He resigned from the Liberal Party after antisemitic articles written by him emerged, including airing a theory that the Port Arthur massacre was master-minded by Jews, as well as a photo of him gesturing with a Nazi salute in front of a swastika.

Some activity by members were reported in Melbourne and the Surf Coast in 2015. In 2011, after stickers advocating "White Power" were found in Victoria, the group was investigated by the state's Multicultural Affairs Minister. The group says it is committed to achieving its aims by non-violent means.

==== The Dingoes (2016–2019) ====
In 2016 the Dingoes were described in a 2016 news report as "young, educated and alternative right", comparing the group to the Identitarian movement in Europe. The group self-described themselves as "politically incorrect larrikins", and one member praised Donald Trump for embodying "white values". Members do not reveal their identity.

The Dingoes were mentioned as one of the groups involved in the 2018 infiltration to the NSW Young Nationals (see below). National Party MP George Christensen and One Nation candidate Mark Latham were both was interviewed on the Dingoes podcast, called The Convict Report, but Christensen later said that he would not have done it if he had known about their extremist views. The podcast also featured a New Zealand man who ran the Dominion Movement, who was later arrested for sharing information that threatened NZ security. The group planned a 2018 conference in Sydney, dubbed DingoCon, at which US alt-right figure Mike Enoch of The Right Stuff was invited to speak.

The group posts antisemitic and other racist commentary on Twitter, and have used the same meme character as the perpetrator of the 2019 Christchurch mosque shootings. The podcast was shut down after the attack.

==== United Patriots Front (2015–2017) ====
The United Patriots Front (UPF) was a far-right extremist group whose membership was composed of neo-Nazis and fundamentalist Christians. Based in the state of Victoria, UPF was a nationalist anti-Islam organisation that stood in opposition to immigration, opposition to multiculturalism and Islam by demonstrations. It was a splinter group from Reclaim Australia group, formed after a dispute between Shermon Burgess and Reclaim Australia organisers. The group has been described by a number of media outlets and journalists as a hate group, and has claimed solidarity with Golden Dawn. The group was disbanded in 2017. The UPF's leaders went on to form a new, more explicitly White nationalist group, the Lads Society, later that same year.

===== Lads Society (2017–2020) =====
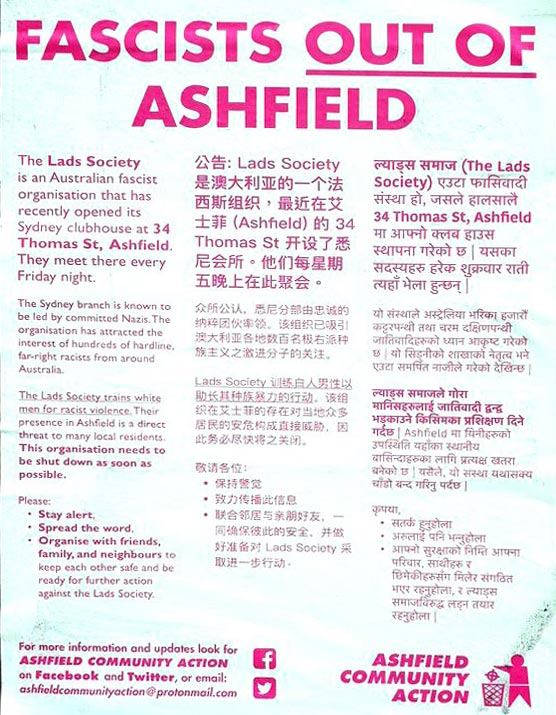
Ashfield Community Action group Antifascist poster protesting the presence of Lads Society in Ashfield

The Lads Society is a far-right white nationalist extremist group founded by several former members of the United Patriots Front in late 2017, with club houses in Sydney and Melbourne. The Lads Society came to national prominence after it staged a rally in St Kilda, Victoria, targeting the local African Australian community. Attendees were seen making the Nazi salute and one was photographed brandishing an SS helmet. In 2017, the group's leader Thomas Sewell approached the perpetrator of the Christchurch mosque shootings, Brenton Harrison Tarrant, asking him to join the Lads Society, but Tarrant refused. The group's members and allies attempted to infiltrate the Young Nationals in NSW, and engaged in branch stacking at the May 2018 conference. Lads Society members attained leadership positions in the Young Nationals, but were later forced out of the party. Canadian alt-right activist Lauren Southern and white nationalist Stefan Molyneux met with Lads Society members during their visit to Australia.

Undated videos leaked to the press in November 2019 revealed Lads Society leader Sewell's aim to attract and recruit members from mainstream society under the guise of a men's fitness club. His white supremacist agenda was clearly shown as he outlined plans which included the creation of "Anglo-European" enclaves in Australian cities, encouraging the "speed and ferocity of the decay" of society to help foment a "race war" by such tactics as exploiting the "African gangs" trope used by Home Affairs Minister Peter Dutton and other mainstream politicians.

Members of the Lads Society and Antipodean Resistance organised the creation of a new group, the National Socialist Network, in late 2020, and Sewell was one of the organisers of a 2021 group trip to the Grampians in January 2021 (see below).

==== National Socialist Network (2020–2026) ====
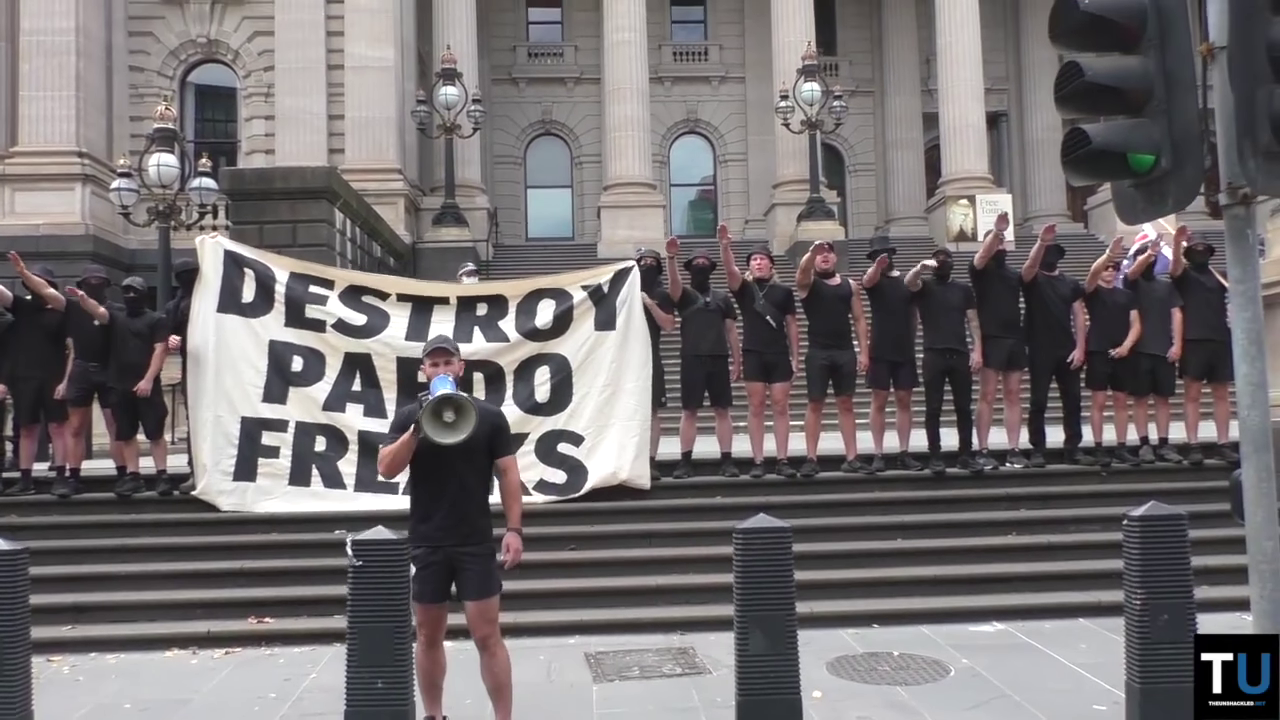
Members of the National Socialist Network doing Nazi salutes on 18 March 2023

The National Socialist Network (NSN) was formed by members of the Lads Society and Antipodean Resistance in late 2020. It is a Melbourne-based neo-Nazi group that claims to be active in Adelaide, Melbourne, Sydney, Brisbane, Canberra, Perth and several regional cities, but which would not reveal how many members or associates the group has. It has vowed to bring about a "white revolution" and has openly described Indigenous Australians as "subhuman and monkeys". They also engage in antisemitic and other racist behaviour. Its leader is Thomas Sewell, an ex-Australian army soldier turned neo-Nazi, who is also leader of the Lads Society.

The group helped to organise a group of about 38 young white men who paraded Nazi symbolism and shouted offensive slogans in the Grampians region over the Australia Day weekend in January 2021 (see below).

In March 2021, Victoria Police's counter-terrorism command charged Sewell with affray, recklessly causing injury, and unlawful assault after he allegedly punched a security guard working for the Nine Network in Melbourne's Docklands. The alleged assault took place prior to the broadcast of an A Current Affair report about Sewell's organisation.

In 2026, as a response to proposed hate speech laws in Australia, the organisation announced on Telegram that it would disband before 18 January.

On 15 May 2026 the organisation was banned by the government under new laws against hate groups. The group is mounting a legal challenge to the government's ban of the group.

==== New Guard (2015–2018) ====
The New Guard (not to be confused with the 1930s New Guard mentioned above) was a group with a presence on Facebook between 2015 and 2018. Self-described as fascists, the group's aim was to influence mainstream politics. Their tactics included spreading propaganda about protecting Australia's European identity as well as opening businesses and buying property to create wealth, using this to try to influence the election of state and federal parliamentarians. Part of the group's plans was to create a kind of "pioneer Europa", where people subscribing to such views would live, governed by a sympathetic mayor. The men-only group was revealed to have infiltrated the Young Nationals in New South Wales in late 2018, leading to its demise.

==== Reclaim Australia (2015–2017) ====
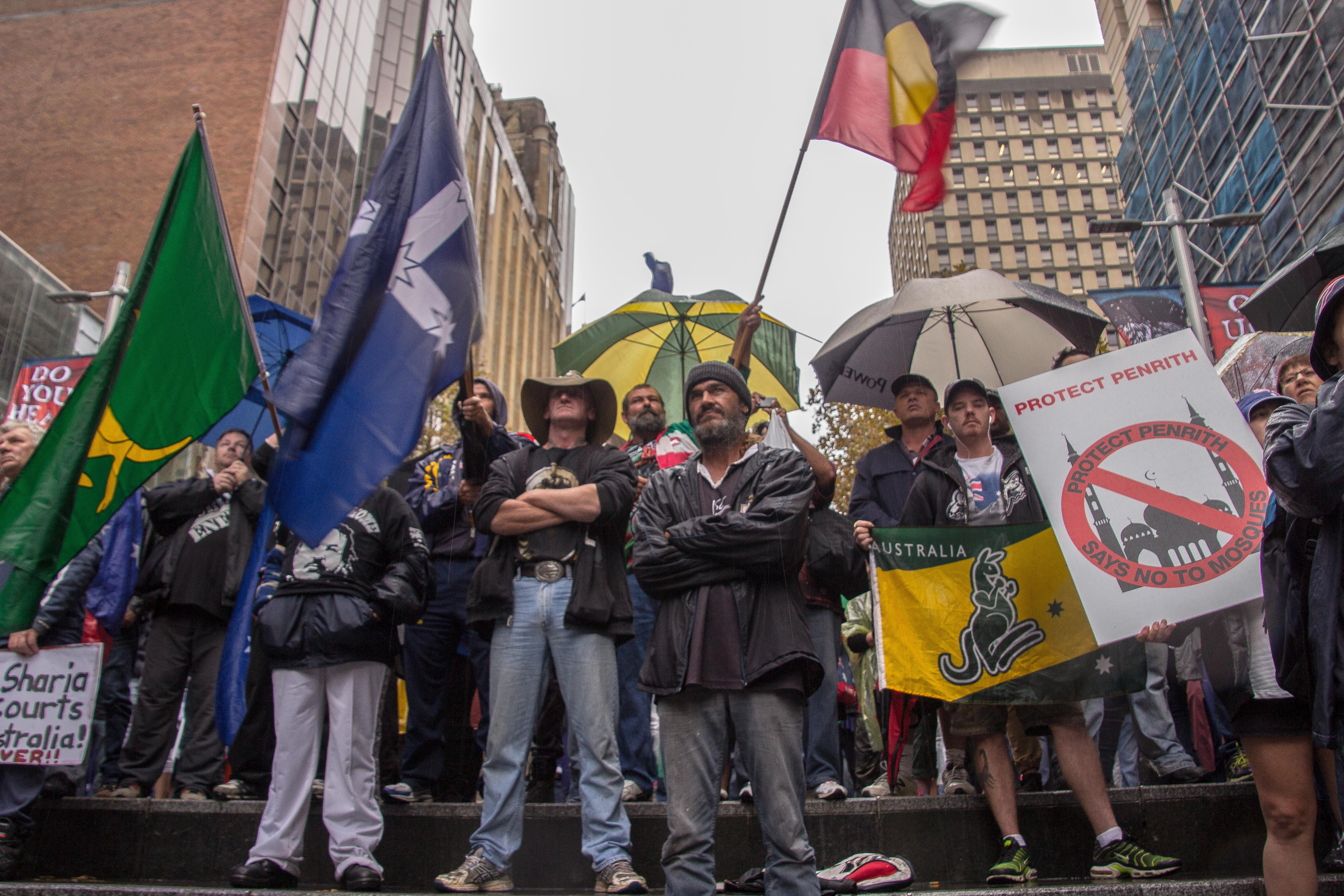
Reclaim Australia rally, Sydney, April 2015

Formed in 2015, Reclaim Australia is a loosely associated far-right Australian nationalist protest group which draws support from nationalists, white supremacists, neo-Nazis and other far-right groups, which is primarily focused on opposing Islam. The group held street rallies between 2015 and 2017, and often faced counter-protests from trade unions, human rights and anti-racism activists. After observing many Reclaim Australia rallies and interviewing participants, author John Safran described it as a loose collective of different groups such as the United Patriots Front and Danny Nalliah's Catch the Fire Ministries.

The Australian Security Intelligence Organisation (ASIO), says that it monitors the group because of its potential for violence.

==== Soldiers of Odin Australia ====
Soldiers of Odin (SOO) is an anti-immigrant group founded in Kemi, Finland, in October 2015, in the midst of the European migrant crisis. The Soldiers of Odin Australia arose out of the Reclaim Australia group, and was registered as a non-profit association with the Victorian government in June 2016. That same year the group ran racially-driven vigilante "safety patrols" around Federation Square, Birrarung Marr and Bourke Street Mall and outside city train stations at night to counteract what it claims was the inability of police to protect the public from rising street crime and gangs such as the so-called Apex gang. They also distributed food to homeless people in the city.

Their recruitment rhetoric included exaggerating illegal entry to the country, crime perpetrated by immigrants and the threat of Islamic terrorism, targeting mainly Anglo-Australian men; they also used the "exotic Norse mythology" to attract far-right sympathisers who were willing to take public action.

While they attracted significant press coverage in the second half of 2016, their presence seemed to have faded fairly quickly, and by 2020 they were no longer deemed a significant far-right group.

==== True Blue Crew (2015–??) ====
The True Blue Crew (TBC) is an Australian militant white supremacist group. Members and supporters have been linked to right-wing terrorism and vigilantism, and members have been arrested with weapons and on terrorism-related charges. Experts who have studied the group say it appears to be "committed to violence". The True Blue Crew was formed in 2015 as a splinter group from the anti-Islamic Reclaim Australia group, along with a number of small far-right nationalist groups such as the United Patriots Front.

In December 2019 a member of True Blue Crew, Phillip Galea, was convicted of terrorism charges relating to planned bombings of the Victorian Trades Hall and other left wing organisations in Melbourne.

=== Political parties ===
==== The Centre Party (1933–1935) ====
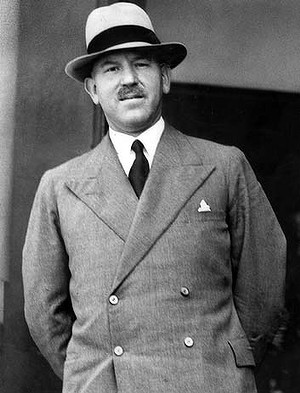
Colonel Eric Campbell, 1931

The Centre Party was a fascist political party formed in December 1933, following Lang's dismissal and the demise of the New Guard. Eric Campbell established the party after he had met with European fascists and National Socialists such as Sir Oswald Mosley and Joachim von Ribbentrop. Campbell repositioned the remnants of the New Guard away from paramilitary activities and into electoral politics.

The Centre Party contested the May 1935 New South Wales state election, polling 0.60% of the total vote. Following the party's poor showing at the election Campbell withdrew from public life and the party disbanded.

==== Australian National Socialist Party (1962–1968) ====
The Australian National Socialist Party (ANSP) was a minor Australian neo-Nazi party. The party was founded in 1962 by University of Adelaide physics student Ted Cawthron and Sydney council worker Don Lindsay. The group was anti-communist, and supported the White Australia policy and the total annexation of New Guinea.

On 26 June 1964, the party's headquarters were raided by police. Party leader Athur Smith and four party members were arrested and convicted of possessing unlicensed firearms and explosives and possession of stolen goods. By 1967 the remnants of the party had joined the newly formed National Socialist Party of Australia.

==== National Socialist Party of Australia (1967–1970s) ====
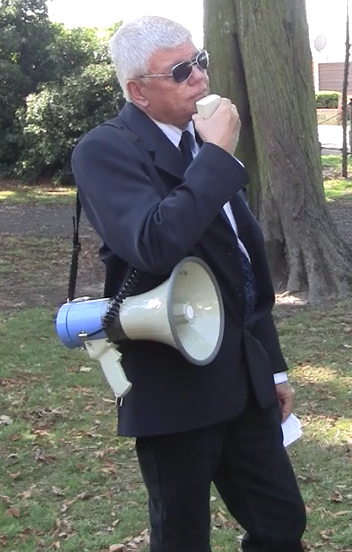
Jim Saleam, 2013

The National Socialist Party of Australia (NSPA) was a minor Australian neo-Nazi party formed in 1967 by former ANSP leader Ted Cawthron. In May 1968, the ANSP merged into the NSPA, and Cawthron and Frank Molnar attempted to distance themselves and the party from the "jackbooted 'Nazi' image" associated with the ANSP.

In early 1970, Cawthron contested the May 1970 ACT by-election, making him the first National Socialist in Australia to run for public office. The party also made a number of unsuccessful runs for the Senate.

Jim Saleam was made deputy leader of the party between 1972 and 1975. Saleam became a prominent figure in far-right politics, going on to found National Action in 1982 and the Australia First Party 1996.

==== One Nation ====
Pauline Hanson's One Nation, or One Nation for short, is a far-right populist party founded by Pauline Hanson on 11 April 1997. From its inception, One Nation has argued against multiculturalism in Australia. In her 1998 maiden speech, Hanson argued that Australia was "in danger of being swamped by Asians" and undergoing "Asianisation". In recent years, One Nation and elected officials have attacked Muslims and Muslim immigration.

==== Australians Against Further Immigration (1989–2008) ====
Australians Against Further Immigration (AAFI) was an Australian far-right anti-immigration political party which described itself as "eco-nationalist" and was against positive net immigration. The party was founded in 1989 and dissolved in 2008. The party was deregistered by the Australian Electoral Commission in December 2005, because it was lacking the minimum 500 members required to be registered as a political party.

==== Australia First Party ====
The Australia First Party (AFP) is a militant white supremacist political party founded in 1996 by Graeme Campbell and currently led by Jim Saleam. The party stands on a nationalist, anti-multicultural and economic protectionist platform. The Party's current platform includes the reintroduction of the White Australia policy and opposition to Chinese immigration.

Campbell was Australia First's leader until June 2001, when he left the party to stand as a One Nation Senate candidate in Western Australia. After serving time in jail for organising the failed attempted assassination of Eddie Funde, Saleam took control of the party and ran as an its candidate for a seat on Marrickville council, New South Wales, claiming "to oppose Marrickville being a Refugee Welcome Zone". Later that year the party formed its youth wing, the Patriotic Youth League. The party contested the 2010 federal election, the 2013 federal election, the 2016 federal election, the 2017 Cootamundra state by-election, the 2018 Longman by-election, and the 2019 New South Wales state election, but failed to poll at more than 2% on any occasion.

Saleam's platform included the reintroduction of the White Australia policy and opposition to Chinese immigration.

On 20 March 2019, Australia First member Nathan Sykes was charged with at least eight offences relating to threats he made to a number of journalists.

===== Patriotic Youth League/Eureka Youth League =====
The Patriotic Youth League (PLY) was a neo-Nazi micro group and the youth wing of the Australia First Party, founded in 2002 by former One Nation activist Stuart McBeth. The Patriotic Youth League was mainly active in the northern suburbs of Sydney and Melbourne, and played a large role in the 2005 Cronulla riots. It disbanded in 2006, but was reincarnated as the Eureka Youth League in 2010.

==== Australian Protectionist Party ====
The Australian Protectionist Party (also known as the Party For Freedom) is a minor far-right anti-immigration party, focused on economic protectionism and white nationalism. The Australian Protectionist Party has been active in protesting against the presence of asylum seekers and Muslims, and has also organised several protests against Sharia law being implemented in Australia. The party has unsuccessfully contested a number of elections, failing to secure more than 1% of the vote in any election it has contested.

The APP has been essentially inactive since 2016, with the only evidence of any activity being the occasional post on its website.

==== Rise Up Australia Party (2011–2019) ====
The Rise Up Australia Party was a far-right, Christian political party launched in June 2011. The party's policy platform was focused on nationalist and fundamentalist Christian values. It was opposed to Islam in Australia and opposes same-sex marriage. Its slogan was "Keep Australia Australian". The party was founded and was led by Pentecostal minister Danny Nalliah, who is also the president of Catch the Fire Ministries. Nalliah is originally from Sri Lanka, and has worked and lived in Saudi Arabia with his family.

The Rise up Australia party opposed multiculturalism, wanted to preserve Australia's "Judeo-Christian heritage", called for cuts to Muslim immigration, and advocated freedom of speech and freedom of religion. In the 2013 federal election the party contested seats in most territories and states, and lobbied for changing the name of the immigration department under the Abbott government from immigration and cultural affairs to immigration and border protection. After the 2019 Australian federal election, on 26 June 2019, the party was voluntarily deregistered by the Australian Electoral Commission.

==== Australian Liberty Alliance (2015–2020) ====
The Australian Liberty Alliance (ALA), created in 2015, was rebranded as Yellow Vest Australia in 2019. It was a minor political party in Australia, with Debbie Robinson as party president. The party was the political wing of the Q Society. Founded in 2015, the party was anti-Islamic, with policies focusing on Muslim immigration such as enforcing "integration over separation", replacing multiculturalism with an integrated multi-ethnic society and stopping public funding for "associations formed around foreign nationalities". They vowed to "stop the Islamisation of Australia". The party was deregistered in 2020.

==== Love Australia or Leave (2016–2022) ====
Love Australia or Leave was a far-right, nationalist political party based in Queensland. It has been registered for federal elections from October 2016 until 12 January 2022. after being founded by Kim Vuga, who is still the head. The party platform includes opposition to mass immigration and Islam in Australia, and support of Australia leaving the United Nations. The party ran candidates at the 2019 Australian federal election in Queensland, New South Wales and Tasmania, but failed to win any seats.

The party was de-registered on 12 January 2022.

==== Fraser Anning's Conservative National Party (2019–2020) ====
Fraser Anning's Conservative National Party was a populist, far-right, white nationalist party founded by Fraser Anning in April 2019, when he was a senator for Queensland. Anning had previously been a senator for Pauline Hanson's One Nation and Katter's Australian Party, and sat as an independent before founding the new party. The party contested the 2019 federal election, but failed to win a seat. The party was deregistered on 23 September 2020.

=== Other groups ===
Another extremist group mentioned in connection with infiltration to the NSW Young Nationals in 2018 (see below) is Squadron 88.

There was a small group called Identity Australia that was formed around March 2019, which described itself as "a youth-focused identitiarian organisation dedicated to giving European Australians a voice and restoring Australia's European character", and published a manifesto detailing its beliefs, but its website was as of April 2021 non-operational.

Other potentially violent groups active in Australia include the Southern Cross Hammerskins and the Crazy Whiteboys. The latter is a violent anti-Asian, antisemitic and anti-African Australian group (also described as skinhead) founded in 2009 in Melbourne. Two of their members were given jail sentences after a particularly vicious and brutal attack on an Asian student in 2012.

Other far-right groups whose profiles have varied include the Nationalist Australian Alternative, Australian Traditionalism, and the New National Action.

There is some cross-over between the two groups which call themselves Freemen on the Land (FOTL) and Sovereign Citizens (and some others), but both have their roots in the American farm crisis and the US/Canadian financial crisis of the 1980s, and their core beliefs may be broadly defined as "see[ing] the state as a corporation with no authority over free citizens". In 2011, Malcolm Roberts wrote a letter to then Prime Minister Julia Gillard filled with characteristic sovereign citizen ideas, but denied that he was a "sovereign citizen". There have been several court cases testing this concept, none successful for the "freemen". In 2015, the New South Wales Police Force identified "sovereign citizens" as a potential terrorist threat, estimating that there were about 300 sovereign citizens in the state at the time. There have been a few minor cases where parties have invoked arguments surrounding the "sovereign man", but the arguments have failed. Sovereign Citizens from the US have undertaken speaking tours to New Zealand and Australia, with some support among farmers struggling with drought and other hardships. A group called United Rights Australia (U R Australia) has a Facebook presence, and there are other websites promulgating Freemen/Sovereign Citizen ideas. From the 2010s, there has been a growing number of Freemen targeting Indigenous Australians, with groups with names like Tribal Sovereign Parliament of Gondwana Land, the Original Sovereign Tribal Federation (OSTF) and the Original Sovereign Confederation. Some proponents have conflated sovereign state beliefs with the land rights movement.

The new Australian Natives' Association (ANA), according to its Charter of Principles, is for "the cultivation of an Australian sentiment based on the maintenance of European-descent ethnic homogeneity; the development in Australia of a self-reliant ethnocentric community existing in parallel to preexisting institutions; and the promotion in Australia of patriarchal family order."

The National Workers Alliance (NWA) describes itself as an "Australian Nationalist Organisation for the preservation of western culture and identity".

== Terminology and media ==
The Noticer news website, which launched in early 2024, promises "unbiased" news; its subtitle reads "We notice what other news sites don't". The term noticer originated in far-right circles in the US, referring to someone who subscribes to "race science" (a belief that biology underlies racial differences, with whites being superior). In 2023 American far-right writer Steve Sailer published an anthology titled Noticing.

The Noticer promotes neo-Nazi ideologies, and is popular with National Socialist Network followers. It has published several opinion pieces by prominent neo-Nazi Joel Davis, and others such as NSN leader Thomas Sewell and American white supremacist Jared Taylor have also featured on the site. The website's owners and financial backers are not shown. It purports not to be affiliated with any ideology or movement, but often publishes content relating to extreme-right views, hidden among other news items so that readers do not immediately realise its leaning. It publishes many crime stories, particularly about offences allegedly committed by people of colour. In the lead-up to the 2025 Australian election, candidates and elected officials have shared content from the website, including Senator Ralph Babet, Trumpet of Patriots leader Suellen Wrightson, Family First leader Lyle Shelton, and candidates from both Pauline Hanson's One Nation and the Libertarian Party. Google has started removing ads from pages that breach its policy.

== Incidents ==
=== Bendigo mosque protests (2014–2015) ===
In 2014 the City of Greater Bendigo announced the construction of a A$3m mosque and Islamic community centre in Bendigo, Victoria. Some residents created a "Stop the Mosque in Bendigo" group, and certain far-right organisations, in particular the Q Society, mobilised residents and brought in outsiders to oppose the construction by conducting extensive protests. In October 2015, around 1,000 people turned up for a protest organised by the United Patriots Front. Members of the extremist group Right Wing Resistance Australia travelled from interstate, and the Rise Up Australia Party was also represented.

=== Infiltration of the Young Nationals (2018) ===
In 2018, it was revealed that the NSW Young Nationals had been infiltrated by a significant number of neo-Nazis and other far-right extremists. Party leader Michael McCormack denounced these attempts, and the leader of the NSW Nationals, John Barilaro, also denounced racism and fascism within the party. The suspected neo-Nazis were expelled from the party and its youth wing. Several of the men who infiltrated the organisation were from the New Guard (see above). The 19 members expelled from the party also included members of the Lads Society, Antipodean Resistance, Squadron 88, and the Dingoes.

=== Christchurch mosque shootings (2019) ===
Australian far-right terrorist Brenton Harrison Tarrant committed the March 2019 mosque shootings at Al Noor Mosque and Linwood Islamic Centre in Christchurch, New Zealand, killing 51 people and injuring 50 more. Tarrant had expressed support for two Australian far-right organizations, the United Patriots Front and the True Blue Crew online, and repeatedly praised Blair Cottrell, a neo-Nazi and former leader of the UPF, affectionately calling him "Emperor Blair Cottrell" during a celebration of Donald Trump being elected as President of the United States in 2016; he also donated money to the UPF.

=== Grampians neo-Nazi trip (2021) ===
On the Australia Day weekend in January 2021, the National Socialist Network, a new group created by members of the Antipodean Resistance and the Lads Society under Lads leader Thomas Sewell, were observed parading Nazi paraphernalia and harassing bystanders at several locations around the Grampians in Victoria. One Halls Gap resident said: "There were 40 white males, many with skinheads, some chanting 'white power'". They were reported to have chanted "sieg heil" and "white power", burnt a cross, and posted stickers saying "Australia For The White Man".

Concerned citizens reported them to police, who confronted the group and later collected video evidence from security videos. Victoria Police's Counter Terrorism Command and ASIO were notified, and the incident was widely covered in the media. One antisemitism expert called for the group to be branded a terrorist group, saying "We know that there is a direct link between incitement, between vilification ... and shooting rampages that we saw not just in Christchurch, but in other places".

=== March for Australia rallies (2025–2026) ===
On 31 August 2025 members of the National Socialist Network and various white supremacy groups participated in March for Australia anti-immigration rallies in Australian capital cities. National Socialist Network leader and known Neo-Nazi Thomas Sewell, along with various other far-right figures addressed protestors in all major cities calling for an end to immigration in the country. The rallies included at least one supporter of accused perpetrator of the Porepunkah police shootings and self-proclaimed Sovereign citizen Dezi Freeman. National Socialist Network members participated in chants of "Heil Australia" and members of white supremacist groups advocated for "returning Australia to a white Australia". Members of the NSN engaged in brawls with pro-Palestine counter-protestors and led a violent attack on Camp Sovereignty.

Further March for Australia rallies were held on 19 October 2025, 26 January 2026, and 30 August 2026, albeit with less attendance than the August 2025 rally.

== Individuals ==
- Fraser Anning (born 1949), former Senator for Queensland (2017–2019) and One Nation member; founder of Fraser Anning's Conservative National Party.
- William Baylebridge (1883–1942), writer and poet, later associated with Stephensen's Australia First Movement.
- Joh Bjelke-Petersen (1911–2005), former Premier of Queensland and leader of the Queensland National Party (1968–1987).
- Eric Butler (1916–2006), founder of the Australian League of Rights.
- Cailen Cambeul (born 1969), co-founder of the Creativity Alliance related to the Creativity Movement.
- Eric Campbell (1893–1970), Chief Commander of the New Guard, Leader of the Centre Party.
- Graeme Campbell (1939–2025), MP (1980–1998) former Labor and One Nation member, founder of Australia First Party.
- Ralph Cerminara, founder of Australian Defence League (ADL).
- Blair Cottrell (born 1989), founding member of United Patriots Front (UPF) and the Lads Society.
- Neil Erikson (born 1985), founding member of United Patriots Front (UPF) and the Lads Society.
- Phillip Galea, former member of the True Blue Crew (TBC); convicted of planning a terrorist attack in 2019.
- Pauline Hanson (born 1954), founder of One Nation, Senator for Queensland (2016–present).
- Jacob Hersant (born 1998/1999), first person to be charged and convicted of publicly making a Nazi salute in the state of Victoria. Former leader of the National Socialist Network.
- George Hodges Knox (1885–1960), former Nationalist Party, United Australia Party and Liberal Party member, Deputy Chief Commander of the New Guard.
- Danny Nalliah (born 1964), founder and leader of Rise Up Australia.
- Adela Pankhurst (1885–1961), former communist and suffragette turned fascist, co-founder of the fascist Australia First Movement.
- Drew Pavlou (born 1999), anti-China and anti-communist activist.
- Malcolm Roberts (born 1955), Senator for Queensland with One Nation (2016–2017; 2019–present), conspiracy theorist.
- Jim Saleam (born 1955), founder of National Action, former National Socialist Party of Australia and One Nation member, leader of Australia First Party.
- Thomas Sewell (born 1993), leader of the National Socialist Network (NSN).
- P. R. Stephensen (1901–1965), co-founder of the fascist Australia First Movement.
- Brenton Harrison Tarrant (born 1990), white nationalist neo-fascist far-right terrorist responsible for the Christchurch mosque shootings in Christchurch, New Zealand.
- Jack van Tongeren (born 1947), founder of the Australian Nationalist Movement.
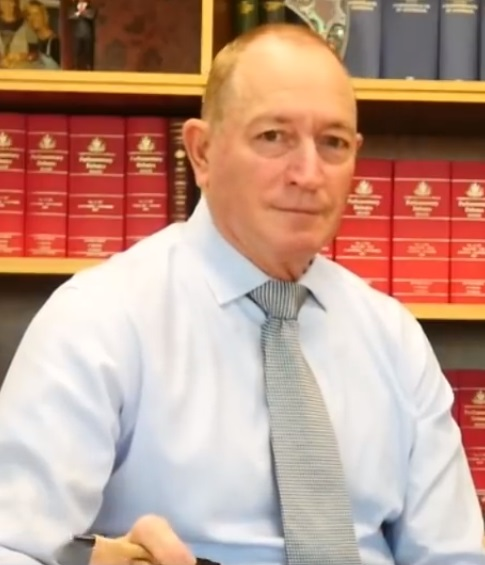
Fraser Anning

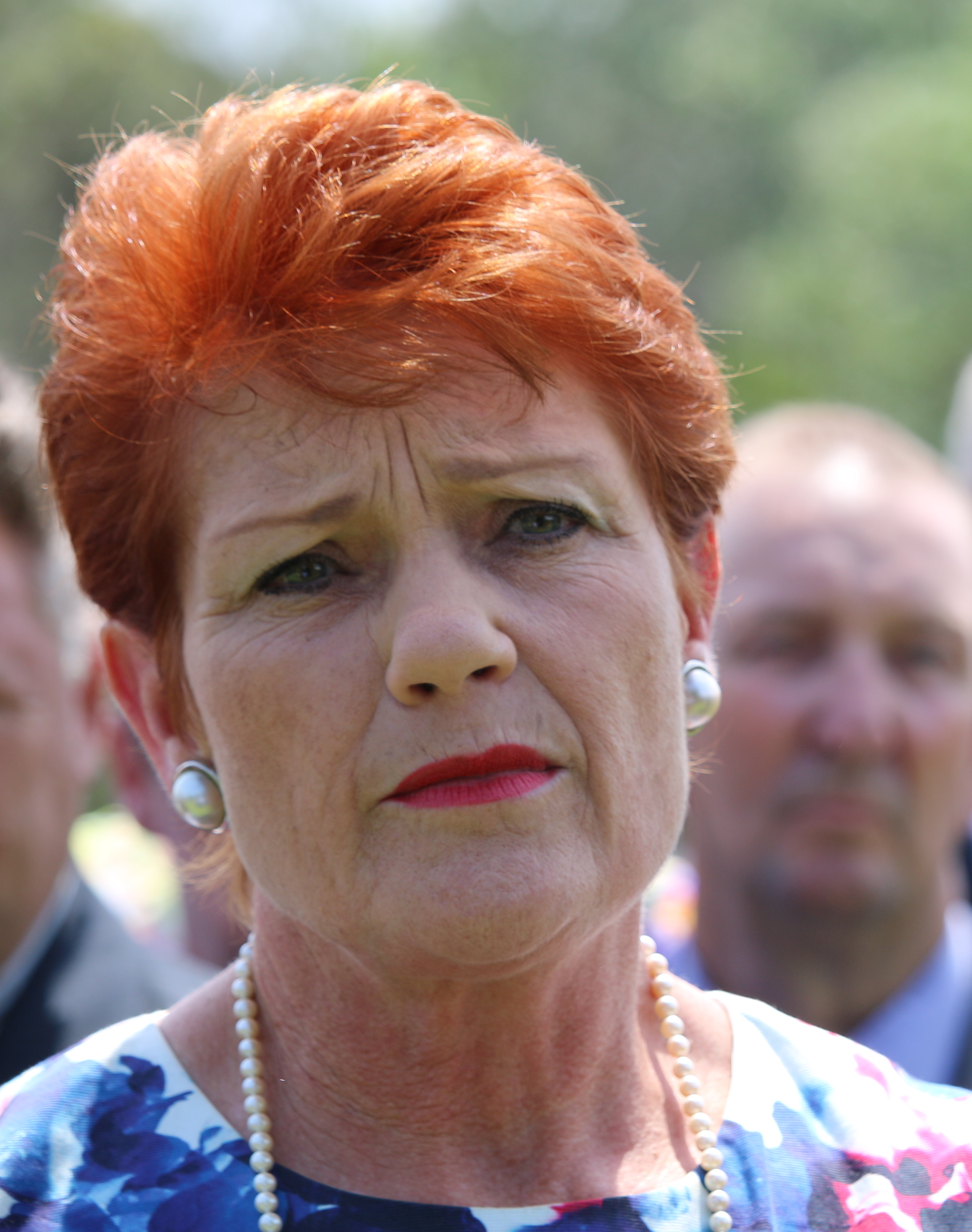
Pauline Hanson

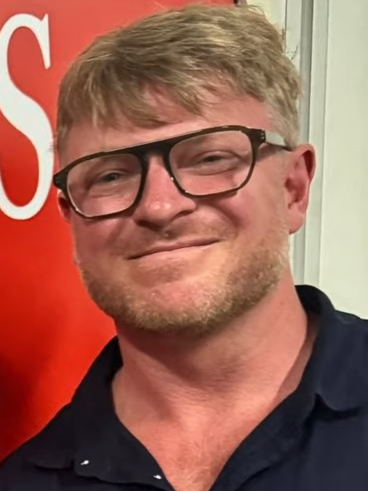
Blair Cottrell

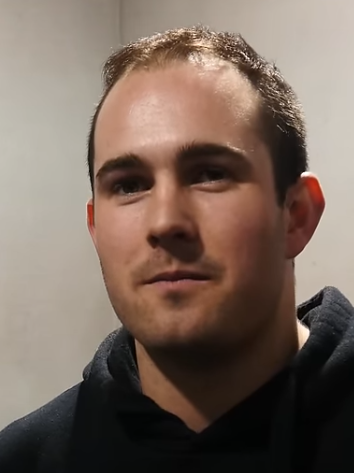
Thomas Sewell

== Election results ==
Year	Candidate(s)	Votes	%	Rank
1970	National Socialist	24,017	0.43	9th
Total		24,017	0.43	Lost
1974	National Socialist	1,810	0.03	10th
Total		1,810	0.03	Lost
1980	Progressive Conservative	6,247	0.07	11th
1980	National Front	1,467	0.01	12th
Total		7,714	0.08	Lost
1990	Australians Against Further Immigration	19,439	0.20	11th
Total		19,439	0.20	Lost
1993	Confederate Action	59,875	0.56	6th
1993	Australians Against Further Immigration	46,857	0.44	7th
Total		106,732	1.0	Lost
1996	Australians Against Further Immigration	137,604	1.26	5th
1996	Reclaim Australia	44,545	0.41	9th
Total		182,149	1.67	Lost
1998	One Nation	1,007,439	8.99	3rd
1998	Australia First	46,765	0.41	8th
1998	Reclaim Australia	8,019	0.07	19th
Total		1,062,223	9.47	Lost
2001	One Nation	644,364	5.54	4th
2001	Australians Against Further Immigration	21,012	0.18	15th
Total		665,376	5.72	Lost
2004	One Nation	206,455	1.73	6th
2004	Australians Against Further Immigration	11,508	0.10	21st
Total		217,963	1.83	Lost
2007	Pauline's United Australia Party	141,268	1.12	6th
2007	One Nation	52,708	0.42	12th
Total		193,976	1.54	Lost
2010	One Nation	70,672	0.56	11th
2010	Australia First	9,680	0.08	22nd
Total		80,352	0.64	Lost
2013	One Nation	70,851	0.53	16th
2013	Rise Up Australia	49,341	0.37	20th
2013	Australia First	10,157	0.08	32nd
2013	Australian Protectionist	3,379	0.03	42nd
Total		133,728	1.01	Lost
2016	One Nation	593,013	4.29	4th
2016	Liberty Alliance	102,982	0.74	12th
2016	Rise Up Australia	36,424	0.26	25th
2016	Australia First	3,005	0.02	47th
Total		735,424	5.31	Lost
2019	One Nation	788,203	5.40	4th
2019	Conservative National	94,130	0.64	14th
2019	Rise Up Australia	64,344	0.44	15th
2019	Great Australian	34,199	0.23	24th
2019	Love Australia or Leave	10,099	0.07	38th
2019	Yellow Vest Australia	3,263	0.02	49th
Total		994,238	6.81	Lost
2022	One Nation	644,744	4.29	4th
2022	Great Australian	82,237	0.55	10th
Total		726,981	4.84	Lost
2025	One Nation	991,814	6.40	4th
2025	People First	71,892	0.46	
Total		1,063,706	6.86	Lost

== See also ==
- Australian nationalism
- Depends What You Mean by Extremist, a 2017 book by John Safran
- Far-right politics
- Far-right terrorism in Australia
- Islamophobia in Australia
- List of white nationalist organizations
- Politics in Australia
- Racism in Australia
- Romper Stomper, a 1992 film about neo-Nazi skinheads in Australia
- Romper Stomper (TV series), a 2018 sequel to the film
- Ustaše in Australia
- Far-right politics in New Zealand

== Sources ==
=== Books ===
- Ó Maoláin, Ciarán (1987). "Australia". The Radical right: a world directory. Harlow, GB Santa Barbara, Calif: Longman ABC-Clio. pp. 10–17. ISBN 0-582-90270-3.
- Amos, Keith (1976). The New Guard Movement 1931–1935. Melbourne: Melbourne University Press. ISBN 978-0-522-84092-6.
- Campbell, Andrew (1978). The Australian League of Rights: a study in political extremism and subversion. Collingwood: Outback Press. ISBN 978-0-86888-222-2.
- Cathcart, Michael (1988). Defending the National Tuckshop: Australia's Secret Army Intrigue of 1931. Melbourne: McPhee Gribble Publishers. ISBN 978-0-86914-077-2.
- Clune, David (2009). The Governors of New South Wales 1788–2010. Annandale, NSW: Federation Press. ISBN 978-1-86287-743-6.
- Fleming, Andy; Mondon, Aurelien (2018). "The Radical Right in Australia". In Rydgren, Jens (ed.). The Oxford Handbook of the Radical Right. Oxford University Press.
- Goodrick-Clarke, Nicholas (2012). "Neonazismus in den USA". Im Schatten der Schwarzen Sonne (in German). Wiesbaden: Marixverlag. pp. 85–86. ISBN 978-3-8438-0170-6.
- Greason, David (1994). I was a teenage fascist. McPhee Gribble. ISBN 978-0-86914-285-1.
- Hagan, Jim (1991). A History of the Labor Party in New South Wales, 1891–1991. Melbourne: Longman Cheshire. ISBN 978-0-582-86969-1.
- Moore, Andrew (1989). The Secret Army and the Premier: Conservative Paramilitary Organisations in New South Wales 1930–32. Kensington, NSW: New South Wales University Press. ISBN 978-0-86840-283-3.
- Moore, Andrew (1995). The Right Road: A history of Right-wing Politics in Australia. Oxford University Press. ISBN 978-0-19-553512-9.
- Muirden, Bruce (1968). The Puzzled Patriots: The Story of the Australia First Movement. Melbourne University Press. ISBN 978-0-522-83907-4.
- Nairn, Bede (1986). The "Big Fella": Jack Lang and the Australian Labor Party 1891–1949. Carlton, VIC: Melbourne University Press. ISBN 978-0-522-84406-1.
- Nilan, Pam (2019). "Far-Right Contestation in Australia: Soldiers of Odin and True Blue Crew". In Peucker, Mario; Smith, Debra (eds.). The Far-Right in Contemporary Australia. Springer Singapore. pp. 101–125. doi:10.1007/978-981-13-8351-9_5. ISBN 978-981-13-8350-2. S2CID 199297174 – via ResearchGate (by request).
- Persian, Jayne (2024). Fascists in exile: post-war displaced persons in Australia. London; New York: Routledge, Taylor & Francis Group. ISBN 978-0-367-22794-4.
- Peucker, Mario; Smith, Debra, eds. (2019). The Far-Right in Contemporary Australia. Springer Singapore. doi:10.1007/978-981-13-8351-9. ISBN 978-981-13-8350-2. S2CID 211346468.
- Smith, Evan (2020a). "White Australia alone? The international links of the Australian far right in the Cold War era". In Geary, Daniel; Schofield, Camilla; Sutton, Jennifer (eds.). Global white nationalism: from apartheid to Trump. Manchester: Manchester University Press. ISBN 978-1526147066.
- Smith, Evan; Persian, Jayne; Fox, Vashti Jane, eds. (2023). Histories of fascism and anti-fascism in Australia. Routeldge. ISBN 978-0-367-63812-2. Archived from the original on 30 June 2026.
- Winter, Barbara (January 2005). The Australia First Movement. Interactive Publications. ISBN 978-1-876819-91-0.
- Wear, Rae (2006). Blamires, Cyprian P.; Jackson, Paul (eds.). World Fascism: A–K – Volume 1 of World Fascism: A Historical Encyclopedia. Santa Barbara, California: ABC-CLIO. p. 66. ISBN 978-1-57607-940-9.

=== Academic sources ===
- Alder, Baron (1991). More Dangerous Than All The Communists In Australia: A Study Of The Ideology Of The New Guard Movement 1931-1935 (Honours thesis). Sydney: University of Sydney.
- Cunningham, Matthew (2015). The reactionary and the radical: A comparative analysis of mass conservative mobilisation in Australia and New Zealand during the Great Depression (PhD thesis). Wellington: Te Herenga Waka—Victoria University of Wellington. doi:10.26686/wgtn.17011934.
- Bloch, Barbara (2005). Unsettling Zionism : diasporic consciousness and Australian Jewish identities (PDF) (Thesis). Sydney, Australia: Western Sydney University. Archived (PDF) from the original on 7 September 2025.
- Campion, Kristy (April 2019). "A 'Lunatic Fringe'? The Persistence of Right Wing Extremism in Australia" (PDF). Perspectives on Terrorism. 13 (2). ISSN 2334-3745. Archived (PDF) from the original on 7 January 2021.
- Dean, Geoff; Bell, Peter; Vakhitova, Zarina (October 2016). "Right-wing extremism in Australia: the rise of the new radical right". Journal of Policing, Intelligence and Counter Terrorism. 11 (2): 121–142. doi:10.1080/18335330.2016.1231414. S2CID 151616050.
- Saleam, James (1999). The Other Radicalism: An Inquiry Into Contemporary Australian Extreme Right Ideology, Politics And Organization 1975–1995 (PDF) (Thesis). Sydney, Australia: Fisher Library, University of Sydney. Archived (PDF) from the original on 16 September 2017.
- Smith, Evan (11 September 2020). "Keeping the Nazi Menace Out: George Lincoln Rockwell and the Border Control System in Australia and Britain in the Early 1960s". Social Sciences. 9 (9): 158. doi:10.3390/socsci9090158.
- Whitford, Troy (April 2011). "A political history of National Action: Its fears, ideas, tactics and conflicts". Rural Society. 20 (2): 216–226. doi:10.5172/rsj.20.2.216. ISSN 2204-0536.

=== Online sources ===
- Cathcart, Michael (16 March 2017). "The White Army: Fascism in Australia in the 1930s" (Audio). ABC Radio (Interview). Nightlife. Interviewed by Clark, Philip. Archived from the original on 16 August 2021.
- Fellner, Carrie (22 March 2019). "Right wing extremist makes election bid in sleepy NSW 'cherry capital'". The Sydney Morning Herald. Archived from the original on 5 April 2019.
- "Writing About the Extreme Right in Australia". History Cooperative. 2005. "The only overview of Australian right-wing extremism is the slim volume, The Right Road? by Andrew Moore which was published nearly ten years ago [1995]."
- Strømmen, Øyvind (20 October 2015). "Fear, loathing and factions". Hate Speech International.
- "Anti-immigrants with a green tinge". The Sydney Morning Herald. 21 March 2003. Archived from the original on 26 April 2021.
- Hannan, Ewin; Baker, Richard (13 December 2005). "Nationalists boast of their role on the beach". The Age. Archived from the original on 19 October 2025.
