= List of white nationalist organizations =

The following is the list of well-known white nationalist organizations, groups and related media.

White nationalism is a political ideology which advocates a racial definition of national identity for white people; some white nationalists advocate a separate all-white nation state. White separatism and white supremacism are subgroups within white nationalism. The former seek a separate white nation state, while the latter add ideas from social Darwinism and National Socialism to their ideology. A few white nationalist organization leaders claim that they are mostly separatists, and only a smaller number are supremacists. Both schools of thought generally avoid the term supremacy, saying it has negative connotations.

== Africa ==
=== South Africa ===
- Afrikaner Weerstandsbeweging, (English: Afrikaner Resistance Movement) (AWB) is a South African far-right secessionist political organisation. The AWB is committed to the creation of an independent Boer-Afrikaner republic or "Volkstaat/Boerestaat" in South Africa.
- Blanke Bevrydingsbeweging (English: White Liberation Movement) (BBB). The BBB, founded in 1985 and banned under the Apartheid regime in 1988, sought a white South Africa by the removal of the black population.
- Herstigte Nasionale Party (English: Reconstituted National Party). A far-right party supporting Afrikaner nationalism and a return to apartheid.

=== Zimbabwe ===
- Rhodesian Front
- Rhodesian White People's Party (1976) banned

== Europe ==
=== Finland ===
- Nordic Resistance Movement, largest modern neo-Nazi group in Finland, tied to multiple murders, for which it was eventually outlawed.
- Soldiers of Odin, anti-immigration vigilante group founded by an NRM member.

=== United Kingdom ===
- Blood & Honour is a neo-Nazi music promotion network and political group founded in 1987 with links to Combat 18 and composed of white power skinheads and other white nationalists. The group organizes white power concerts by Rock Against Communism bands and distributes a magazine with the same name.
- British National Party is a far-right political party formed as a splinter group from the British National Front by John Tyndall in 1982. The BNP restricted membership to people it referred to as "Indigenous Caucasian", effectively excluding non-whites, until 2009 when its constitution was challenged in the courts on grounds of racial discrimination.
- British Movement is a former British far-right white nationalist political party formed in 1968 by far-right politician Colin Jordan. The party became defunct after 1983 and became a political campaigning organisation, supporting white nationalism and anti-immigration.
- National Front, a small far-right party which was more prominent in the 1970s.
- Patriotic Alternative is a British far-right white nationalist political organisation formed in September 2019 by Mark Collett, a former member of the British National Party

== The Americas ==
=== North America ===
==== United States ====
- Aryan Republican Army (ARA) was a white nationalist terrorist organization which espoused Christian Identity.
- Council of Conservative Citizens, an American political organization which supports a large variety of conservative and paleoconservative causes in addition to white separatism.
- EURO, is a white separatist organization in the United States. Led by former Louisiana state representative, presidential primary candidate and Grand Wizard of the KKK David Duke, it was founded in 2000.
- Goyim Defense League and video channel GoyimTV, an antisemitism group run by Jon Minadeo II.
- Identity Evropa was an American neo-Nazi and white supremacist organization which was established in March 2016.
- National Policy Institute, was a think tank based in Augusta, Georgia, in the United States. It describes itself as the right's answer to the Southern Poverty Law Center.
- Pacifica Forum, was a controversial discussion group in Eugene, Oregon, United States. It has been listed as a white nationalist hate group by the Southern Poverty Law Center (SPLC).
- Patriot Front is a neo-fascist and american nationalist group and is an offshoot of Vanguard America.
- The Social Contract Press, a publisher of white nationalist literature which was founded by John Tanton.

==== Canada ====
- Western Canada for Us, was a short-lived Alberta-based white nationalist group founded by Glenn Bahr and Peter Kouba in early 2004.

== Oceania ==
=== Australia ===
- Antipodean Resistance (2016–2018)
- Australians Against Further Immigration (1989–2008)
- Australia First Party
  - Patriotic Youth League (defunct; reconstituted as Eureka Youth League)
- Australian Nationalist Movement (WA, 1980s)
- Australian National Socialist Party (founded 1962, merged into National Socialist Party of Australia)
- Fraser Anning's Conservative National Party (2019–2020)
- Southern Cross Hammerskins
- National Action (Australia) (1980s)
- National Socialist Network (2020–2026)
- National Socialist Party of Australia (1968–1970s)
- Reclaim Australia (2015–2017)
- Right Wing Resistance Australia
- True Blue Crew (2015–2016)
- United Patriots Front (2015–2019)

=== New Zealand ===
- New Zealand National Front (formed 1977)
- Right Wing Resistance
- Action Zealandia

== Media ==
=== White nationalist web forums ===
- The Daily Stormer, a Neo-Nazi, antisemitic online newspaper which is named after the Nazi tabloid Der Stürmer.
- Iron March, a defunct fascist forum known for spawning multiple militant groups.
- Podblanc, a now defunct antisemitic and white supremacist video sharing website. Its founder, Craig Cobb, designed it as an alternative to YouTube, which Cobb calls "Jew Tube" due to its policy of banning racist and antisemitic content.
- Stormfront is an antisemitic and white nationalist Internet forum.
- Redwatch, a now defunct British neo-Nazi and anti semitic website.
- Vanguard News Network, an antisemitic and white supremacist website.
- VDARE, an anti-immigration and white supremacist website.

=== White nationalist radio shows ===
- The Don and Derek Black Show was a white nationalist radio program which was broadcast five times a week from the Lake Worth, Florida-based radio station WPBR-AM. Adrianne Black (then Derek) is the daughter of Don Black, the founder of the white nationalist forum Stormfront. Adrianne renounced white supremacy in 2013.
- Hal Turner ran the now defunct Hal Turner Radio Network and website.

== See also ==
- Ethnic party
- Antisemitism
- Far-right politics
- Nationalism
- Right-wing populism
