= Australian National Socialist Party =

- Leader: Ted Cawthron; Don Lindsay; Arthur Smith
- Founded: 1962
- Dissolved: 1968
- Succeeded by: National Socialist Party of Australia
- Headquarters: Sydney, Australia
- Ideology: Neo-Nazism; White supremacism Australian nationalism Holocaust denial Anti-communism; Anti-immigration; Anti-multiculturalism; Antisemitism
- Political position: Far-right

The Australian National Socialist Party (ANSP) was a minor Australian Neo-Nazi party that was formed in 1962. It merged into the National Socialist Party of Australia, which was originally a splinter group, in 1968.

== Formation ==
The Australian National Socialist Party was launched in 1962 by University of Adelaide physics student Ted Cawthron and Sydney council worker Don Lindsay. They were vigorously anti-communist, and argued for the perpetuation of the White Australia policy, a defensive approach to Asia and the total annexation of New Guinea.

The party consisted entirely of Cawthron and Lindsay until they were joined in July 1963 by Arthur Smith, known for his outward antisemitism and aggressive tactics. He was a prominent figure in the Australian Nationalist Workers' Party, an attempted continuation of the "Australian Party" founded in September 1955 by right-wing journalist Frank Browne and disbanded in September 1957. Browne's party never had a serious following, though the party received some media attention and generally advocated far-right positions.

Smith was the party's first leader, who managed to slightly increase membership by merging with a host of other motley white supremacist groups in Melbourne. In 1964, a tiny Victorian group, the Australian National Renaissance Party, was incorporated into the ANSP. Its total membership remained very small, although it received substantial publicity from a report by the Australian Broadcasting Corporation's Four Corners, which broadcast the proceedings of a general meeting and prompted calls for Neo-Nazism to be banned.

== Decline ==
The ANSP's headquarters were raided by police on 26 June 1964, during which Smith and four other party members were arrested. The five were charged with a variety of offenses, with Smith convicted of possessing unlicensed firearms and explosives and possession of stolen goods; he served a six-month jail term. While Smith was imprisoned, Robert Pope, who had led the Australian National Renaissance Party, became acting leader, but the party's membership had collapsed following the raid. Attorney-General Billy Snedden told parliament that the party was under surveillance and probably had a membership of fewer than 100. Pope had Smith expelled from the party while he was in prison, and by late 1964 the party was essentially moribund.

Throughout 1965, Smith was engaged in re-launching the ANSP. In early 1966, Smith attracted media attention when he collapsed while speaking at the Domain. Several poorly frequented demonstrations were held in support of the Vietnam War. The party again went into remission when Smith returned to his native Tasmania, but it re-emerged in June 1967 with anti-communist and anti-Semitic demonstrations. At this point, Cawthron and several other defectors formed the competing National Socialist Party of Australia (NSPA), which rejected the radicalism of the ANSP.

In May 1968, Smith resigned from the party and retired from politics, leaving the leadership to Eric Wenberg, a long-term party member and militarist. Wenberg made overtures to Cawthron, and the ANSP was merged into the NSPA.

== See also ==
- Australia First Party
- Australia First Movement
- Far-right politics in Australia
- National Socialist Party of Australia
- National Action (Australia)
- Antisemitism in Australia
