= Jack van Tongeren =

Australian terrorist

Peter Joseph Van Tongeren
- Born: 14 December 1947 (age 78); Netherlands
- Other name: Jack van Tongeren
- Known for: Arson attacks against Asian-owned businesses, distribution of anti-Asian flyers
- Parent(s): Rudi van Tongeren; Stella van Tongeren
- Allegiance: Australian Nationalist Movement (1985–2007)
- Motive: white supremacist ideology
- Convictions: arson, assault, theft, conspiracy
- Penalty: 18-year sentence (1989); 2-year suspended sentence (2006)
- Accomplice: John Van Blitterswyk

Details
- Span of crimes: 1985–2004
- Country: Australia
- State: Western Australia
- Targets: 6+ restaurants arsoned 1+ restaurant fire-bombed
- Date apprehended: August 1989, 2004
- Military career
- Allegiance: Australia
- Branch: Australian Army
- Service years: 1971–1975
- Unit: 6 Platoon, B Company, 2 RAR/NZ
- Conflicts: Vietnam War

Peter Joseph "Jack" van Tongeren (/væn ˈtɒŋərən/ van TONG-ər-ən, Dutch: [ˈpeːtər ˈjoːzə fɑn ˈtɔŋərə(n)]; (Note: In isolation, Joseph and van are pronounced [ˈjoːzəf] and [vɑn].) born 14 December 1947) is the former leader of the West Australian Neo-Nazi group Australian Nationalist Movement (ANM), a white supremacist and far-right group, and a successor organisation called the Australian Nationalist Worker's Union (ANWU). In the late 1980s it was revealed that his father had part-Javanese ancestry. He served 13 years, one month, and six days in prison from 1989 to 2002 for theft and arson, having robbed and firebombed businesses owned by Asians in Western Australia. Nevertheless, Van Tongeren resumed anti-Asian activities upon his release in 2002, leading to further convictions, in 2006, following which he left Western Australia.

== Biography ==
Peter Joseph van Tongeren was born in the Netherlands on 14 December 1947 to a father of Dutch-Javanese descent, Rudi, and an Australian mother, Stella. The family later migrated to Australia. He joined the Australian army and saw action in Vietnam in 1971. Following his military service he travelled throughout Australia from 1979 to 1983 associating with a variety of far-right groups such as the South Australia League of Rights, the Tasmanian branch of the Anglo-Saxon Keltic Society (ASKS), the Sydney based group National Action (NA) and the Los Angeles-based neo-Nazi American Worker's Party.

== Australian Nationalist Movement ==
Van Tongeren's involvement with NA led to his running, unsuccessfully, for the Senate in the 1984 election on an independent ticket, attaining just 861 votes (0.11%). He attempted to gain control of the NA, but when this failed, van Tongeren split from the group and in April 1985 formed his own organisation, the Australian Nationalist Movement (ANM).The ANM was formed in Perth, but soon afterwards gathered membership in the other Australian states. Van Tongeren styled himself as the organisation's "supreme leader", with John van Blitterswyk as second-in-command, Russell Willey as third-in-command and treasurer; other prominent members were Christoper Bartle, Wayne van Blitterswyk, Judith Lyons and Mark Ferguson.

There was also an attempt to set up a parallel group to the ANM, called the Australian Aryan Army (AAA), with John van Blitterswyk as the nominal "Commander". The ANM was conceived as the political branch of van Tongeren's organisation, with the AAA as its paramilitary and terrorist branch (a structure modelled on the Irish separatist groups of Sinn Féin and its paramilitary counterpart, the Irish Republican Army). A training facility for members was set up on a property east of Perth called 'Bindoon', containing a shelter, lookout and rifle range. In reality, however, the AAA "never moved beyond the conceptual stage".

ANM's initial actions involved an extensive flyer-distribution campaign in Perth of more than 400,000 photocopied posters. The crude posters and fliers bore repetitive messages that included phrases such as "No Asians", "White Revolution The Only Solution", "Coloured Immigration: Trickle Is Now A Flood" and "Asians Out Or Racial War" and brought the organisation to the attention of the public. ANM is believed to have had approximately 100 loosely-affiliated members by the mid-1980s.

By 1988, ANM turned towards identifying with international neo-Nazi ideology with public expressions of Antisemitism and holocaust denial.

== Commencement of criminal activities (1988-1989) ==
ANM's criminal activity may have commenced in February 1988 when a member of the group's home was arsoned in a failed attempt at insurance fraud. ANM then turned towards arsoning and fire-bombing Asian-owned businesses with the intention of intimidating Asians and inciting a race war. Between September 1988 and May 1989, five restaurants were arsoned, and one was bombed leading to community tensions, vigilantism, and a decline in Asian investment.

The Western Australian government responded with a 1989 amendment to the Criminal Code to criminalise the possession, publication and display of written or pictorial material that is threatening or abusive with the intention of inciting racial hatred or of harassing a racial group. Penalties ranged between six months and two years imprisonment. The emphasis on written and pictorial material was a direct response to the racist poster campaigns of the Australian Nationalist Movement.

=== Arrests (1989-1990) ===
Short on cash, ANM turned to theft, stealing an estimated $800,000 in goods during a series of warehouse robberies. They also bashed a left-wing anti-racist campaigner in a home invasion. A tip-off to the police led them to the location where ANM's stolen goods were being stored and the arrest of Van Tongeren's associates, Russell Willey and John van Blitterswyk. Willey turned informant and collected recordings of the group's leadership leading to their arrest in August 1989.

Following the arrest, two other members of ANM suspected fellow member David Locke to be a police informant and lured him into a park in the suburb of Gosnells where he was beaten with iron bars and his throat slit.

=== Criminal convictions (1990) ===
The murder trial of the two men in June 1990 led to the trial of Van Tongeren and the five other ANM members being aborted due to the media atmosphere at the time. At a second trial in August 1990, six members of ANM were found guilty, with Van Tongeren was sentenced to 18 years on 53 counts. Van Tongeren was sentenced in absentia due to a hunger strike that commenced a few days into the trial. The two men who murdered David Locke received life sentences.

Willey would later participate in the filming of a documentary about the ANM, Nazi Supergrass, in 1993. According to van Tongeren, Willey only joined the ANM in order to further his own interests in crime and did not care for white nationalism.

== Australian Nationalist Worker's Union ==
=== Release from prison ===
Van Tongeren expressed no remorse following his release from Karnet Prison Farm in September 2002. His first public statement accused the Western Australian premier Geoff Gallop and Attorney General Jim McGinty of pandering to the Asian minority. He also denied being a terrorist. He soon formed a successor organisation to the ANM called the Australian Nationalist Worker's Union, and expressed interest in seeking election. Banned under Western Australian law from running for state parliament, Van Tongeren was free to run for a seat in the federal parliament. This led to the Attorney-General calling on the Commonwealth Government to tighten laws on the eligibility of convicted criminals.

=== Resumption of racist attacks ===
In February 2004 three Chinese restaurants in Perth were firebombed in the early hours of the morning. Other Asian-owned shops and synagogues were plastered with posters and daubed with swastikas. Van Tongeren denied responsibility, instead claiming that the attacks must be the actions of angry Australians reacting against "Asian gangs and African crime." It was later reported that Van Tongeren instigated the attacks to drum up publicity for his book, The ANM Story, which had been written in 1991 but remained unpublished for thirteen years. Western Australian police launched "Operation Atlantic" in response to the attacks, leading to the arrest of five men involved in the attacks. The police also identified a plot to harm member of the Western Australian Legislative Assembly Jim McGinty and his family, two police officers and an ethnic community leader, and raided Van Tongeren's home. These threats led to Jim McGinty cancelling meetings in Adelaide and returning to Perth.

In August 2004 a week-long man-hunt for Van Tongeren ended with police receiving a tip-off that located him at an RSL club. Van Tongeren claimed to be innocent, and that he was only hiding from the police out of fear that they would shoot him. Following these arrests, the racist graffiti attacks around the Perth CBD ceased. In February 2006, Van Tongeren, out on bail pending his trial, failed to report to police and was believed to be at large and travelling with former ANM member Matthew Billing. On 23 March 2006, a letter was received by staff at ABC Television Studios, purporting to be from Van Tongeren. It claimed that charges against him were a conspiracy created by the WA Government, and indicated that they would need to be dropped by Attorney-General Jim McGinty, in order for Van Tongeren to return from hiding. A month later Van Tongeren and his co-accused Matthew Billing were found and arrested in the Boddington area south-east of Perth. Both men once again faced the courts over the 2004 arson plots.

During a hearing on 2 November, Van Tongeren collapsed, was taken to hospital, and later used a wheelchair. Van Tongeren was released from jail on the condition that he leave Western Australia. He currently resides in the eastern states. In 2007 the ANM/ANWU was reported to have been disbanded.

== Current residence ==
On 30 September 2023, Crispian Chan, an ethnic Chinese resident of Perth whose family's restaurant had been bombed by the ANM in the 1980s, published a podcast and article for the Australian Broadcasting Corporation. He documented tracking van Tongeren down, and locating his likely residence in South Australia. Further attempts to contact him directly led to the reporter being threatened by an associate of van Tongeren's. In his article, Chan compares van Tongeren to himself in the context of the two men's shared Asian heritage, and the fact that van Tongeren himself had suffered anti-Asian racism and bullying in his youth, citing an article written by Stella van Tongeren in 1990 talking about her son's childhood.

== See also ==
- Australia First Party
- Far-right politics in Australia
- Jim Saleam
- National Socialist Party of Australia
- List of white nationalist organizations
