= JVT =

JVT may refer to:

- Joint Video Team, providing Advanced Video Coding standards
- John Van Tongeren, American musician and composer
- Jack van Tongeren, Australian neo-Nazi
- Jonathan Van-Tam, British specialist in influenza and pandemic preparedness
- JVT, a 1955 car raced by Len Terry
