= Jim Saleam =

Australian nationalist activist (born 1955)

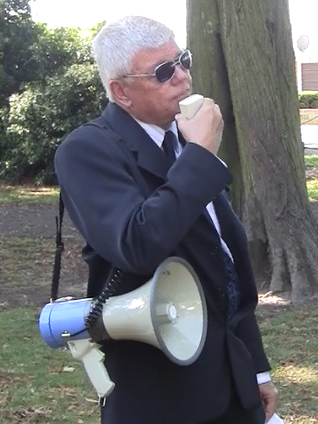
- Saleam at a nationalist rally in 2013

Chairman of the Australia First Party
- Incumbent
- Assumed office 18 July 2010
- Deputy Chairman: Peter Schuback
- Preceded by: Office established; Diane Teasdale (as President of the federal Australia First Party)

General Secretary of the Australia First Party
- In office 19 December 2002 – August 2007
- President: Diane Teasdale
- Preceded by: No immediate predecessor
- Succeeded by: No immediate successor

Leader of the National Action Party
- In office 25 April 1982 – 11 June 1997
- Deputy: Ross May
- Preceded by: Party established
- Succeeded by: Michael Brander

Deputy Leader of the National Socialist Party of Australia
- In office c. 1972 – 1975; Served with Ross May
- Leader: Ted Cawthron
- Preceded by: Frank Molnar
- Succeeded by: Party dissolved

Personal details
- Born: James Ernest Saleam; 18 September 1955 (age 71) Maryborough, Queensland, Australia
- Party: Australia First (2002–07; 2010–present)
- Other political affiliations: See list: National Socialist (until 1975); Independent (1975–82; 1999; 2002; 2007–10); National Action (1982–97); One Nation (1997–99); AAFI (1999–02)
- Spouse: Jane Mengler (m. 1987; div. 1994)
- Children: 2
- Occupation: Political scientist; academic; author; activist
- Known for: Far-right activism, founding National Action and Australia First Party
- Criminal information
- Criminal charges: Insurance fraud and property offences (1984); Accessory before the fact (1991)

Academic background
- Education: University of Sydney (PhD)
- Thesis: The Other Radicalism Inquiry Into Contemporary Australian, Extreme Right Ideology, Politics And Organisation 1975-1995 (1999)

James Ernest Saleam Jr. (/ˈseɪləm/; born 18 September 1955) is an Australian politician, academic, and far-right activist, currently serving as the chairman of the Australia First Party. He came to prominence after founding National Action, a militant white nationalist organization active in Sydney during the 1980s.

The son of Lebanese immigrants to Australia, Saleam attended Maryborough State High School, where he developed his interest in politics and nationalism. By 1970, he joined the National Socialist Party of Australia and two years later he was arrested for the fire-bombing of a Maoist bookshop. During the 70s, Saleam joined and founded minor nationalist organisations, and in 1982 he founded National Action.

Following the foundation of National Action, Saleam quickly gained national notoriety in the Australian nationalist scene. The organization advocated for a nationalist agenda and frequently engaged in tactics like direct action. National Action's activities often led to clashes with opposing groups and law enforcement. In 1989, while a member of said organization, Saleam was arrested for his involvement in orchestrating a shotgun attack on the home of an African National Congress representative in Australia.

Despite these setbacks, he continued to promote his nationalist ideology. In the late 1990s, after serving time in prison, Saleam obtained both an MA and PhD from the University of Sydney by writing two theses on the far-right in America and Australia. He would join the Australia First Party in 2002, where he worked as the secretary of the Sydney branch. By 2010, he became the chairman of the party. Under his leadership, the party has maintained a staunchly anti-immigration stance. Saleam has been a strong advocate of barring further immigration to preserve a "self-contained, predominantly white nation resistant to further immigration or watering-down of its culture", and has supported reintroducing the White Australia policy.

== Life ==
=== Early years: 1955–1972 ===
Saleam was born and raised in Maryborough, Queensland, 18 September 1955, to a family of Lebanese immigrants. His grandfather, George Saleam, was born in Lebanon and fled his country at age 16, boarding a ship bound for Australia. After arriving to Marybourgh, George was classed as a white person. Jim's parents divorced in the 1960s, when he was an eight-year-old. After the break-up, his mother left with his sister to another town, leaving Saleam with his father. Saleam has described his father as an apolitical person, being not "academically minded or interested in politics or history". However, he let his son read and study.

Saleam attended Maryborough State High School, which at the time worked as a segregated boys and girls high school. At the age of 15, Saleam developed his early interest in politics, writing to "every conceivable political organisation in the country", both from the left and the right. Malcolm Fraser's election as PM led towards his exposure to nationalism and far-right politics, after he realised "both sides were in cahoots and that there was a need for a radical third way". According to Dr. Michael Monsour, a local doctor from Saleam's hometown, he developed certain fascination with the Nazis and was controversial for painting swastikas and portraying the roman salute. Despite being a troublemaker, Saleam was also described as "academically gifted". His final school exams were passed with ease, earning him a scholarship to the University of Queensland.

In 1970, Saleam joined the National Socialist Party of Australia. His role as a regular contributor to party funding earned him the nickname of 'Comrade Saleam'. He became an assistant editor of Stormtrooper and the National Socialist Bulletin, where he often emphasised the 'socialism' in 'National Socialism'. As a NSPA militant, in 1972, Saleam firebombed a Maoist bookshop in Brisbane and, two years later, he was found guilty and arrested. His sentence banned him from having any association with the NSPA.

=== Political activism: 1974–1982 ===
After his release from prison, Saleam moved to Sydney and enrolled at the Sydney University. In 1975, in Brisbane, Saleam was pictured by an Australasian Spartacist photographer in an anti-Pinochet demonstration organized by the NSPA, wearing a swastika armband. According to him, he would join back to the NSPA but as an infiltrator as an attempt to prove the organization members were agents of the special branch of the Queensland police.

On Anzac Day 1982, he co-founded National Action (NA), which eventually collapsed due to Saleam's convictions for property offences and fraud in 1984, possession of a prohibited article - a large nail-studded club in 1985, and for organising a shotgun attack in 1989 on African National Congress Australian representative Eddie Funde, for which he served three and a half years in prison.

After his release from prison, Saleam was awarded a PhD in politics from the University of Sydney by writing a thesis entitled The Other Radicalism: An Inquiry into Contemporary Australian Extreme Right Ideology, Politics And Organization 1975–1995 (submitted in December 1999).

Saleam was affiliated with the Patriotic Youth League, and has been seen associating with neo-Nazi skinheads. In 2004, Saleam contested the NSW local government elections, and ran for Marrickville Council on an anti-refugee platform. In 2012, he ran for NSW local government election in the City of Blue Mountains.

=== Australia First Party ===
Saleam was the Secretary of the Sydney branch of the Australia First Party (AFP) between 2002 and 2007, when he became its chairman, and sought to re-establish the party. In July 2009, he announced that it had reached its target of 500 members and was registering the New South Wales branch party with the Australian Electoral Commission (AEC). The party was reregistered in mid-2010, in time to contest the 2010 federal election.

AFP contested the 2013 federal election, Saleam standing in the seat of Cook on a platform to end refugee intakes, running against Scott Morrison. He received 617 votes, or 0.67% of the vote.

On 14 July 2015, the AEC deregistered the AFP due to its failure to demonstrate the required number of members. It was reregistered on 1 March 2016 as "Australia First Party (NSW) Incorporated".

Saleam stood at the 2016 federal election in the seat of Lindsay and received 1068 votes or 1.2% of the vote. He stood for AFP in the 2018 Longman by-election, receiving 709 votes or 0.8% of the vote.

Saleam stood in the seat of Cootamundra, New South Wales, in the 2017 by-election as an independent, though still a member of Australia First, as the party is not registered for state elections. He received 453 votes, 1% of the total. He again stood in the seat at the 2019 New South Wales state election as an independent, receiving 0.95% of the vote. Saleam's platform included the reintroduction of the White Australia policy and opposition to Chinese immigration.

Saleam stood at the 2019 federal election and the 2025 federal election in the seat of Lindsay and received 1,372 votes or 1.41% of the vote in 2019 and 1,103 or 1.13% of the vote in 2025.

== Personal life ==
Saleam married Jane Mengler in 1987. They had two children and divorced in 1994.

== See also ==
- Far-right politics in Australia
- Reclaim Australia
- True Blue Crew
- United Patriots Front

== Bibliography ==
- McSwiney, Jordan (2024). Far-Right Political Parties in Australia. New York: Taylor & Francis. ISBN 9781003848929.
- Saleam, James (1999). The Other Radicalism: An Inquiry Into Contemporary Australian Extreme Right Ideology, Politics And Organization 1975–1995 (PDF) (Thesis). Sydney, Australia: Fisher Library, University of Sydney.
- Greason, David (1994). I was a Teenage Fascist. Carlton: McPhee Gribble. ISBN 9780869142851.
- Moore, Andrew (1995). The Right Road?: A History of Right-Wing Politics in Australia. Oxford University Press. ISBN 019553512X.
