= Depends What You Mean by Extremist =

2017 book written by Australian author and documentary-maker John Safran

- Author: John Safran
- Language: English
- Published: 1 May 2017
- Publisher: Hamish Hamilton (Penguin Books)
- Publication place: Australia
- Pages: 304
- ISBN: 978-1-926428-77-2

Depends What You Mean By Extremist: Going Rogue with Australian Deplorables is a 2017 book written by Australian author and documentary-maker John Safran. Safran investigates Australian extremists and radicalisation, including among white nationalists, ISIS supporters and anarchists.

== See also ==
- Far-right politics in Australia
- Far-right terrorism in Australia
