= National Socialist Party of Australia =

National Socialist Party National Socialist Party of Australia
- Abbreviation: NSPA
- Founded: January 1964; 62 years ago
- Dissolved: May 1977; 49 years ago
- Split from: Australian National Socialist
- Headquarters: Glebe, New South Wales, Australia
- Newspaper: • National Socialist Bulletin; • Action Report; • Stormtrooper
- Membership (1972): 200
- Ideology: Neo-Nazism; • Antisemitism; • White supremacy; • Pro-White Australia policy; • Australian ultranationalism
- Political position: Far-right
- International affiliation: World Union of National Socialists
- Colours: Brown
- Slogan: "The Nation – We Serve"

Party flag

The National Socialist Party of Australia (NSPA) was a minor Australian neo-Nazi party that operated between 1967 and the early 1970s. It was formed in 1967 as a more moderate breakaway from the Australian National Socialist Party (ANSP). The NSPA was led by Ted Cawthron.

== History ==
Cawthron and Frank Molnar launched the party in late 1967, explicitly rejecting the "jackbooted 'Nazi' image" associated with Arthur Smith's ANSP. They focused particularly on Smith's criminal convictions from a 1965 raid on ANSP headquarters. Although there were a number of attempts to reunite the two parties, the NSPA eventually attracted a number of other Australian national socialists disenchanted with Smith's leadership.

In May 1968, Smith resigned as leader of the ANSP and his successor, Eric Wenberg, merged the ANSP into the NSPA. Wenberg was accepted into a leadership position in the party, alongside Molnar as chairman, Cawthron as director of publications, Les Ritchie, and John Stewart. Early in 1969, however, Cawthron and Molnar fell out, with Molnar accusing Cawthron of being a closet Bolshevist. Molnar was expelled from the party.

In early 1970, the party's third congress in Canberra was attended by around 30 members. Later in the year, Cawthron became the first national socialist in Australia to run for public office, contesting the May 1970 ACT by-election. Cawthron came last out of seven candidates with 173 votes (0.32%), but claimed to be content with the result considering the minimal nature of the NSPA's campaign.

The party also ran three Senate teams for the 1970 Senate election: John Stewart and Michael McCormick in New South Wales, Ken Gibbett and Kevin Thompson in Queensland, and Cass and Katrina Young in Victoria. The Queensland team won the first place on the ballot paper and benefited from the donkey vote and received over 10,000 votes (1.51%), while the results for the other teams were insignificant. The national NSPA vote was 24,017 (0.43%).

=== Demise ===
By 1972 the party was collapsing. The strong Queensland branch collapsed through infighting, and the involvement of three party members in a bomb attack in April on the Queensland offices of the Communist Party of Australia. Establishment of a Sydney branch was frustrated by standover tactics of former members of ANSP. The Western Australian branch had collapsed and the ACT branch went into total eclipse. Only Victorian and South Australian branches survived the initial schism for a time, and even South Australia had to import a candidate from Melbourne.

Jim Saleam, then only 17, was deputy leader of the party between 1972 and 1975, after Molnar was expelled from the party, under Cawthron's leadership. After the demise of NSPA, Saleam went on to co-found National Action in 1982, which existed until 1991. Saleam then joined the Australia First Party in the 2000s and would eventually take leadership of that organisation.

== Electoral performance ==
=== Federal Parliament ===
House of Representatives
Election year	# of overall votes	% of overall vote	# of overall seats won	+/–
1972	1,161	0.02 (#7/8)	0 / 150	0

Senate
Election year	# of overall votes	% of overall vote	# of overall seats won	# of overall seats	+/–
1970	24,017	0.43 (#7)	0 / 40	0 / 76	0
1974	1,810	0.44 (#10/12)	0 / 40	0 / 76	0

== See also ==
- Australia First Party
- Far-right politics in Australia
- National Socialist Party of New Zealand (1969–1980)
