= Australian Nationalist Movement =

Militant Australian neo-Nazi organization (1985–1995)

Australian Nationalists Movement
- Celtic cross
- Other name: ANM
- Supreme leader: Jack Van Tongeren
- Second-in-command: John van Blitterswyk
- Third-in-command: Russell Willey
- Founded: April 20, 1985; 41 years ago (Note: The date of foundation was deliberately selected to coincide with Adolf Hitler's birthday.)
- Dates active: 1985–1995
- Dissolved: 1991; 35 years ago
- Split from: National Action
- Country: Australia
- Headquarters: Perth, Western Australia
- Active regions: Western Australia, South Australia, Queensland, New South Wales, Victoria, and Tasmania
- Ideology: Neo-Nazism; Strasserism; Esoteric Hitlerism
- Political position: Far-right
- Status: Defunct
- Size: Less than 150

The Australian Nationalists Movement (ANM) was an Australian neo-Nazi militant organization primarily active from 1985 to 1991. Founded in Perth in 1985 by Vietnam War veteran Jack Van Tongeren following an ideological split from National Action, the ANM sought to promote a National Socialist programme centered on antisemitism and opposition to non-European immigration, particularly from Asian immigrants. During its period of activity, the ANM became responsible for one of the most significant campaings of neo-Nazi violence, as the group carried a series of attacks against minority communities, particularly those of Asian descent.

Initially, the ANM’s activities concentrated its efforts on a propaganda campaign aimed to spread racial hostility. In February 1986, the organization registered as a legitimate political party and contested the seat of Helena, Western Australia, with Van Tongeren as candidate, though they failed to win the seat. In 1988, the organization’s activities escalated towards direct action, as its members carried out a series of racially motivated arson attacks and firebombings against Asian-owned restaurants and businesses with the stated objective of intimidating the local Asian community and provoking wider racial conflict. The ANM’s strategic-ideological framework was inspired by the 1978 novel The Turner Diaries, written by American neo-Nazi William L. Pierce.

The ANM began to collapse in 1989 following extensive police investigations and, in 1990, its leadership were tried and convicted on numerous charges on violence. Van Tongeren served 12 years in jail on more than fifty charges, including arson, stealing, conspiracy and assault. The aftermath of the trial led to the fragmentation of the Australian neo-Nazi scene and marked the termination of organized neo-Nazism as a significant force within the Australian far-right.
