= Australia First Party =

Australia First Party Australia First Party (NSW) Incorporated
- Abbreviation: AFP
- President: Jim Saleam
- Deputy Leader: Peter Schuback
- Founder: Graeme Campbell
- Founded: June 1996; 30 years ago
- Registered: 1996; 2010; 2016 (Note: Each time the party was registered with the Australian Electoral Commission (AEC), first in 1996, it was later deregistered for not meeting the requirements within the Commonwealth Electoral Act 1918.)
- Split from: Australian Labor Party
- Headquarters: Tempe, New South Wales, Australia
- Newspaper: Audacity (2008–2020)
- Youth wing: Eureka Youth League
- Ideology: White nationalism; Australian nationalism; Anti-immigration; Neo-fascism
- Political position: Right-wing to far-right
- National affiliation: Australian Coalition of Nationalists (since 2016)
- International affiliation: Alliance for Peace and Freedom
- Colours: Blue, red and black
- Slogan: Identity. Independence. Freedom.
- House of Representatives: 0 / 151
- Senate: 0 / 76

Eureka flag

Website
- australiafirstparty.net

The Australia First Party (AFP), officially known as the Australia First Party (NSW) Incorporated, is a far-right Australian nationalist political party founded in 1996 by Graeme Campbell, a former member of the Australian Labor Party. The policies of the party have been described as ultranationalist, anti-multicultural and economically protectionist, advocating for strict immigration controls, the prioritization of Australian citizens in employment, and the promotion of Australian culture and values. The party's logo includes the Southern Cross of the Eureka Flag.

The AFP's current leader, Jim Saleam, is a Lebanese Australian, a convicted arsonist, a former member of the National Socialist Party of Australia and founder of the militant Australian white nationalist group National Action. The party has been accused of having ties with fascism and neo-Nazism. In October 2022, the Global Project Against Hate and Extremism (GPAHE) released a report in which it classified the AFP as a "white nationalist" and "anti-immigrant" group.

As of July 2024, the party is only registered for local government elections with the New South Wales Electoral Commission (NSWEC) as "Australia First Party (NSW) Incorporated (Councils)".

== History ==
=== Campbell era ===
The Australia First Party was established in June 1996 by Graeme Campbell, and registered as a political party by the Australian Electoral Commission (AEC) on 13 September 1996. Campbell had been the federal Labor member for Kalgoorlie since 1980. However, he was disendorsed by Labor in 1995, and continued to sit in parliament as an independent. He was reelected as an independent at the 1996 Australian federal election, and formed AFP soon after. However, AFP was not successful at the 1998 federal election and Campbell lost his seat, blaming his loss on Australia First being eclipsed by One Nation. In 2009, he claimed that, if not for the presence of a One Nation candidate, he would have picked up an additional 8.5% of the vote, which would have been enough to keep him in the race.

Campbell remained Australia First's leader until June 2001, when he left the party to stand (unsuccessfully) as a One Nation Senate candidate in Western Australia. At the 2004 federal election, Campbell attempted unsuccessfully to regain his old federal seat as an independent. He again stood for the Senate in Western Australia at the 2007 federal election as an independent, and achieved 0.13% of the vote.

=== Saleam era ===
Prior to his election as leader of the party, Saleam served two jail terms; one for property offences and fraud in 1984, and the other for being an accessory before the fact in 1989 for his involvement in the shotgun attack on the home of Eddie Funde, an Australian representative of the African National Congress.

In 2002, Saleam ran as an AFP candidate for a seat on Marrickville Council, in Sydney, claiming "to oppose Marrickville being a Refugee Welcome Zone". Later that year the party formed its youth wing, the Patriotic Youth League, subsequently called the Eureka Youth League. (Note: Not to be confused with the Eureka Youth League, the former (1923–1984) youth wing of the Communist Party of Australia.) AFP was deregistered by the AEC on 13 August 2004 for failing to nominate candidates at elections for four years. By 2007, Saleam had reestablished AFP, and in July 2009, Saleam claimed that the party had 500 members, and announced that he was registering its New South Wales branch, Australia First Party (NSW) Incorporated, with the AEC. The branch was registered by AEC on 13 June 2010, in time for the 2010 federal election.

At the 2013 federal election, AFP was involved in Glenn Druery's Minor Party Alliance. Saleam stood in the seat of Cook on a platform to end refugee intakes, running against Scott Morrison, and received 617 votes, or 0.67% of the vote.

On 14 July 2015, the AEC de-registered the AFP due to its failure to demonstrate the required 500 members. It was re-registered on 1 March 2016 as "Australia First Party (NSW) Incorporated".

AFP contested the 2016 federal election, without any success. Saleam stood in the seat of Lindsay, New South Wales, receiving 1068 votes or 1.2% of the vote. In October 2016, the Australia First Party joined with the Australian Protectionist Party, Nationalist Alternative, Eureka Youth League, and Hellenic Nationalists of Australia to form the Australian Coalition of Nationalists, as a framework for cooperation between these entities.

Saleam also stood for AFP in the 2018 Longman by-election, receiving 709 votes or 0.8% of the vote.

Saleam stood in the seat of Cootamundra, New South Wales, in the 2017 by-election as an independent, though still a member of Australia First, as the party was not registered for NSW elections. He received 453 votes, 1% of the total. He again stood in the seat at the 2019 New South Wales state election as an independent. Saleam's platform included the reintroduction of the White Australia policy and opposition to Chinese immigration.

On 2 May 2014, the party aligned itself with the Golden Dawn party of Greece, an ultranationalist organisation, and on 24 July 2016, the party endorsed former Grand Wizard of the Ku Klux Klan David Duke for the 2016 Louisiana election via Twitter.

On 12 January 2022, the party was de-registered by the Australian Electoral Commission for failing to meet the increased requirement of 1,500 members.

The party supported the 2025 March for Australia.

In early 2026, the AFP attempted to distance itself from the neo-Nazi segments of the Australian far-right by criticising the National Socialist Network; and attempted to reach out to Australian Marxist–Leninists for the purposes of establishing a red–brown alliance. The left-wing nationalist and Marxist–Leninist Association for a Revolutionary Australia responded to this invitation by rebuking the white nationalist ideology of the AFP and criticising anti-capitalist third positionism.

== Policies and electoral performance ==
The party stands on a nationalist, anti-multicultural and economic protectionist platform. It advocates for strict immigration controls, the prioritization of Australian citizens in employment, and the protection of national sovereignty. The party follows eight core policies in their programme:

The AFP self-describes its ideology as a 'modern continuation of the Old Labor tradition'

- Ensure Australia retains full independence.
- Rebuild Australian manufacturing industries.
- Control foreign ownership.
- Reduce and limit immigration.
- Abolish multiculturalism.
- Introduce Citizen's Initiated Referendums.
- Strengthen the family.
- Strive to rebuild a united Australia.

The Australia First Party has been largely unsuccessful electorally. It has been elected to two local council seats, one in City of Penrith and one in City of Prospect. Saleam ran as a candidate in the 2018 Longman by-election, receiving 684 votes or 0.8% of the vote.

In the 2019 Australian federal election, the party put up three candidates: Susan Jakobi in Lalor, Peter Schubeck for Longman, and Michael Chehoff for Swan.

House of Representatives
Election year	# of overall votes	% of overall vote	# of overall seats won	+/–	Government
1998	28,069	0.25 (#8)	0 / 150	0	
2010	3,670	0.03 (#16)	0 / 150	0	
2013	7,412	0.06 (#15)	0 / 150	0	
2016	6,895	0.05 (#24)	0 / 150	0	
2019	6,786	0.05 (#23)	0 / 150	0	

Senate
Election year	# of overall votes	% of overall vote	# of overall seats won	# of overall seats	+/–	Notes
1998	46,765	0.41 (#8)	0 / 40	0 / 76	0	
2010	9,680	0.08 (#21)	0 / 40	0 / 76	0	
2013	10,157	0.08 (#32)	0 / 40	0 / 76	0	
2016	3,027	0.02 (#47)	0 / 40	0 / 76	0	

=== Queensland ===
Legislative Assembly
Election year	# of overall votes	% of overall vote	# of overall seats	+/–	Notes
1998	9,560	0.49 (#6)	0 / 89	0	

=== New South Wales ===
Legislative Council
Election year	# of overall votes	% of overall vote	# of overall seats	+/–	Notes
1999	4,709	0.13 (#44)	0 / 21	0	

=== South Australia ===
Legislative Council
Election year	# of overall votes	% of overall vote	# of overall seats	+/–	Notes
1997	9,150	1.02 (#10)	0 / 22	0	

=== Western Australia ===
Legislative Council
Election year	# of overall votes	% of overall vote	# of overall seats	+/–	Notes
1996	5,856	0.60 (#7)	0 / 36	0	

== Activities ==
The Australia First Party's activities have mainly consisted of distributing anti-immigration and racist pamphlets and protesting, although they denied involvement in some highly racist leaflets dropped in mailboxes in 2010 Campbelltown.

=== Cronulla riots (2005) ===
The group played a large role in the 2005 Cronulla riots. In the week prior to the riots, the AFP encouraged members to go to the seaside suburb of Cronulla. Its website called for "patriots" to show solidarity with victims of "anti-Australian race and hate and violence". AFP claim that 120 members and supporters attended the riots, and both members of the AFP and their youth wing the Patriotic Youth League were seen handing out anti-immigration leaflets and supplying alcohol there. Their website later described the riots as a "civil uprising of the Australian people".

=== Nathan Sykes arrest ===
On 20 March 2019, Australia First member Nathan Sykes, described as a "prolific online troll and a lieutenant of Australia's most prominent white supremacist Jim Saleam", was charged with at least eight offences, after allegations that he made repeated and detailed violent threats to Melbourne journalist and lawyer Luke McMahon. He had previously made numerous racist and intimidating online comments targeting high-profile Australians, including ex-Racial Discrimination Commissioner Tim Soutphommasane, activist Mariam Veiszadeh and Guardian journalist Van Badham.

The league disbanded in 2006, but was reincarnated as the Eureka Youth League in 2010 (not to be confused with the historical Eureka Youth League). As of April 2021, the Eureka Youth League has a website and Facebook group; however, the last post on the latter was in October 2017.

== Racism allegations ==
Australia First Party is as of March 2019 led by convicted criminal and far-right activist Jim Saleam. Saleam was a member of the short-lived National Socialist Party of Australia as a teenager during the early 1970s and the founder of the militant Australian white nationalist group National Action.

Australia First also endorsed independent candidate John Moffat, who was later criticised by B'nai B'rith Anti-Defamation Commission chairman Michael Lipshutz, Cronulla Liberal MLA Malcolm Kerr and Lebanese Muslim Association spokesman Jihad Dib for "inciting racial hatred".

On 10 July 2009, the Sydney Morning Herald reported that David Palmer, the Imperial Wizard of the Ku Klux Klan in Australia, said several Klan members had secretly joined Australia First. Palmer said Australia First had been identified as an Aryan party and would prove useful "in case the ethnics get out of hand and they need sorting out." The Australia First Party later endorsed former Grand Wizard of the Ku Klux Klan David Duke for the 2016 Louisiana election via Twitter.

In July 2010, it was reported that Australia First was distributing leaflets comparing Africans to monkeys, and "blaming Africans for the social problems in Sydney's west". Australia First denied responsibility for the leaflets, claiming that they had been distributed in an attempt to discredit the party.

In July 2018 the Australia First Party published an article on their website discussing the Philippines–Australia basketball brawl in which Filipinos are denigrated. In this article the letter L is often replaced by the letter R, referencing the racist trope in which Asians cannot pronounce the letter 'L'. This is despite the fact that the only major Asian language which does not contain the letter L is Japanese, whereas all Filipino languages contain the sound. This is an especially flawed judgement as the Philippines fought Japan in the second world war. Moro Guerillas in Jolo slaughtered 97% of occupying Japanese soldiers.

The Australia First Party used Sinophobia and fear of African Australians in their campaign during the 2019 election.

== See also ==
- Australian nationalism
- Far-right politics in Australia
  - Reclaim Australia
  - Romper Stomper
  - True Blue Crew
  - United Patriots Front
- Islamophobia in Australia
- List of white nationalist organizations
- New Zealand First
- Social fascism
