= National Action (Australia) =

Militant Australian nationalist organisation (1982–1991)

Australian National Action
- A sun wheel over the Southern Cross, the official emblem of the organization.
- Other name: National Action
- Founders: Jim Saleam; Frank Salter; Edward Azzopardi; Boris Link; David Merrett... and others
- Leaders: Jim Saleam (first); Michael Brander (last)
- Founded: February 1982; 44 years ago
- Dates active: 1982 – 1995
- Dissolved: 1995; 31 years ago
- Country: Australia
- Headquarters: Tempe, New South Wales
- Newspaper: Audacity (1983–1989)
- Ideology: Radical-Nationalism; Australian nationalism; White nationalism; Republicanism; Third Position
- Political position: Right-wing to far-right
- Size: est. 500 (1989)
- Flag

Australian National Action, commonly known as National Action, was an Australian far-right militant organisation established in 1982 and active until 1995. Founded by Jim Saleam and Frank Salter, alongside other fifteen people, NA described itself as an Australian nationalist movement that sought to defend Australia’s White and European identity by combating multiculturalism and immigration —particularly from Asia— through a strategy of “political guerrilla warfare”. Initially a student-based movement, NA evolved into a more aggressive organisation reacting against multiculturalism, which they perceived as threats to a predominantly White Australian society.

Ideologically, National Action drew inspiration from the radical nationalist tradition in early labourist movements, being influenced by historical figures such as William Lane and P.R. Stephensen, and argued that Australia as a country should remain predominantly a White, European nation with homogenous values and beliefs, based on its labour-nationalist-republican political tradition. NA was characterized by a hierarchical structure characterized by its authoritarian leadership, and they supported militant direct action to achieve its political goals. Among their targets were racial minorities, immigrants, homosexuals and organizations supportive of progressive causes.

After a failed attempt to depose National Action’s leadership, Jack van Tongeren alongside other radical members from NA split from the organisation and formed the Australian Nationalist Movement (ANM) in 1985, where he established himself as their “supreme leader”. The ANM was founded under a National Socialist program, and carried a violent campaign against Asian immigration by firebombing a number of Chinese restaurants. Van Tongeren wished to outbid National Action’s militancy as they saw it as competition to control the anti-Asian movement, starting a smear campaign against its ‘leftist’ leadership to eliminate them. However, it is suspected that both groups remained connected.

In January 1989, two National Action members carried out a shotgun attack into the home of African National Congress representative Eddie Funde, leading to their charge alongside Saleam as the provider of the weapon. Saleam’s imprisonment in 1991, alongside the murder of a member in NA’s headquarters in Tempe that same year, lead to the group’s decline. Saleam pleaded not guilty to his charge, claiming that he was set up by police, but was still imprisoned for three years. Saleam later became the New South Wales chairman of the Australia First Party, and stood as its endorsed candidate several times. The NA would last until 1995, before Pauline Hanson emerged and began the process of popularising and polarising the group’s nationalist platform.

== See also ==
- Australians Against Further Immigration
- Far-right politics in Australia
- Reclaim Australia
- True Blue Crew
- United Patriots Front

== Sources ==
- Campion, Kristy (2019). "A 'Lunatic Fringe'? The Persistence of Right Wing Extremism in Australia". Perspectives on Terrorism. 13 (2): 2–20.
- Gibson, Jano; Frew, Wendy (29 February 2004). "No Apology For White Australia Policy". The Sydney Morning Herald.
- Greason, David (1994). I was a Teenage Fascist. Carlton: McPhee Gribble. ISBN 9780869142851.
- Norris, Pippa (2005). Radical right: voters and parties in the electoral market. Cambridge: Cambridge University Press. ISBN 978-0-511-13988-8.
- Saleam, James (1999). The Other Radicalism: An Inquiry Into Contemporary Australian Extreme Right Ideology, Politics And Organization 1975–1995 (PDF) (Thesis). Sydney, Australia: Fisher Library, University of Sydney.
- Sewell, Bon (1995). "Australia full: Asians out! White supremacists in!": a study of the dynamics of the Australian National Action Movement in Australia (PDF) (Honours thesis). Victoria, Australia: Victoria University of Technology.
- Whitford, Troy (April 2011). "A political history of National Action: Its fears, ideas, tactics and conflicts". Rural Society. 20 (2): 216–226. doi:10.5172/rsj.20.2.216. ISSN 2204-0536.
- Whitford, Troy (2013). "Combating Political Police: An Overview of National Action's Counterintelligence Program 1982–1990" (PDF). Salus Journal. 2 (1).
- "Fitzgerald Immigration Enquiry A Fraud". White Australia News. No. 12. National Action. 1988.
- "White separatist takes on Marrickville". The Sydney Morning Herald. 29 February 2004.
