= Australian nationalism =

Nationalism in support of the collective identity of Australia

Australian nationalism is the ideology, movement and sentiment that emphasizes the identity, culture, and interests of Australia as a nation-state, asserting the identity of Australians as a distinct nation, regardless of its previously derivative and colonial status. It encompasses a range of beliefs and values that are often rooted in Australia's history, geography, and socio-political context. Key elements of Australian nationalism include a sense of national pride, attachment to Australian symbols such as the flag and national anthem, and a focus on promoting Australia's sovereignty and independence.

Historically, Australian nationalism emerged during the late 19th and early 20th centuries as Australia moved towards federation and gained independence from British colonial rule, developing itself in three pivotal historical traditions: the labour movement, the republican movement and nativism. It was shaped by factors such as the experiences of early settlers and the desire for a distinct Australian identity separate from British influence.

== History ==
=== Pre-Federation ===
By the early 19th century, Australia was governed as a series of six largely self-governing colonies that were spread across the continent and were part of the British Empire. The name Australia was popularised by explorer Matthew Flinders and first used officially by Governor Macquarie. Some historians have described the first emergence of an Australian national movement in the mid-19th century. Attempts to coordinate governance had failed in the 1860s due to a lack of popular support and lack of interest from the British government, but by the 1880s, and with the rise of nationalist movements in Europe, the efforts to establish a federation of the Australian colonies began to gather momentum. The British government supported federation as a means to cement British influence in the South Pacific.

Figures like William Wentworth, John Dunmore Lang and Banjo Patterson championed Australian identity during the colonial era.

=== Post-Federation ===
Nationalistic sentiments increased as a result of Australia's participation in the First and Second World Wars, with concepts such as "mateship" becoming a cornerstone of Australian nationalism.

== Flags ==
=== Flags used by Australian nationalists ===
Australian Red Ensign

Older variations of the Australian flag

Eureka Flag

Australian Federation Flag

"The Men From Snowy River" flag used during World War I snowball marches

== See also ==
- Eureka rebellion
- Anzac spirit
- Reclaiming Patriotism
