= Maryborough Central State School =

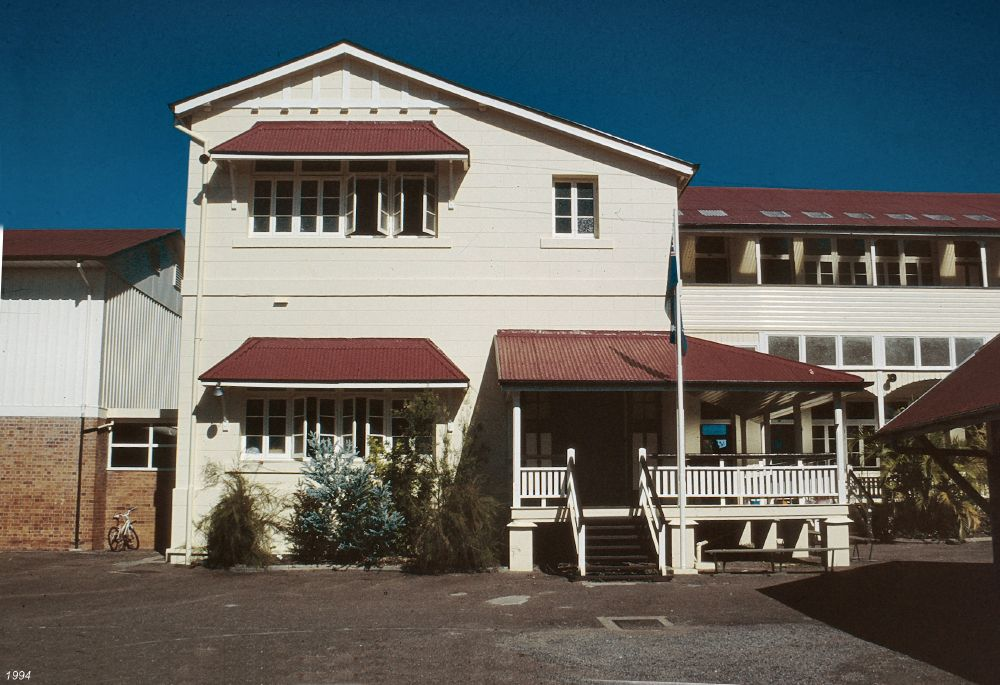
- Block C, Maryborough Central State School, 1994

- Location within Queensland
- 25.5348°S 152.7001°E
- Location: 471 Kent Street, Maryborough, Fraser Coast Region, Queensland, Australia

History
- Design period: 1870s–1890s (late 19th century)
- Founded: 1862
- Built: 1875–1953
- Built for: Department of Public Instruction

Queensland Heritage Register
- Official name: Maryborough Central State School, Central State School for Boys, Central State School for Girls, Central State School for Infants
- Type: state heritage (built)
- Designated: 31 October 1994
- Reference no.: 601264
- Significant period: 1870s (historical immigration); 1870s–1920s (historical school); 1875–1920s (fabric); 1870s ongoing
- Significant components: play shed, residential accommodation – headmaster's house, depot, school/school room, infants' school, memorial – honour board/ roll of honour, workshop

Maryborough Central State School is a heritage-listed state school at 471 Kent Street, Maryborough, Fraser Coast Region, Queensland, Australia. It was built from 1875 to 1953. It is also known as Central State School for Boys, Central State School for Girls, and Central State School for Infants. It was the first state school in Maryborough and was established with separate girls and boys departments. It is the oldest public school in Queensland. It was added to the Queensland Heritage Register on 31 October 1994.

== History ==
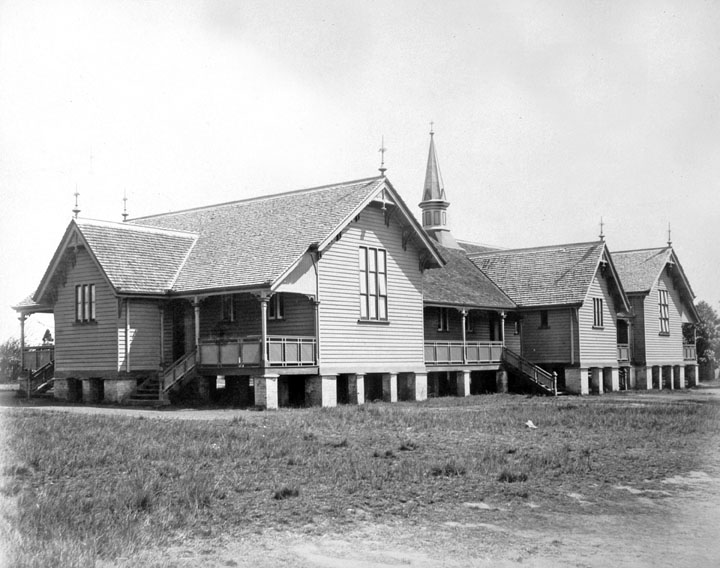
Maryborough Central State School, circa 1890

The first state school at Maryborough was established in 1862 in a small building at the northeast corner of Kent and Lennox Streets (on the site that is now known as the Maryborough School of Arts building). In the first week, 35 scholars attended the primary school on Tuesday morning when the school first opened. The number was growing quickly, and by then a good school was rapidly being established.

In 1865 the school shifted to a purpose-built schoolhouse at the corner of Alice and Lennox Streets. Despite an additional wing being erected in 1872, the Alice Street premises proved too small to cater for Maryborough's burgeoning population, and the school was moved yet again to the present Kent Street premises in 1877.

Maryborough Central State School has a number of historically significant buildings. Block C, a two-storeyed masonry building, was erected in 1875–1876, initially as an immigration depot, and was converted for school use in mid-1877. The adjacent single-storeyed timber infants' school (Block A) was erected in 1881–1882, as was the teacher's residence on the far side of the school reserve, fronting Sussex Street. Two of the three timber-framed playsheds were erected in 1879, the other in 1909, and the two-storeyed masonry building (Block B) behind the infants' school, was erected in 1923–24 as a technical college workshop.

=== Block C ===
The Maryborough Central State School site initially was acquired by the colonial government as a reserve for immigration purposes, and the first building on the site (now Block C) was erected as an immigration depot. In 1874 the Queensland Colonial Architect's office, headed by FDG Stanley, prepared plans for a new immigration building at Maryborough, in response to increased direct immigration to the Port of Maryborough. The building was to accommodate on the ground floor, wards for single men, two storerooms, a visitors' room and warders' quarters, and on the first floor, wards for married couples and single women. To each ward was attached a kitchen, lavatory, bath room and earth closets. Tenders were called in December 1874, and the contract was let in early March 1875 to Maryborough builder John T Annear, who tendered with a price of £4,650, and a time of 10 months.

The immigration building had been completed by early April 1876, and the colonial architect recommended that a wardsman occupy the building at once. This action was approved, but it is not clear whether immigrants were ever housed at the new barracks. The principal obstacle to occupation was the lack of water storage. The Maryborough Chronicle of 4 April 1876, in describing the new immigration building, commented:

Now that the buildings are completed they are perfectly useless until supplied with tanks for water. For this purpose there is no money available, and the building must remain untenanted until the necessary money is granted by the Government.

Whilst funding was made available for fencing and gates in 1876, a contract for two large brick underground tanks, each 20 feet (6.1 m) deep by 16 feet (4.9 m) in diameter, was not let until March 1877. In the meantime, the colonial secretary had been approached with an alternative proposal for the use of the site.

By December 1876, the Department of Public Instruction was investigating the possibility of exchanging the Maryborough primary school premises in Alice Street for the new immigration building, proposing to convert the immigration barracks into state schools (boys and combined girls and infants), and to convert the former school buildings, which comprised a two-storeyed brick building, a single-storeyed timber building and two playsheds, into an immigration depot. Although a new school reserve had been gazetted in October 1876 – bounded by Kent, Sussex, Ferry and Fort Streets and adjacent to the new immigration reserve – acute overcrowding, particularly in the infant classes, at the Alice Street school prompted more direct action. In February 1877, Executive Council passed the proposal to exchange the existing school buildings for the new immigration premises, with the cost of fitting up the school buildings as an immigration depot to be met by the Department of Public Instruction.

Whilst the majority of parents were in favour of the exchange, the wider Maryborough community was not. At a well-attended meeting held at the Town Hall on 8 June 1876, residents protested at the conversion of the present immigration barracks to any other use than that for which it was originally built. They sought instead to sponsor the construction of a new school building, and elected a committee, headed by Mayor J. T. Annear (contractor for the immigration depot), to pass on their resolutions to the Queensland Government and to institute a building fund. The protest was too late; the exchange went ahead despite a recommendation from the assistant immigration agent in Maryborough, that the school buildings would be unsuitable as an immigration depot, being in a most wretched state of decay, and dirt having quite the appearance of being hurried to dilapidation.

Specifications for remodelling the interior of the immigration barracks for school purposes were prepared in March 1877, and the work was completed by mid-July, at a cost of £248. On the ground floor, the partitions forming the sitting room and two bedrooms of the warder's quarters were removed, and the two kitchens (warder's and single men's) were converted to classrooms, with galleries suitable for boys over the age of 8 years. On the upper floor, the two kitchens (married couples' and single women's) were converted to classrooms with galleries suitable for children under 8 years of age. The bathrooms and earth closets on both floors were fitted out as hat rooms and lavatories. The two brick underground tanks were removed and re-erected at the former school buildings in Alice Street.

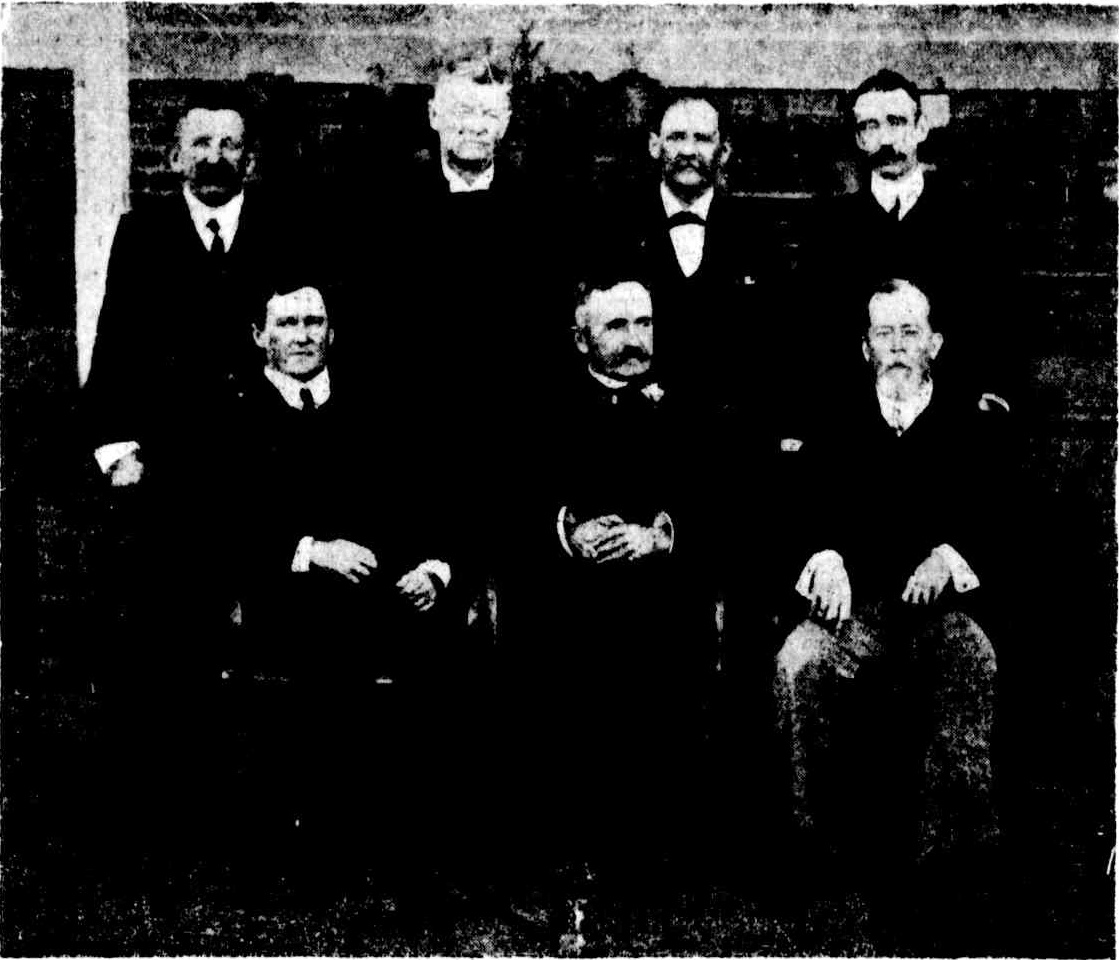
Committee of the Maryborough Central State School, 1912

The Alice Street school was closed from 17 to 20 July 1877 for furniture to be moved to the new building, and re-opened at the former immigration barracks on 23 July, with boys accommodated on the ground floor, and girls and infants on the first floor. Although the latter was a combined school, the girls occupied one half of the upper floor, and the infants the other, and there was little exchange between the two staff. From January 1878, three separate departments operated at Maryborough Central School: boys, girls, infants, the total enrolment for the combined girls and infants school having reached over 600.

The school population increased rapidly in the first few years, and alterations costing just under £600 were made to the main building by Messrs J & J Rooney in 1880–1881. The lack of classroom space was not eased, however, until the construction of a separate infants' building (Block A) in the school grounds in 1881–1882.

Asphalting, fencing and repairs were undertaken in 1910.

In the period 1914–16, a second staircase was installed in the main building, leading from the girls' school on the upper floor over the playgrounds at the back of the boys' school. In 1917 the school building committee decided to memorialise past students of Maryborough Central School who had served with the armed forces overseas since 1914, with the erection of an Honour Board in the foyer of the main building. This was unveiled on 19 April 1917.

From 15 August 1932, the Central State School for Girls and the Central State School for Boys were combined as the Maryborough Central State School, under a single principal. Since 1877, the two schools had shared common premises and a single building committee, and in 1932 it was finally recognised that the schools could be more efficiently administrated if combined. The Maryborough Central Infants' School remained separate.

By the 1930s, the main school building was badly in need of repair. In 1932–1933, Works Department prepared a remodelling scheme to cost approximately £2,400. This comprised partitioning each floor into seven classrooms and teachers' rooms; walls were remodelled to permit maximum light and ventilation; and two sets of concrete stairs were constructed from the first floor, at the rear of the building. The building was rendered at this time. Work commenced in late 1933, and continued into 1934. When school re-commenced after the summer holidays, pupils were accommodated at the Maryborough show grounds until the renovations to the school building were completed in late May 1934. The official opening of the remodelled school was held on 13 July 1934.

From 1941, the office of the Chief Medical Officer of School Health Services, Maryborough District, was located in the main building of the Central School.

From August 1942, the Royal Australian Air Force used the main building of the Central School to conduct instructional classes (outside of school hours) for its 65th Squadron, apparently based at Maryborough. In 1943, the Air Force enclosed one of the southeast verandahs of the building, as an Orderly Room.

=== Block A (Infant's School) ===
The former Immigration Barracks barely accommodated the Alice Street students who moved there in mid-1877; by early 1879, overcrowding had reached chronic proportions, with some parents refusing to send their children to the school. In 1880, the Department of Public Instruction agreed that a new building was required. Plans were prepared by Public Works, and tenders were called for a new infants school building in March 1881. The contract was let in June that year to Maryborough contractors George William & Edwin Negus, with a price of £1,601, and the building was completed in August 1882. It comprised one large central classroom, and smaller a classroom at either end.

In 1910, dormer windows were installed in the southern side of the roof above the central classroom, tenders being called in April and the work completed in August. In 1920, two additional dormer windows were inserted on the northern side of the roof.

In late 1934 the infants' school was remodelled, with the southern verandah and hatroom removed and the southern end wall sheeted in weatherboards; the galleries removed in the main room, its floors levelled and the space partitioned into three classrooms; all classrooms lined in pine; and windows throughout enlarged.

In the immediate years after the end of the Second World War, the infant school population boomed. A new classroom was added to the northwest end of the building c. 1947, necessitating the removal of a hat room. About 1953, this was extended with a two-classroom wing, and another wing was added to the southeast end of the building.

=== Teacher's Residence ===
In October 1881, the Department of Public Instruction also let a contract for the construction of a teacher's residence in the grounds of Maryborough Central Staee School. This was erected and completed in 1882 by builder Robert Menzies, for just under £500.

The residence has undergone a number of small renovations since first constructed. The northwest end of the building was extended in 1909, with the addition of a new bedroom, bathroom and front verandah. In 1935 a flush toilet was added to the back of the building; this room and the bathroom and back verandah were remodelled in 1939 to the present configuration.

=== Playsheds ===
Two shingle-roofed playsheds, one for boys, the other for girls and infants, were constructed by W Hinsch in 1879. Re-roofed, these structures survive, although the former girls' and infants' playshed has been repositioned within the school grounds.

An infants' playshed was erected in late 1909 by Maryborough contractors Crystall & Armstrong. This was roofed with galvanised iron sheeting rather than shingles.

=== Technical College ===
In 1923, work started on a Technical College workshop in the grounds of the Central Schools. The first brick of this two-storeyed building was laid by Queensland Premier Ted Theodore on 20 April 1923, and the building was occupied in 1924. Under the Apprenticeship Act 1924, attendance at technical classes was made compulsory, and over their 5-year contract, apprentices attended the new Maryborough workshop at night. A report in the Maryborough Chronicle of 11 December 1926, described the equipment as up-to-date, and includes turning lathes and other machinery.

Maryborough Technical College had been established in 1889 as an adjunct of the Maryborough School of Arts, and by 1900 was one of the largest in Queensland. In 1908, the technical college was set up as a separate institution, with a wooden building constructed at the end of the School of Arts in 1910. Under the Technical Instruction Act Amendment Act 1918, control of country technical colleges was gradually taken over by the Department of Education, but the Maryborough college, a non-government institution, remained outside the department's control until c. 1937. Some government control was exercised, however, through annual funding subsidies. When the Maryborough workshop was erected in 1924, it was the second building erected for the Maryborough Technical College, and was done so by the Department of Public Works, with state government subsidy. The building was taken over by the adjacent High School in 1943, but currently is used by Maryborough Central State School as a resource centre.

=== 21st century ===
In 2011, there were 330 students enrolled in years 1 to 7.

In 2016, there were 324 students enrolled in years Prep to 6 with 27 teachers (24 full-time equivalent) and 22 non-teaching staff (13 full-time equivalent).

== Description ==
The historically significant buildings and structures at Maryborough Central School, bounded by Kent, John and Sussex Streets, comprise teaching block A (infants school), education centre block B (technical college workshop), teaching and administration block C (central school), three playsheds and a principal's residence.

=== Teaching Block A ===
Teaching block A (infants school), located fronting Kent Street to the southwest, consists mostly of a series rooms opening off an articulated northeastern verandah. The central section contains the altered original building, and additions have occurred to the northern end with a later school building being added to the eastern corner. The building, a single-storeyed weatherboard and chamferboard structure, has masonry and concrete stumps and corrugated iron gable roofs with large dormer windows and a spire to the central section. Gables have decorative timber eave brackets and fretwork panels, and verandahs have timber brackets and posts with rail balustrades. Windows are mostly casements, with sashes to the verandahs and hoppers to some later sections.

Internally, the central section has vertically jointed boarded walls and hardboard ceilings. Two partitioned staff areas have boarding to sill height with sash windows or fixed glazing above, and a separate staff room projects to the northeast of the verandah. The attached school building on the eastern corner has enclosed northwest and southeast verandahs, and the northern additions have boarded ceilings raked to collar-beam height.

=== Education Centre Block B ===
Education centre block B (technical college workshop), located to the northeast of teaching block A, is a two-storeyed brick structure with a hipped corrugated iron roof. The building has large multi-paned sash windows with angled headers and rendered sills, with rendered keystones to the ground floor windows. Entrances are located on the southwest and northeast, with the southwest entrance having a deep cornice supported by brackets above the door and with a fixed window above. The northeast entrance consists of a two-storeyed rendered composition of double timber doors with windows above to the ground floor, and similar doors with an arched fanlight to the first floor accessed from an external timber stair. An incinerator stack is located on the southeast wall, and an external timber stair is located on the northwest.

Internally, the building has no access between floors. Both levels have suspended ceilings and some timber partition walls, but are mostly open plan. A steep timber stair is located on the first floor and accesses the roof space.

=== Teaching and Administration Block C ===
Teaching and administration block C (central school), located to the southeast of teaching block A and fronting Kent Street to the southwest, is a two-storeyed rendered masonry structure, scribed to imitate stonework, with a hipped corrugated iron roof with projecting gables.

The symmetrical Kent Street elevation (southwest) has a central gable section which consists of an entrance porch to the ground floor with double timber doors and a sash window either side, and a triple sash window to the first floor and rendered quoining to the corners. The porch has paired chamfered timber posts, arched brackets and batten balustrade, a concrete floor and hipped corrugated iron roof, while the first floor triple sash window has a long hood supported by curled metal brackets. Either side of the projecting gable section are two- storeyed verandahs which return at either end of the building.

The verandahs have timber posts and batten balustrade, with a deep arched timber frieze to the ground floor and capitals to the first floor posts. Glazing panels have been inserted to much of the frieze, and skylight panels to the first floor verandah roof. The southeast verandah has been enclosed on both levels. The rear of the building (northeast) has projecting two-storeyed wings at either end and similar verandahs between.

Each wing has an internal stair, and the northern wing has a ground floor toilet block extension and the southern wing a ground floor entrance verandah. Windows are mostly casements, but some sash windows survive from the original structure.

Internally, circulation is via the northeast verandah. Stairs are concrete with timber handrails, and metal balustrades and newel posts. Structural walls are rendered masonry with others being timber partitions, ceilings are boarded and an honour board is located in the ground floor southwest entrance. Very few rooms have French doors opening to the southwest verandahs.

=== Playsheds ===
The three playsheds, one located to the northeast of teaching and administration block C and two located to the northeast of teaching block A, consist of corrugated iron gable roofs with boarded ends supported by timber posts and struts. The playsheds have bench seating and no ceilings.

=== Principal's Residence ===
The principal's residence, located in the northern corner of the site fronting Sussex Street to the northeast, consists of a single-storeyed chamferboard structure with concrete stumps and a corrugated iron gable roof.

The building was originally symmetrical to Sussex Street, with a central projecting gable with triple sash window and verandahs either side. The building was later extended to the northwest. The verandahs have timber posts and batten balustrade, and are enclosed above with a metal grille. Gables have decorative timber brackets and pendants, and most of the sash and hopper windows have hoods. An addition has occurred to the rear of the kitchen, and small verandah spaces on the southeast and northwest have been enclosed.

Internally, the building has a central fireplace, vertically jointed boarding to walls, boarded ceilings and French doors opening onto the verandahs. The kitchen fireplace has been removed and the walls sheeted with hardboard.

== Awards ==
Students of the school won the Lilley Medal in 1910 (Eric B. Freeman), 1911 (Idrisyn F. Jones), 1933 (Patricia Enid Fairlie), and 1935 (Oscar A. Kindervater).

== Heritage listing ==
Maryborough Central State School was listed on the Queensland Heritage Register on 31 October 1994 having satisfied the following criteria.

The place is important in demonstrating the evolution or pattern of Queensland's history.

Maryborough Central State School is important for its association with primary education in Maryborough since 1862, and the present Maryborough Central State School buildings are important in demonstrating changing attitudes to education from the 1870s. The 1875–1876 building, although associated with immigration for only a brief period, remains as important evidence of the expansion of immigration to Queensland ports other than Brisbane in the 1870s.

Block B is particularly significant for its association with the expansion of technical education in Maryborough in the interwar period.

The place is important in demonstrating the principal characteristics of a particular class of cultural places.

The 1881–1882 infants' school and teacher's residence survive as examples of timber school and school residence design in Queensland. The teachers' residence in particular is one of the oldest and most intact buildings of its type in the state.

The place is important because of its aesthetic significance.

The Central State School is located within an historic precinct of educational facilities consisting of the adjoining former Maryborough Boys Grammar School building and the present Maryborough State High School (formerly the Girls Grammar School). The school is an important component of the Kent Street streetscape of civic buildings, and comprises a variety of building types and forms, demonstrating changing attitudes to education and the resulting architecture considered appropriate. The buildings form an attractive group, contributing to the Maryborough townscape

From its lengthy association with Maryborough and its prominent position on one of the major arterial roads in that city, the Central State School, and in particular the two-storeyed 1875–1876 building, has acquired landmark status in the community.

The place has a strong or special association with a particular community or cultural group for social, cultural or spiritual reasons.

From its lengthy association with Maryborough and its prominent position on one of the major arterial roads in that city, the Central State School, and in particular the two-storeyed 1875–1876 building, has acquired landmark status in the community.

== See also ==
- List of schools in Wide Bay-Burnett
- History of state education in Queensland
