= P. R. Stephensen =

Australian writer, publisher and political activist (1901–1965)

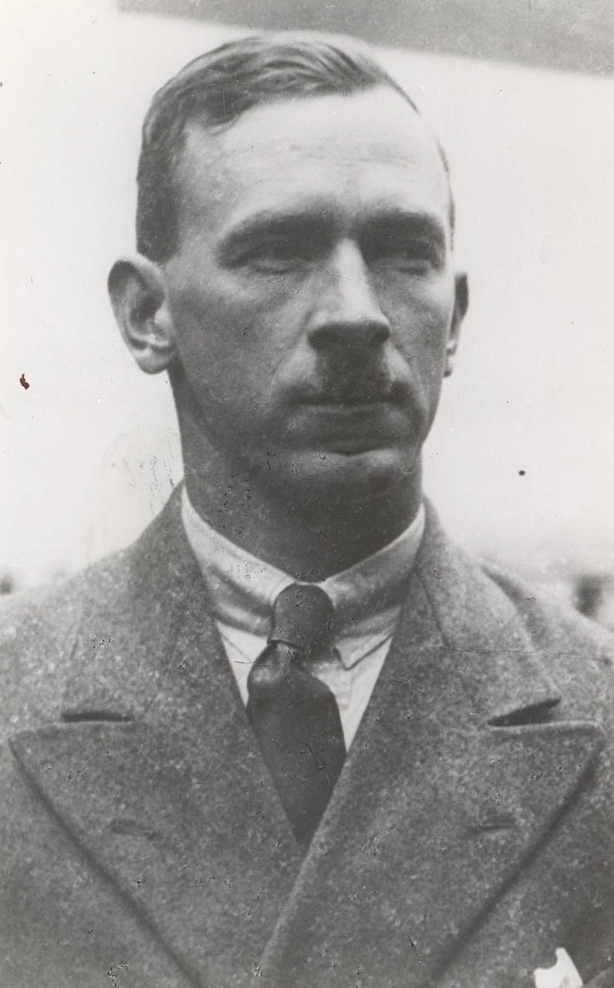
- Stephensen circa 1934
- Born: Percy Reginald Stephensen; 20 November 1901; Maryborough, Queensland, Australia
- Died: 28 May 1965 (aged 63); Sydney, New South Wales, Australia
- Education: The Queen's College, Oxford; University of Queensland
- Occupations: Writer; Publisher; Political activist
- Spouse: Winifred Sarah Venus (m. 1947)
- Children: 1

Percy Reginald Stephensen (20 November 1901 – 28 May 1965), known by his initials as P. R. Stephensen, was an Australian writer, publisher and political activist, first aligned with communism and later shifting support towards far-right politics. He was the co-founder of the fascist Australia First Movement, alongside businessman William Miles, and he was the author of The Foundations of Culture in Australia.

Stephensen was born in Maryborough, Queensland, of Danish and Swiss descent. Studying his Bachelor of Arts (BA) degree at the University of Queensland, Stephensen joined the Communist Party of Australia (CPA) in 1921. Upon winning the Rhodes Scholarship in 1924 he left for England and joined the university branch of the Party. Graduating, he joined the Fanfrolico Press alongside fellow author Jack Lindsay, releasing an assortment of their own writings as well as translated works. After the press ceased operation, Stephensen established his own press, lasting only a year. During this time he cohabitated with former ballet dancer Winifred Sarah Venus (née Lockyer), whom he later married in 1947 following her first husband's death.

Upon returning to Australia with Winifred in 1932, Stephensen partnered with magazine The Bulletin to found another publishing press, the Endeavour Press, in the same year alongside fellow Norman Lindsay. Splitting from the press in 1933, he founded yet another press, P. R. Stephensen & Co., which published more Australian works before failing in 1935 due to financial stresses. Despite the repeated collapses of his publishing companies, Stephensen became a recognised figure in Australian literature, becoming vice-president of the Fellowship of Australian Writers.

During the Moscow Trials, Stephensen became disillusioned with communism. In 1936 Stephensen penned his most famous work, The Foundations of Culture in Australia, sparking the emergence of the Jindyworobak movement. Founding the monthly publication The Publicist alongside businessman William Miles, he laid down the fundamental frameworks of the Australia First Movement, which the two established in October 1941. After five months of activity, Stephensen and his colleagues in the movement, suffragette Adela Pankhurst being among them, were detained by the Australian government. Being released after the war's end, Stephensen continued to write until his death in 1965.

== Early life ==
Percy Reginald Stephensen was born on 20 November 1901 in Maryborough, Queensland. He was the oldest of six children born to Marie-Louise Aimee (née Tardent) and Christian Julius (Chris) Stephensen. The family lived on a small farm outside Biggenden, where his father was a wheelwright, farrier and coffin-maker; he later took over the town's general store. His father was the secretary of the local branch of the Workers' Political Organisation and his mother was the Biggenden correspondent for the Maryborough Chronicle. Stephensen's paternal grandparents were Danish immigrants who had arrived in Queensland in the 1870s, converting from Lutheranism to Anglicanism and anglicising their surname from the original "Steffensen". Their children rapidly assimilated into the local community and did not learn Danish. Stephensen's mother and maternal grandparents were immigrants from the Swiss French colony at Chabag, Russia (now Ukraine); his mother was bilingual in French and English. Stephensen's maternal grandfather Henry Tardent was an agricultural scientist who managed an experimental farm and later became a journalist and writer. Stephensen's youngest brother, Cyril Edward (Ted), served with the RAAF during World War II and was shot down over France and killed in May 1944.

Stephensen learned to shoot and ride at a young age, as was typical at the time. He began his education at Biggenden Primary School and in 1914 placed within the top 100 students in the state secondary school examinations. This entitled him to a two-year government-funded scholarship, and in 1915 he began boarding at Maryborough Boys' Grammar School. The school's headmaster Noble Wallace was a strict disciplinarian and employed corporal punishment. Stephensen was nicknamed "Chicken" at school, due to his surname containing the word "hen". In his first year he had his wrist broken in a hazing ritual. He became a platoon leader in the school cadets and was also a talented sportsman, captaining the school's cricket and football teams and winning prizes for athletics. In 1916 he won a two-year extension to his scholarship by passing the junior public examination. Stephensen was chosen as a prefect in 1918, his fourth and final year at the school. For a brief period he was taught by V. Gordon Childe, whose socialist and pacifist beliefs prompted community opposition and led to his early resignation. Towards the end of the year, Stephensen led a student boycott of the school's speech day, at which the annual prizes were to be handed out by the state treasurer Ted Theodore. The boycott was in protest at the sacking of Wallace by the board of trustees.

In 1919, aged 17, Stephensen moved to Brisbane and enrolled in the University of Queensland. He was a fee-paying student as he had failed to win one of the few scholarships then available. He boarded at St John's College, where he soon received the nickname "Inky" for his habit of singing the chorus from "Mademoiselle from Armentières". Stephensen befriended Jack Lindsay, son of Norman Lindsay, who in turn introduced him to Theodore Whitherby. He also became involved with the Workers' Educational Association (WEA) and developed a friendship with Fred Paterson, who would later become the only Communist Party MP elected to an Australian parliament. In June 1919 Stephensen's first published article in the University Magazine called for the "fostering of a national literature" and greater study of Australian poets, themes he would return to later in his career.

Stephensen joined the Communist Party of Australia in 1921. He gained a second-class honours degree in Modern Greats at Queen's College, Oxford where he studied as a Rhodes Scholar and was a member of the university branch of the Communist Party with A. J. P. Taylor, Graham Greene and Tom Driberg.

== Literary work ==
Stephensen was a friend of D. H. Lawrence and edited the first uncensored version of Lady Chatterley's Lover. He was also friendly with Aldous Huxley.

His most significant work was The Foundations of Culture in Australia (1936), which led to the foundation of the Jindyworobak Movement.

Between the world wars, his Fellowship of Australian Writers released a document that advocated disconnection from the United States and stated, "US comics promoted demonology, witchcraft and voodooism, with Superman part of a raving mad view of the world". Of American musicals and minstrel shows, he wrote: "the American negro, with his jungle is not welcome here". He was also noted for his antisemitic views in this period. However, Stephensen was a supporter of Aboriginal rights, and he and his colleague, retired businessman W. J. Miles, financed the first Aboriginal publication, The Abo Call, written and edited by Aboriginal activist Jack Patten.

He edited all but four of the books of writer Frank Clune.

== Far-right politics ==
In 1936, Stephensen and Miles founded a magazine, The Publicist, which promulgated monarchical, pro-fascist, antisemitic, anti-Communist and pro-Aboriginal views. In the early 1940s, Miles curtailed his activities, due to increasing ill health. Stephensen founded the Australia First Movement in October 1941, and took over the editorship of the magazine in early 1942, shortly before being interned at the Loveday Camp in rural South Australia without trial, along with other members of the Australia First Movement, for pro-Japanese and Axis sympathies.

== Bibliography ==
Stephensen was a prolific author. He published over 30 books, as well as translations of works by Vladimir Lenin and Friedrich Nietzsche. He also produced nearly 70 books ghostwritten for Frank Clune.

Non fiction

- The Bushwackers: Sketches of Life in the Australian Outback (London: Mandrake Press, [1929?])
- The Legend of Aleister Crowley (London: Mandrake Press, 1930)
- The Foundations of Culture in Australia: An Essay Towards National Self Respect (Gordon, N.S.W.: W.J. Miles, 1936)
- The History and Description of Sydney Harbour (Adelaide: Rigby, 1966)
