= Hutton v West Cork Rly Co =

West Cork Railway

Hutton v West Cork Railway Co
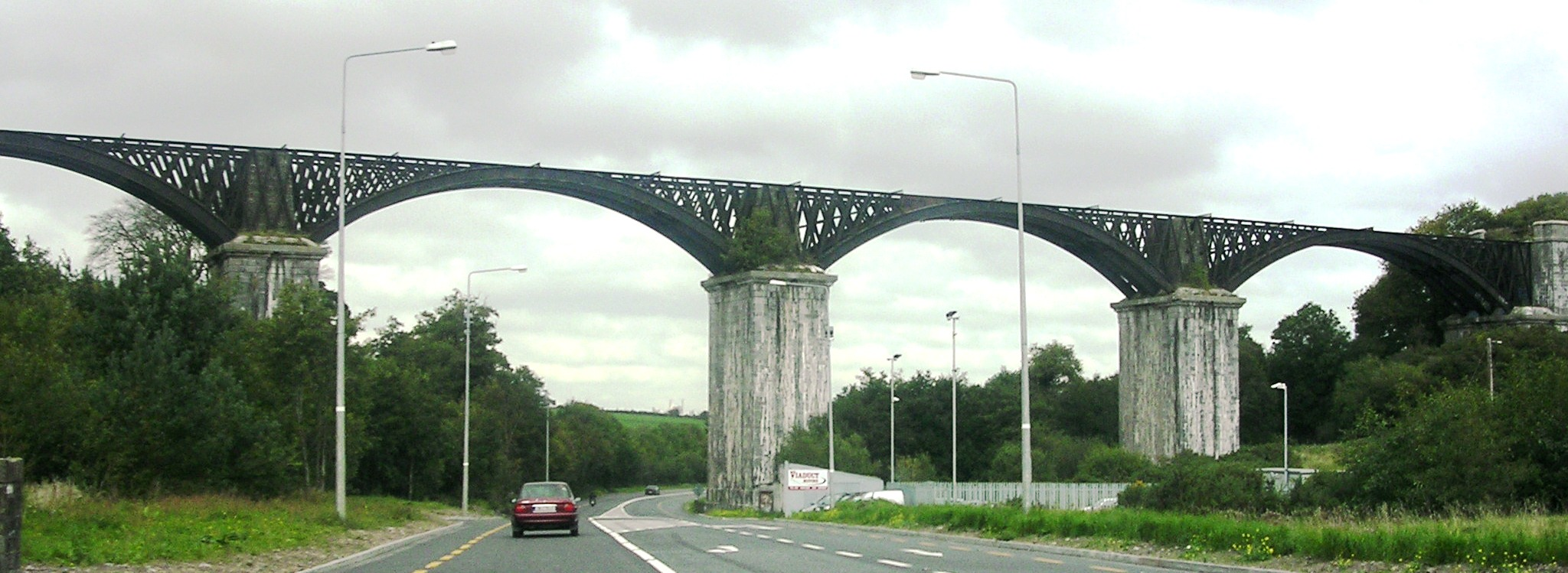
- Court: Court of Appeal
- Citation: (1883) 23 Ch D 654

Case opinions
- Bowen LJ, Cotton LJ and Baggallay LJ (dissenting)

Keywords
- Insolvency, provision for employees

Hutton v West Cork Railway Co (1883) 23 Ch D 654 is a UK company law case, which concerns the limits of a director's discretion to spend company funds for the benefit of non-shareholders. It was decided in relation to employees in the context of a company's insolvency proceedings.

The case's practical significance was limited by cases and statute as in Re Horsley & Weight Ltd [1982] Ch 442 where the Court of Appeal held that a company's substantive object may include making gifts, and under Companies Act 2006, section 172 which entitles and obliges directors to regard interests other than shareholders as a proper exercise of their power.

== Facts ==
According to the law report,

A railway company which had no provision in its articles for paying remuneration to directors, and had never paid any, sold its undertaking to another company at a price to be determined by an arbitrator. By the Act authorizing the transfer it was provided that on the completion of the transfer the company should be dissolved except for the purpose of regulating their internal affairs and winding up the same and of dividing the purchase-money. The purchase-money was to be applied in paying the costs of the arbitration and in paying off any revenue debts or charges of the company, and the residue was to be divided among the debenture holders and shareholders. After the completion of the transfer a general meeting of the company was held at which a resolution was passed to apply £1,050 of the purchase-money in compensating the paid officials of the company for their loss of employment, although they had no legal claim for any compensation, and £,1500 in remuneration to the directors for their past services.

== Judgment ==
Cotton LJ and Bowen LJ held that the money payment was invalid. Baggallay LJ dissented. In the course of his dicta, Bowen LJ held that there is..

...a kind of charitable dealing which is for the interest of those who practise it, and to that extent and in that garb (I admit not a very philanthropic garb) charity may sit at the board, but for no other purpose.

So according to Bowen LJ, directors can only spend,

money which is not theirs but the company’s, if they are spending it for the purposes which are reasonably incidental to the carrying on of the business of the company. That is the general doctrine. Bona fides cannot be the sole test, otherwise you might have a lunatic conducting the affairs of the company, and paying away its money with both hands in a manner perfectly bona fide yet perfectly irrational… It is for the directors to judge, provided it is a matter which is reasonably incidental to the carrying on of the business of the company… The law does not say that there are to be no cakes and ale, but there are to be no cakes and ale except such as are required for the benefit of the company.

The upshot for a company in insolvency was that directors were not free to make payments to employees, because payments could only be made which were incidental to the business, and an insolvent business had no further business. In English law, the position has been altered by the Insolvency Act 1986, s.187 and the Companies Act 2006, s.247, which allow directors to consider employees directly when a company has gone insolvent.

== Significance ==
The value of the judgment today lies in the general doctrine that during the life of the company, it may conduct itself in a way which benefits stakeholders other than shareholders, but only insofar as that will in the end, albeit indirectly, be in the shareholders' interest. See now, section 172 Companies Act 2006.

== Subsequent case law ==
- Miles v Sydney Meat-Preserving Co Ltd [1912] HCA 87, (1912) 16 CLR 50 (affirmed on other grounds in William John Miles v The Sydney Meat Preserving Company Limited and others [1913] UKPC 74, (1913) 17 CLR 639) held that a company could be run with strict adherence to serving only the shareholders.
- Evans v Brunner, Mond and Co Ltd [1921] 1 Ch 359, a chemical company’s general meeting approved directors donating £100,000 to universities for science. A shareholder challenged the resolution. He argued any benefit (a better pool of potential employees) was too remote. But he lost.
- AP Smith Manufacturing Co v Barlow, 39 ALR 2d 1179 (1953) (appeal dismissed 346 U.S.C. 861 (1953)) the court applauded a gift to Princeton University as ‘long visioned… action in recognising and voluntarily discharging its high obligations as a constituent of our modern society.’
- Regentcrest plc v Cohen [2001] 2 BCLC 80, per Jonathan Parker LJ, at para 120, "No doubt, where it is clear that the act or omission under challenge resulted in substantial detriment to the company, the director will have a harder task persuading the court that he honestly believed it to be in the company's interest; but that does not detract from the subjective nature of the test." But also, at para 153, "Thus, the need to avoid litigation against two of Regentcrest's directors was, I find, a weighty consideration, and one which could reasonably have led a businessman in the position of the Richardson brothers on 5 September 1990 to conclude that the waiver of the claim on the terms proposed was in the interests of Regentcrest, notwithstanding that the information before the board as to the vendors' ability to meet any judgment was far from complete. As to that, it is in my judgment wholly unrealistic to have expected Mr Roy Richardson at that stage to have initiated a detailed investigation into the personal financial circumstances of the vendors."

== See also ==
- UK company law
