= Australia First =

Australia First may refer to:

- Australia First Movement (founded 1941)
- Australia First Party (founded 1996)
