= Bea Miles =

Australian bohemian rebel

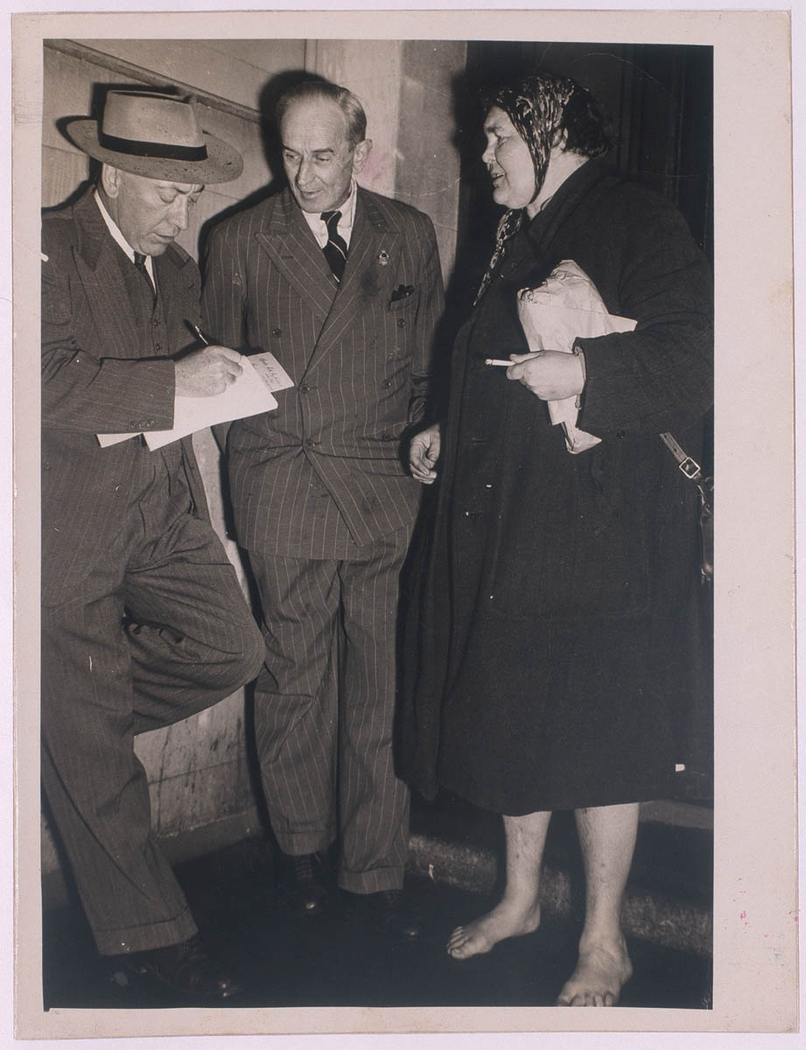
- Bea Miles (right) in the early 1940s
- Born: 17 September 1902; Ashfield, Sydney, New South Wales
- Died: 3 December 1973 (aged 71); Randwick, Sydney
- Burial place: Rookwood Cemetery
- Education: Abbotsleigh School
- Known for: Bohemian rebel
- Relatives: William John Miles (father)

Beatrice Miles (also known as Bee Miles) (17 September 1902 – 3 December 1973) was an Australian eccentric and bohemian rebel. Described as Sydney's "iconic eccentric", she was known for her contentious relationships with the city's taxi drivers and for her ability to quote any passage from Shakespeare for money.

== Biography ==
Born in Ashfield, New South Wales, to Maria Louisa Miles (née Binnington), and the third of five surviving children, she grew up in the Sydney suburb of St Ives. Her father, William John Miles, was a wealthy public accountant and hot-headed businessman, who had a tempestuous relationship with his daughter. She studied at Abbotsleigh School and enrolled in an arts course, but opted out, citing a lack of Australian subject matter. Miles also enrolled in medicine, which was unusual for women at that time, but she contracted encephalitis lethargica in her first year. The disease permanently and profoundly changed her personality, although not her intelligence, and she was unable to finish her studies and became an eccentric and notorious identity in and around Sydney.

In 1923, tired of his daughter's bohemian behaviour and lifestyle, Miles' father had her committed to a hospital for the insane, in Gladesville, New South Wales, where she stayed for two years. After that Miles lived on the street and was known for her outrageous behaviour. She was arrested many times and claimed to have been "falsely convicted 195 times, fairly 100 times". For a while Miles was living in a cave behind one of the Sydney beaches. She received a small monthly income from her father's estate and she drew on this to pay her debts. It was said that she always carried a A£5 note pinned to her skirts, so that the police could not arrest her for vagrancy.

Miles and her brother John joined the far-right Australia First Movement in 1941, at which time she gave an address in Elizabeth Bay on her membership application. Her father had been associated with extremist causes for a number of years, however there are no records of her having any involvement in the movement's activities and she was not among the members of the movement interned in 1942.

Miles' most notorious escapades involved taxi drivers. She regularly refused to pay fares. Some drivers refused to pick her up and she would sometimes damage the cab in retaliation, including reputedly ripping a door off its hinges once. In 1955, Miles took a taxi to Perth, Western Australia, and back. That time, she did pay the fare, which was A£600. On Christmas Day, 1956, she interrupted a taxi driver's festive dinner to demand he drive her to Broken Hill via Melbourne. On their return to Sydney she paid the fare of £73 10s. It is also said she would sit in a Sydney bank smoking cigarettes under a sign reading "Gentlemen will refrain from smoking". Music-lovers who attended the regular free Sunday-afternoon concerts given in the Sydney Town Hall by the Sydney Symphony Orchestra might recall how, just before the performance began, Miles often appeared and wandered down the centre aisle, calling out "Ruby? Ruby?"

Miles was well-educated, and very widely read. She was legendary as a fast and voracious reader throughout her life, even in her declining years, and reputedly read an average of two books every day. She spent a lot of time reading in the State Library of New South Wales, until being banned in the late 1950s. Miles was also seen regularly standing on street corners with a sign offering to quote verses from Shakespeare for between sixpence and three shillings. Miles' writings are in the State Library, some in her own handwriting. They are: Dictionary by a Bitch, I Go on a Wild Goose Chase, I Leave in a Hurry, For We Are Young and Free, Notes on Sydney Monuments and Advance Australia Fair. An additional corrected typescript copy of 'Prelude to Freedom (Part 1) of Advance Australia Fair is in the University of Sydney Library collection. Fiercely patriotic, at twelve years of age Miles wore a "No Conscription" badge to school during the campaign leading up to the conscription plebiscite during World War I. In another incident Miles was disgusted when she was severely marked down for an essay about Gallipoli, which she described as a 'strategical blunder', rather than 'a wonderful war effort'.

Some time in the 1950s, Miles came to regard the environs of the rectory (then referred to as "the Clergy House") of Christ Church St Laurence as her home. She had previously been allowed to sleep in one of the porticos of St James' King Street, Sydney, but one of the clergy there had ordered her to leave. After sleeping in Belmore Park, where she was sometimes subject to arrest, the rector of Christ Church, Father John Hope, who was often called upon to bail her out, offered her a spot on the porch between the rectory dining room and the church vestry. Clergy entering the vestry to vest for mass would have to step over Miles, who rose late and went to bed early. From her position on the porch, Miles could hear the hymn singing at evensong (she requested that the nearby church windows remain open) and joined in dining room conversations as it suited her. A dogmatic atheist, she often gave altar servers and others a lecture on rationalism. Following a spell in Long Bay Gaol, after she had wrenched the door off a taxi when the driver refused her entry, it was agreed she could sleep in the rectory laundry, close to the kitchen, and she remained there until Father Hope's retirement in 1964.

Miles was constantly harassed by police and claimed to have been falsely convicted 195 times, fairly 100 times, though obituaries give lower estimates. She haunted the Public Library of New South Wales, reading many books each week, until she was banned from the building in the late 1950s.

As ill-health started to catch up with her, Miles spent the last nine years of her life in the Little Sisters of the Poor Home for the Aged in Randwick. She supposedly told the sisters that she had "no allergies that I know of, one complex, no delusions, two inhibitions, no neuroses, three phobias, no superstitions and no frustrations". After admission to the Little Sisters of the Poor, Miles would visit her old friend Father Hope in a taxi owned by a friendly driver. While in Randwick she borrowed an average of 14 books a week from the Randwick Branch Library. One of the Sisters of the Poor recalled that Miles came to be known for her compassion for the sick, comforting the old and infirm and sitting patiently with the dying. She even prayed with them, on one occasion, when questioned, observing "I don't believe in God, but she does."

Miles died on 3 December 1973, aged 71, from cancer. Australian wildflowers were placed on her coffin, while a jazz band played "Waltzing Matilda" and "Advance Australia Fair". It was suggested that Miles had renounced her lifelong atheism and become a Catholic before her death, but her family do not support this claim. Miles is interred at Rookwood Cemetery in the family plot.

== Popular culture and media ==
As Miles was a well-known figure in Sydney society, in 1961 a portrait of her by Alex Robertson was entered for the Archibald Prize. A musical based on her life, Better known as Bee, was first performed in 1984. The 1985 novel Lilian's Story by Kate Grenville was loosely based on her life; and was turned into a movie in 1995 starring Toni Collette and Ruth Cracknell in the title roles.

Bea Miles makes a cameo appearance in Dorothy Hewett's 1958 novel of working-class Sydney, Bobbin Up. In Chapter 13 she is "Sydney's most famous woman". She steals oranges, hates taxi drivers and police, and has a sign on her back, "Shakespeare readings. Any speech on request ... 2/–." She duly performs "Hamlet's immortal soliloquy" for a passer-by.

A fictionalised version of Miles briefly appeared as a minor character in the 1978 Australian drama film The Night the Prowler (which also starred Ruth Cracknell), directed by Jim Sharman, with a screenplay by renowned author and playwright Patrick White. The "Miles" character – a cameo role by Dorothy Hewett – is not named, and is only briefly seen in a park at night, talking with the main character. However she is dressed in a manner very similar to Miles' characteristic style, with a large overcoat, tennis shoes and sun visor.

Bea Miles also features as a character in Australian poet Les Murray's poem 'The Quality of Sprawl', which celebrates the distinctive character of Australia. She is noted for travelling twelve hundred miles in a taxis 'on the proceeds of her two-bob-a-sonnet Shakespeare readings'. Her tour is admired for having, 'No Lewd Advances, No Hitting Animals, No Speeding'. And Murray concludes, 'an image of my country. And would that it were more so'. 'The Quality of Sprawl' first appeared in Murray's 1983 collection The People's Otherworld.

In 2023, Rose Ellis published a biography, Bee Miles: Australia's Famous Bohemian Rebel, and the Untold Story Behind the Legend. It was shortlisted for the 2024 National Biography Award.
