= Maryborough Boys Grammar School Building =

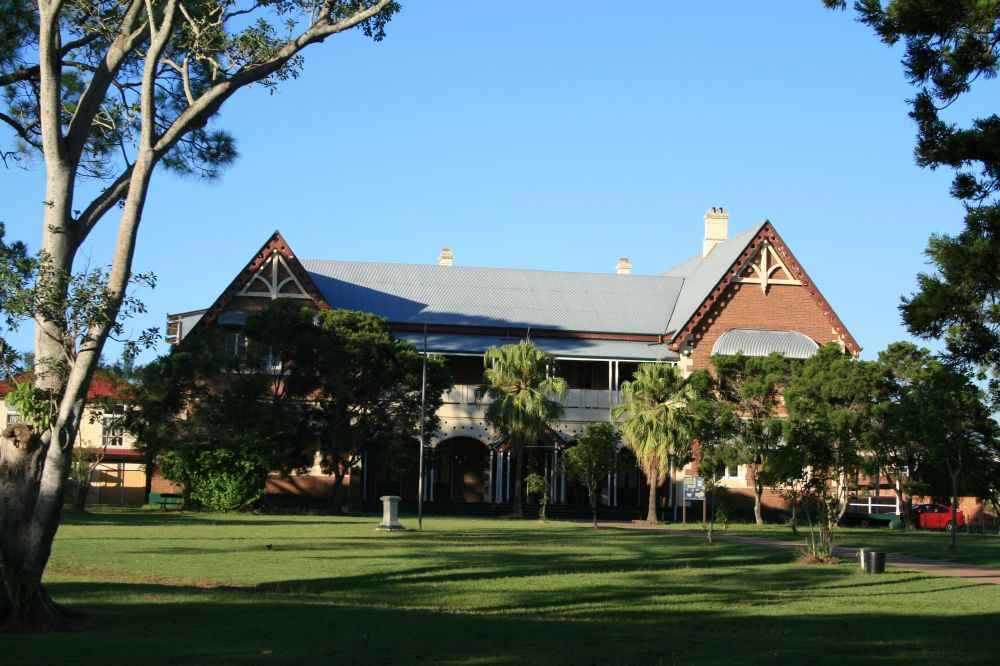
- Former Maryborough Boys' Grammar School from SW, 2009

- Location within Queensland
- 25.5337°S 152.6986°E
- Location: Kent Street, Maryborough, Fraser Coast Region, Queensland, Australia

History
- Design period: 1870s–1890s (late 19th century)
- Built: 1881

Site notes
- Architect: John Richard Hall
- Architectural style: Gothic

Queensland Heritage Register
- Official name: Maryborough Boys Grammar School (former), Adult Education Centre
- Type: state heritage (built)
- Designated: 21 October 1992
- Reference no.: 600697
- Significant period: 1880s–1890s (historical); 1880s–1900s (fabric)
- Significant components: school/school room
- Builders: H Taylor

Maryborough Boys Grammar School Building is a heritage-listed school building at Kent Street, Maryborough, Fraser Coast Region, Queensland, Australia. It was designed by John Richard Hall and built in 1881 by H Taylor. It is also known as Adult Education Centre. It was added to the Queensland Heritage Register on 21 October 1992.

== History ==
The former Maryborough Boys Grammar School was constructed in 1881 to the design of Brisbane architect, John Hall.

The passing of the Grammar School Act of 1860 provided that any Queensland town which could raise £1000 was entitled to the equivalent amount from the Queensland Government to support construction of a grammar school within the town. In February 1871 the desirability of establishing a grammar school in Maryborough was discussed by local gentlemen at the Maryborough School or Arts. The Maryborough Municipal Council supported the plan and agreed to provide the land from an existing council reserve. In March 1871 a public meeting in Maryborough chaired by the mayor of Maryborough enthusiastically supported the establishment of a grammar school and established a committee to raise the £1000 which would then be matched £2000 contributed by the Queensland Government to construct the school, noting that £420 had already been promised prior to the meeting. In November 1871, the Queensland Government officially reserved 7 acres (2.8 ha) 3 roods 22 perches (3,600 m^{2}) of land for the grammar school, the block bounded by Kent Street, John Street, Sussex Street and Fort Street. However, the raising of the funding made little progress after the initial enthusiasm and in February 1876 the land reserve was cancelled by the Queensland Government. In February 1877, the Queensland Premier George Thorn indicated that another portion of land would be made available if the grammar school proposal were to proceed, expressing his astonishment that a grammar school had not yet been established in Maryborough. These remarks led to a renewed effort by leading citizens to establish a grammar school resulting in over £900 being subscribed by April 1878 and £1340 by July 1878.

The trustees for the school were officially appointed in February 1879 by the Queensland Government. They were Henry Jardine Gray, Tom Penny, John Purser, William Walker, the Hon. Alfred Henry Brown, Robert Hart, and Richard Matthews Hyne. The trustees decided to close the building fund at £1500 which would enable them to obtain £3000 from the Queensland Government with the expectation that the building would cost £4000, leaving £500 for contingencies. A design competition for the school building was announced in June 1879 with prizes for the best and second best design to meet the following specifications:

"A two storeyed building with iron or slate roof, not to cost more than £4000. The school would require classrooms for fifty boys to be divided into not less than five classes. The quarters for the masters were to have six rooms with kitchen. The grammar school was to be built of brick and stone, and built on a level site having a good clad foundation."

In September 1879 it was announced that the eleven designs for the school had been received and that the trustees awarded first prize to Maryborough architect E.G. Porter with second prize awarded to Brisbane architect Arthur Josling. However, after forwarding the designs to the Queensland Government, in November 1879 the Queensland Colonial Architect F.D.G. Stanley declined both plans and advised the trustees to request Brisbane architect John Hall to prepare a design. Previously, John Hall was appointed as a foreman of works in the Queensland Colonial Architect's Office and began in private practice in by 1864. In 1868 he was appointed a licensed surveyor and took over superintending the outstanding work of Benjamin Backhouse, in particular the Brisbane Boys Grammar School. As a private architect, Hall designed fine buildings throughout Queensland including buildings for the Queensland National Bank for which he was architect; residences including "Greylands" (Indooroopilly, Brisbane), "Langlands" (East Brisbane) and "Pahroombin" (Bowen Hills), commercial projects, churches and hotels. Architects who had submitted plans to the design competition were outraged at Stanley's interference in the process.

In parallel to the design issues, in August 1879, the question of whether the school would accept both boys and girls or just boys arose. In November 1879, concerns were raised that the proposed location near the Ululah Lagoon was too far from the town and close to a pub with a site in Kent Street near the original land reserve being preferred. Concerns were also raised that students would be unable to resist bathing, fishing and boating on the lagoon leading to drownings and that the "vapory exhalations and malarious gases" rising from the lagoon would worsen the health of students with respiratory problems.

On 6 March 1880, the trustees called for tenders based on John Hall's design, although the site was still not decided. A public meeting on 10 March voted 26 to 17 (with many abstaining) against the Ululah site and this was communicated to the Queensland Minister for Education. Although there had been the intention to vote on the motion in favour of requesting the Queensland Government to give them the 10-acre (4.0 ha) site bounded by Sussex Street, Ferry Street and Kent Street, which was adjacent to the original site (on which the Maryborough Central State School had been built), the meeting degenerated into disarray and the motion was not put. However a subsequent meeting on 22 March 1880 carried the motion in favour of the "Kent Street site" as it had become known; this was also communicated to the Queensland Minister for Education.

On 16 April 1880 the trustees decided to call for a fresh set of tenders for construction of the school, hoping that the site would have been decided before the tenders were assessed on 8 May. However, the Minister for Education, Arthur Hunter Palmer, was reluctant to make a decision given the disagreement within the community and among the trustees and asked the trustees to establish the majority view of those who had contributed over £5 to the building fund. At the tender deadline of 8 May, the site was still undecided, so the tender date was postponed to 15 May.

Despite having neither a site nor a contractor, the trustees nonetheless announced that the Maryborough Grammar School would open in February 1881 and that they would be advertising for a resident head master (salary £500 per annum), a non-resident second master (£400 p.a.), a non-resident third master (£300 p.a) and a "lady principal" (£300 per annum). Although the proposed appointment of the lady principal suggests the trustees' intention to offer education to girls as well as boys, there was in parallel a proposal to use any surplus funds towards establishing a girls' grammar school.

On 18 June 1880 the trustees accepted a tender from builder H Taylor but still had no site for the school. On 10 July 1880 the ten-acre site on Kent Street (adjacent to the Maryborough Central State School) was gazetted by the Queensland Government. Finally the construction of the school commenced.

In early December 1880, the trustees advertised the positions of head master and second master with applications to close at the end of February 1881. In February 1881, the trustees commenced advertising for the "lady principal" for the Girls' Grammar School. In early March the trustees commenced their assessment of the 130 applications for the masters' positions, resulting in the appointment of James Murdoch, professor of Greek at Aberdeen University, as headmaster and Arthur Hughes (Bachelor of Arts from Cambridge University) as second master.

In April 1881, it was announced that the subscriptions for the Girls' Grammar School had reached £100/0/0o that application could be made to the Queensland Government for their subsidy towards the construction of the girls' school. By July 1881, plans for the girls' building were submitted for approval. The lady principal, Miss Budget, travelled from Melbourne via Sydney to Maryborough arriving in early August, followed by head master Prof Murdoch and family. Murdoch almost immediately left for Brisbane to consult with Reginald Heber Roe, the principal at Brisbane Grammar School.

In June 1881, it was announced that Maryborough Grammar School would open on 5 September 1881. In August 1881, it was confirmed that both boys and girls could be enrolled and, although the school was not built with a boarding facility, that boarding arrangements were in place "under the immediate supervision of the school". As announced, the school opened on 5 September 1881 with little ceremony, with only a short speech by the chairman of the trustees and a few words from Prof Murdoch to some assembled citizens and the 50 initial students (24 boys and 26 girls).

In September 1881, a piece of land 4 acres (1.6 ha) 15 perches (380 m^{2}) was reserved as the site for the girls' school. The girls' school was directly across Kent Street from the boys' school. In October 1881, the Queensland Government gave its approval of the plans so building work could commence and two new "lady teachers" recruited.

The building is now used for adult vocational education.

== Description ==
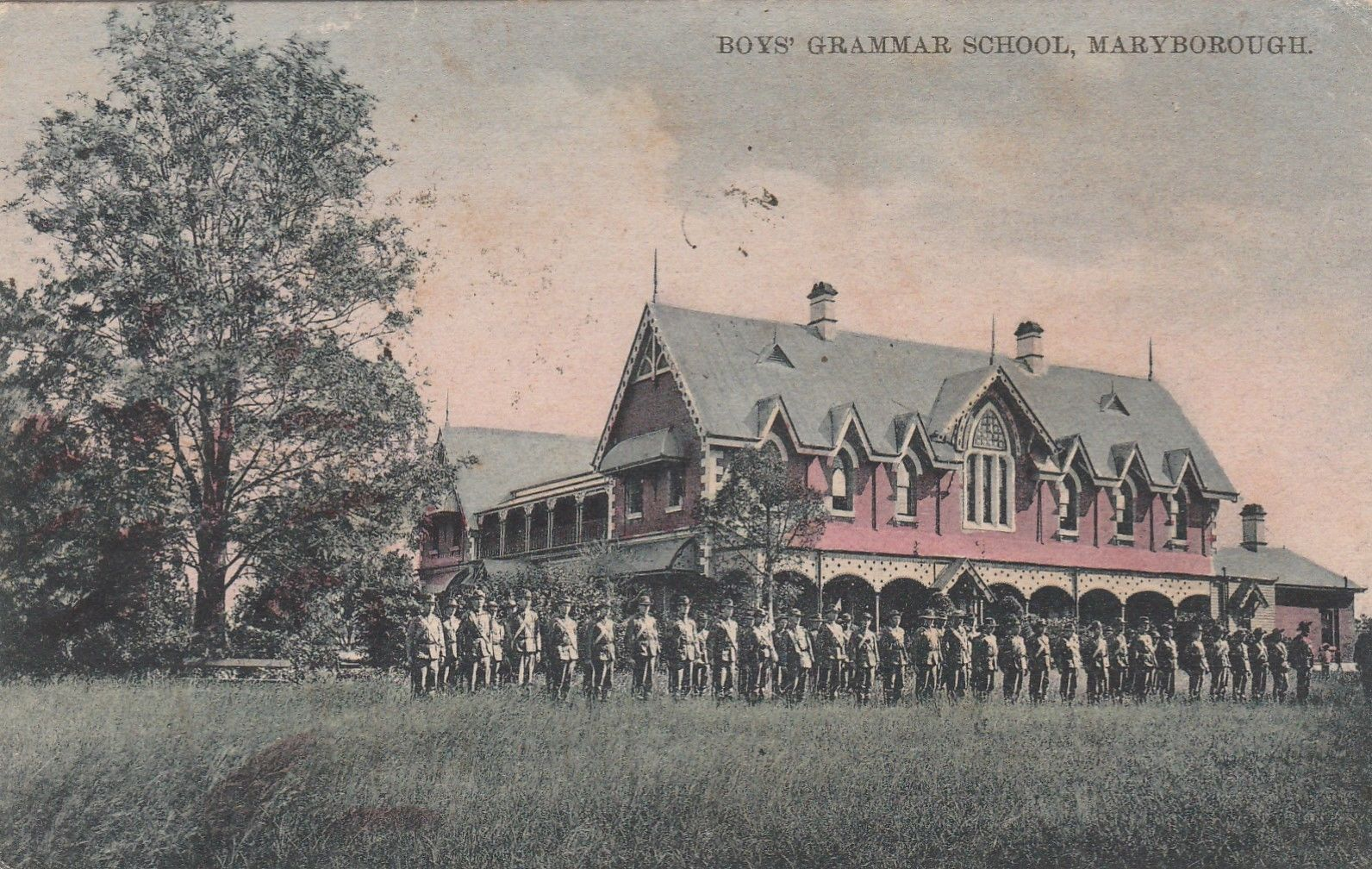
Maryborough Grammar School, circa 1908

The former Maryborough Boys Grammar School building is a substantial two storeyed, symmetrically arranged building sited on the rise of a large allotment on the western outskirts of the present central business area of Maryborough.

The building is a well-composed example of high Victorian Gothic, with architectural language of pointed arched windows, steeply pitched gabled roofs, decorative brickwork and picturesque massing and siting.

The Grammar School is symmetrically composed and faces the former Maryborough Girls' Grammar School which was on the opposite side of Kent Street. The building comprises two steeply pitched gabled roofed bays linked by a central bay with hipped roof. The construction is load bearing red face brick with rendered quoining and detailing. The roof of the building is clad with recent corrugated iron. Penetrating the eaves of the roofs of the end bays are large central gabled projections shading openings surmounted by pointed arched decorative panels. These elements are flanked by groups of three smaller gables also with pointed arched openings. The building features one-storeyed verandahs, with skillion awnings supported on timber columns linked by a substantial scalloped valance of vertical timber boarding with decorative cut outs.

At the time of the building's completion, local opinion was not in favour of its design. The local newspaper, the Maryborough Chronicle, praised the spacious dimensions of the classrooms and large lecture room, but criticised the overly small windows describing them as "jail windows" and disliked almost all aspects of the external appearance (using words such as "freak", "ponderous", "excrescences", "ugliness", "lopsided" and "promiscuousness") and suggested the overall architectural style was "Modern Chaotic", which the newspaper attributed to the amount of interference in the design process. The excellent view from the upper windows into the interior of the water closets in an outhouse building was also noted.

== Heritage listing ==
The former Maryborough Boys Grammar School Building was listed on the Queensland Heritage Register on 21 October 1992 having satisfied the following criteria.

The former Boys Grammar School demonstrates the growth of Maryborough in the 1870s and 1880s when the town was large enough to raise sufficient funding to erect a substantial Grammar School, second only to that in Brisbane.

The building is an accomplished example of the nineteenth century architectural style, Gothic Revival, as applied to an academic building. The steeply pitched roofs; siting; Gothic detailing including pointed arched openings and polychrome masonry detailing; and massing of the building contribute to Gothic Revival styling. The building is characteristic of Grammar Schools throughout Queensland constructed in this style.

The building is of architectural merit as an example of a Gothic Revival structure, adapted to the subtropical Maryborough climate. The building is a landmark in the town.

It has a special association with the town as a place of public education since the late nineteenth century.
