= AP Smith Manufacturing Co. v. Barlow =

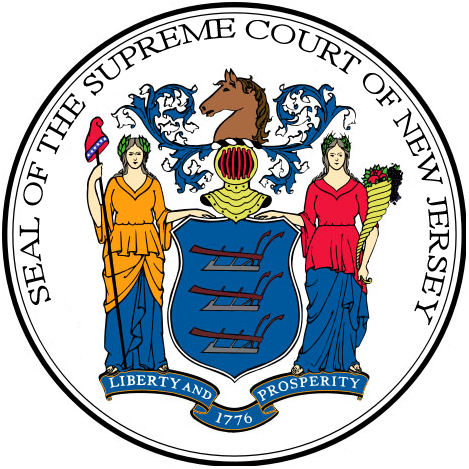
- Court: Supreme Court of New Jersey
- Citations: 13 N.J. 145, 98 A.2d 581, 39 A.L.R. 2d 1179 (1953)

Case history
- Prior action: 26 N.J. Super. 106, 97 A.2d 186 (App. Div. 1953)

Keywords
- Directors' duties

AP Smith Manufacturing Co. v. Barlow, 13 N.J. 145, 98 A.2d 581 (N.J. 1953), is a US corporate law case, concerning the application of directors' duties in regard to balancing the interests of different stakeholders. It held that directors may make charitable donations, so long as their personal interests do not conflict, or there is a contravention of state law.

== Facts ==
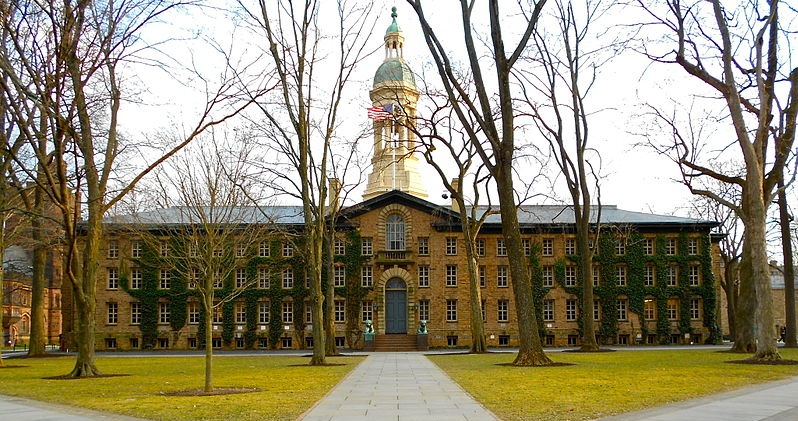
Nassau Hall at Princeton

The directors of AP Smith Manufacturing, a New Jersey company making fire hydrants in East Orange, approved donation of $1,500 (equivalent to $17,600 in 2024) to Princeton University. The shareholders disapproved of the gift and contended that it was a breach of a director's duty to act in the corporation or shareholder interests. Specifically they argued that there was no express authority in the corporation's certificate of incorporation. A New Jersey statute allowed corporations to make charitable donations, so long as the recipient did not own more than 10 per cent of a corporation's stock, but the shareholders argued this was inapplicable if the corporation was incorporated beforehand.

== Judgment ==
The Court held the gift was within the competence of the company and lauded it as a 'long visioned... action in recognizing and voluntarily discharging its high obligations as a constituent of our modern society.' It continued as follows.

State legislation adopted in the public interest and applied to pre-existing corporations under the reserved power has repeatedly been sustained by the Supreme Court.

[...]

In the light of all of the foregoing we have no hesitancy in sustaining the validity of the donation by the plaintiff. There is no suggestion that it was made indiscriminately or to a pet charity of the corporate directors in furtherance of personal rather than corporate ends.

== Legacy ==
Together with the earlier English case of Hutton v West Cork Rly Co (1883) and Australian case of Miles v Sydney Meat-Preserving Co Ltd (1912), AP Smith has been acknowledged as an early instance of legal recognition of corporate social responsibility.
