= Henry Tardent =

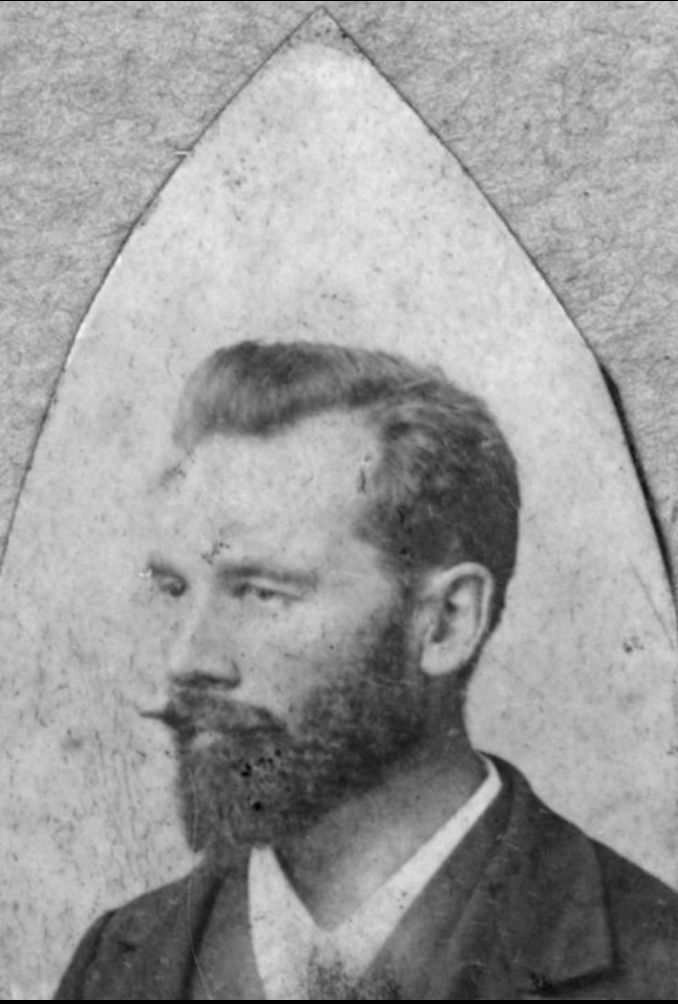
- Born: Henri Alexis Tardent; 1 March 1853; Le Sépey, Vaud, Switzerland
- Died: 5 September 1929 (aged 76); Wynnum, Queensland, Australia
- Education: Odessa University
- Occupations: Agricultural scientist, journalist
- Spouse: Hortense Tardent (m. 1876)
- Relatives: P. R. Stephensen (grandson)

Henry Alexis Tardent (1 March 1853 – 5 September 1929) was a Swiss-Australian writer and agricultural scientist in Queensland. He was politically left-wing and wrote for the labour-aligned Daily Standard for many years.

== Early life ==
Tardent was born on 1 March 1853 in Le Sépey, Vaud, Switzerland. He was the son of French speakers Marie Louise (née Perrod) and Marc Louis Samuel Tardent. His father was a veteran of the Sonderbund War.

After being educated in local schools, Tardent travelled through Eastern Europe and eventually matriculated from Odessa University with the degree of Bachelor of Arts. He spent time in Galicia and Bessarabia, learning Polish, German, Russian and Latin. He worked as a French teacher at a private school in Poland from 1869 to 1872 and then from 1874 to 1887 worked as a middle school teacher in Mykolaiv (present-day Ukraine), teaching French and German. In 1876 married Hortense Tardent, a distant relative, at the Swiss wine-growing colony in Chabag (present-day Ukraine).

== Move to Australia ==
Due to political instability and poor health, Tardent and his family immigrated to Australia in 1887. He established a farm and winery at Roma, Queensland, which he ran as a co-operative. He became a naturalised British subject in 1890. Following an economic downturn, in 1897 Tardent took up an appointment as manager of the Westbrook State Farm, an experimental farm near Toowoomba. He was transferred to the Biggenden State Farm in 1898, but resigned in 1901 when the state government objected to his political activities.

== Political activities and journalism career ==
Tardent was an early member of the Australian Labor Party (ALP). He stood for the party at the 1902 state election in the seat of Burnett. From 1904 to 1908 he was the publisher of the Toowoomba Democrat and Downs Agriculturist, while he ran an insurance business in Toowoomba. He moved to Atherton and became managing editor of the Tableland Examiner from 1909 to 1910. He was most prominent as the agricultural editor of the ALP-affiliated Daily Standard from 1913 until his death in 1929.

== Other activities ==
Tardent published a number of books across varying subjects, including biographies of George Essex Evans, Richard John Randall, and Ellis Rowan. He was a founding member of the Brisbane branch of the Alliance française. In March 1929, the French government awarded him the rank of Officier d'Académie in the Ordre des Palmes académiques.

Tardent was a major influence on his grandson P. R. Stephensen, who achieved some literary fame but was better known for his involvement with left-wing and right-wing extremist groups.
