= The Daily Standard (Brisbane) =

Newspaper published in Australia 1912–1936

- The final edition of The Daily Standard, 7 July 1936
- Type: Evening daily
- Format: Tabloid
- Founder(s): Queensland Labor Party; Australian Workers' Union
- Publisher: The Labor Daily Newspaper Co. Ltd.
- Editor: James Sharpe; Walter Russell Crampton; Henry Tardent; Walter Curtis Atkinson
- Notable contributors: Henry Tardent; Will Mahony
- Founded: December 10, 1912
- Ceased publication: July 7, 1936
- Headquarters: 232–234 Elizabeth Street, Brisbane
- City: Brisbane
- Country: Australia
- Price: Twopence (1936)

The Daily Standard was a newspaper published in Brisbane, Queensland, Australia from 1912 to 1936. The newspaper was closely affiliated with the Australian Labor Party (Queensland Branch) and the Australian Workers' Union.

The Daily Standard first emerged during the 1912 Brisbane General Strike, during which a daily bulletin was issued by the strike leaders. This developed into a small paper which was eventually formalised into the Daily Standard with establishment funding provided by the Labor Party and several trade unions.

The first editor of the paper was James Sharpe who served from the paper's inception in 1912 until his election to the Australian House of Representatives the following year.

The newspaper was published from its first edition on Tuesday 10 December 1912 through to its 7322nd edition on Tuesday 7 July 1936. One of its strongest supporters was Richard Sumner who actively promoted and put up his personal assets as a financial guarantee for it. Sumner was a board member for many years and chairman for several years.

The editors of The Daily Standard included:

- Walter Russell Crampton

Contributors to The Daily Standard included:

- Walter Russell Crampton, sometimes under the pseudonym of Jack Aster
- Henry Tardent, agricultural editor 1913–1929

== Digitisation ==
The paper has been digitised as part of the Australian Newspapers Digitisation Program of the National Library of Australia.

== Gallery ==
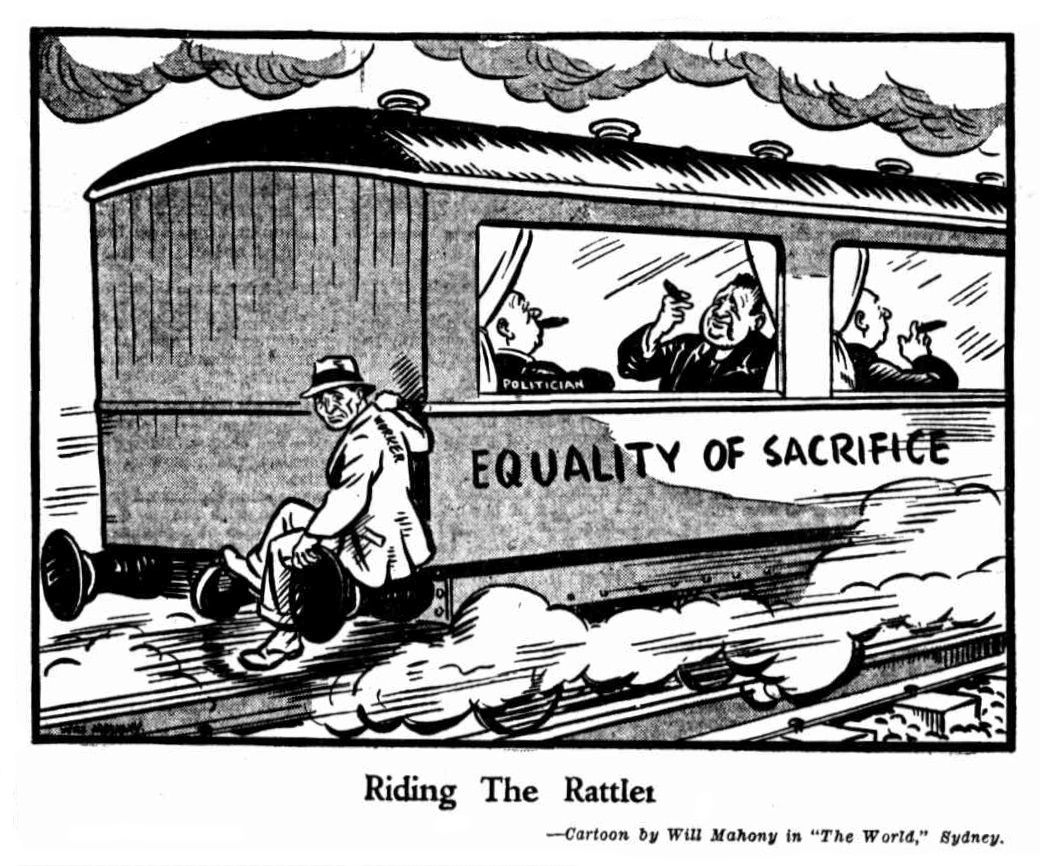
Riding the Rattler by Will Mahony, published in Daily Standard, 19 October 1932

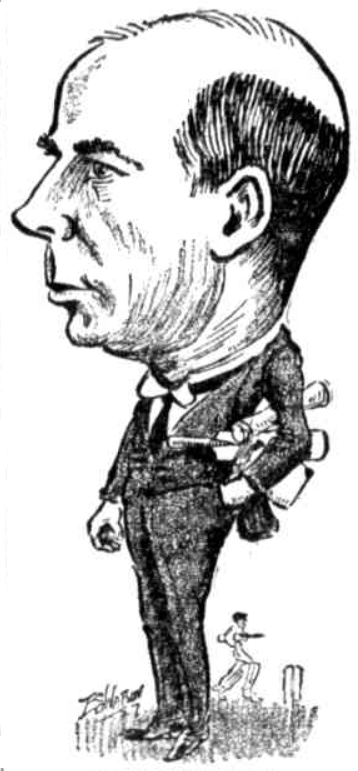
Caricature of Queensland cricketer Ernest Hutcheon, published in 1927

== See also ==
- Red Flag riots
- The Worker
