= Walter Russell Crampton =

Australian trade unionist, journalist, & politician (1877–1938)

The Hon Jack Crampton
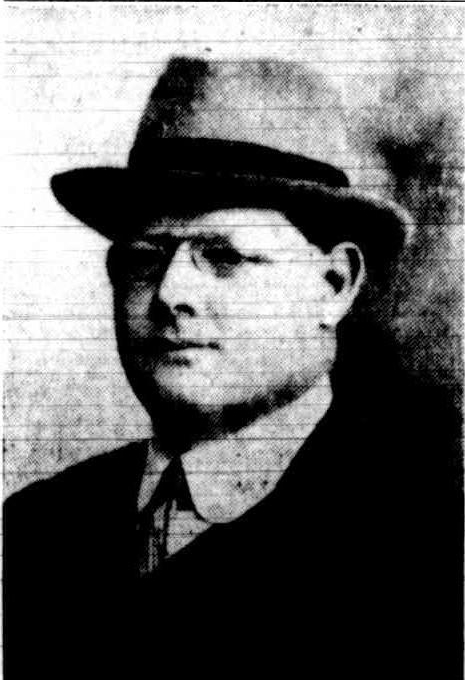

Member of the Queensland Legislative Council
- In office 10 October 1917 – 23 March 1922
- Succeeded by: house disbanded

Alderman on Brisbane City Council for Paddington Ward
- In office 1921–1925
- In office 1934–1937

Alderman on Brisbane City Council for Baroona Ward
- In office 1937–1938

Personal details
- Born: Walter Russell Crampton; 3 July 1877 Redfern, New South Wales, Australia
- Died: 20 October 1938 (aged 61) Brisbane, Queensland, Australia
- Party: Labor
- Spouse: Amy Maria Beadle (m.1903 d.1952)
- Occupation: Newspaper editor and general manager, Meatworker, Company director

Walter Russell (Jack) Crampton (3 July 1877 – 20 October 1938) was an Australian trade unionist, journalist and politician. He was a Member of the Queensland Legislative Council, until he voted (with others) to abolish the council.

== Personal life ==
Crampton was born in 1877 in Redfern, New South Wales, Australia, the eldest child of Walter James Crampton and Sarah Phillips.

He left school at age 14 and then "humped his swag" around western New South Wales. He came to Queensland in 1898.

He married Amy Maria Beadle on 2 January 1903 in Townsville, Queensland. They had five children: Raymond, Morrie, Madge, Jack and Jill.

He was commonly known as Jack Crampton.

Walter died on 20 October 1938 at Brisbane, Queensland after a short illness. He was cremated at the Mt Thompson Crematorium.

== Public life ==
In April 1892 Crampton joined the Slaughtermen's Union in April 1892, beginning a lifelong association with the union movement. He moved to Queensland in 1898 and was working as a meatworker in northern Queensland where he became concerned about the conditions of working men. In particular, he was concerned that many abattoirs would only employ workers on contracts that gave them no job security.

In 1904, he had moved to Brisbane and became the full-time organizer for the Australasian Federated Butchers' Employees' Union in 1908. In this role, he worked tirelessly to unionise the abattoirs of North Queensland. When managers would turn him away from their premises, he would slog through mud flats and bush to find a back entrance to the workplaces to talk with the workers.

Crampton sought to achieve greater unionisation in all workplaces. From 1910 to 1913, he was a member of the central political executive of the Australian Labor Federation. In 1911 he established the southern district branch of the Amalgamated Workers' Association and was involved in organising the sugar workers' strike at Mackay, Queensland. In 1912, he became President of the Brisbane branch of the Australian Labor Federation.

In 1912, Crampton stood for election as a member of the Labor for the Legislative Assembly of Queensland for the seat of Windsor, but was not successful. Instead he became secretary of the Queensland branch of Australasian Federated Butchers' Employees' Union.

He was a director of the newspapers The Daily Standard and The Worker, both of which were affiliated with the Australian Labour Party. In 1914, he resigned his roles with his union to work as a journalist on The Daily Standard, writing under the name Jack Aster.

In 1915–17 he was appointed to the public service as the director of labour, where he worked to reorganise the department.

In 1917 he returned to the Daily Standard as its general manager, a role he held until 1927.

In 1916–19 Crampton was a government representative on the Senate of the University of Queensland.

Jack Crampton was a member of Labor and was appointed to the Queensland Legislative Council on 10 October 1917. Although it was a lifetime appointment, the council was abolished on 23 March 1922. Jack Crampton was one of those who voted for its abolition, as it had been Labor Party policy to abolish the council for many years.

Crampton was an alderman of Brisbane City Council from 1921 to 1925 and then again from 1934 to 1937 in the Paddington Ward and from 1937 to his death in 1938 in the Baroona Ward. During this time, he served on the following committees:.

- Works Committee 1922–1924
- Health Committee 1922–1924
- Parks & Gardens Committee 1922–1924
- Lighting Committee 1922–1924
- Anzac Memorial Special Committee 1922–1924
- Markets & Wharves Committee 1922–1924
- Ferries & Baths Committee 1923–1924
- Finance Committee 1924–1925
- Buildings & Alignments of Roads Committee 1924–1925
- Legislative Committee 1924–1925
- Theatres & Entertainments Committee 1924–1925
- Town Hall Special Committee 1924–1925
- Health Committee 1936–1938
- Electricity Supply Committee 1936–1937
- Works Committee 1937–1938
- Parks Committee 1937–1938
- Water Supply & Sewerage Committee 1938
- Town Planning Committee 1937–1938 (chair)

== See also ==
- Members of the Queensland Legislative Council, 1917–1922
