= Miles v Sydney Meat-Preserving Co Ltd =

- Court: High Court of Australia
- Full case name: Miles v The Sydney Meat-Preserving Company (Limited) and Others
- Decided: 19 December 1912
- Citations: [1912] HCA 87 ; 16 CLR 50; 19 ALR 70; 13 SR (NSW) 537; 30 WN (NSW) 17

Case history
- Appealed from: Supreme Court of New South Wales
- Subsequent action: [1913] UKPC 74

Court membership
- Judges sitting: Griffith CJ; Barton & Isaacs JJ

Miles v Sydney Meat-Preserving Co Ltd was a 1912 decision of the High Court of Australia regarding directors' duties and shareholder primacy. Businessman William John Miles sued the company, of which he was a major shareholder, for its failure to pay out dividends. The court found by a 2–1 majority that there was no fiduciary duty of the board of directors to maximise shareholder value.

== Background ==
The Sydney Meat-Preserving Company (Limited) was established in 1871 by a private act of the parliament of New South Wales, for the purposes of "carrying on the business of meat preserving and disposing of and exporting the products". The operations of the company were governed by a deed of settlement which provided that a dividend should be paid to shareholders from the "clear bona fide net profits" of the company, although the board of directors could in its discretion set aside profits as retained earnings.

A majority of the shareholders of the company were graziers, and over time the operations of the company were conducted "not with a view to paying dividends to the members, but with a view to benefiting the pastoral industry generally". No dividends were ever paid, but funds were used to buy stock from graziers on non-commercial terms during periods of downturn. William John Miles, a major shareholder in the company who was not a grazier, brought an action in equity against the company and its four directors – William Wright Richardson, Walter Russell Hall, John Bassett Christian, and Lewis Porter Bain – seeking an injunction that would force the company to pay dividends. The case was brought before A. H. Simpson in the Supreme Court of New South Wales, who dismissed Miles' suit.

Miles retained Edward Fancourt Mitchell and Richard Clive Teece as his barristers, while the company retained David Maughan and the board of directors retained Adrian Knox.

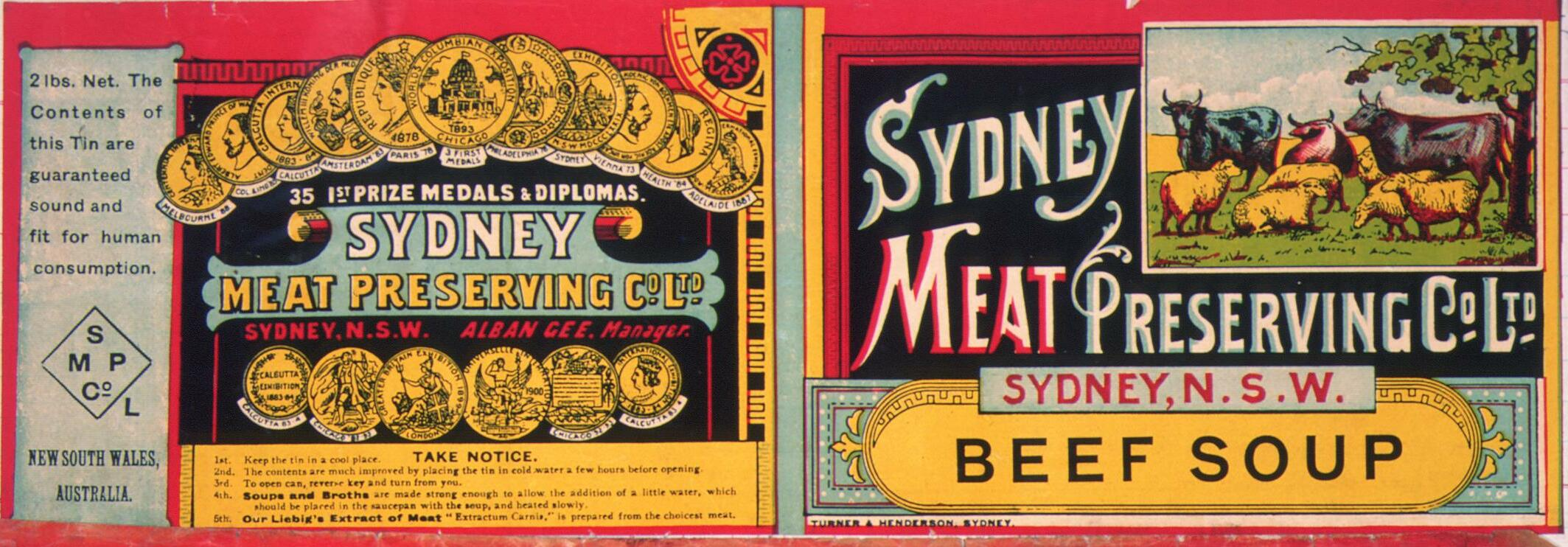
Labels used by the Sydney Meat-Preserving Company

== Ruling ==
Chief Justice Samuel Griffith, joined by Justice Edmund Barton, upheld the ruling of the Supreme Court. He stated that the board's failure to pay dividends was still within the spirit of the company's constitution, as the interests of the company were linked with the health of the industry as a whole. He observed that:

The law does not require the members of a company to divest themselves, in its management, of all altruistic motives, or to maintain the character of the company as a soulless and bowelless thing, or to exact the last farthing in its commercial dealings, or forbid them to carry on its operations in a way which they think conducive to the best interests of the community as a whole.

Justice Isaac Isaacs, in dissent, held that the board had adopted a consistent policy of withholding dividends and accumulating retained earnings, but that the policy which was no longer linked with the industry as a whole and was thus against the deed of settlement.

== Legacy ==
Griffith's comments around the duties of companies to their shareholders have been cited as an early articulation of stakeholder theory and rejection of absolute shareholder primacy. However, 20th-century Australian corporate law did not continue in this direction, but instead held that a company's interests were largely identical with those of its shareholders.

Together with the earlier English case of Hutton v West Cork Rly Co (1883) and the later U.S. case of AP Smith Manufacturing Co. v. Barlow (1953), Miles has been acknowledged as an early instance of legal recognition of corporate social responsibility.

The issue of shareholder rights to dividends was revisited in Sumiseki Materials Co Ltd v Wambo Coal Pty Ltd (2013), in which the Supreme Court of New South Wales recognised a shareholder's contractual right to a dividend under more narrow circumstances.

== See also ==
- Dodge v. Ford Motor Co.
- AP Smith Manufacturing Co. v. Barlow
