= Australia First Movement =

Fascist movement

- Abbreviation: AFM
- Formation: 20 October 1941; 85 years ago
- Dissolved: 1942
- Type: Political organisation
- Legal status: Defunct
- Headquarters: Sydney, New South Wales
- Region served: Australia
- Members: 65
- Official language: English
- President: Percy Stephensen
- Organiser: Adela Pankhurst Walsh
- Key people: • Ian Mudie • Rex Ingamells
- Main organ: • The Publicist

The Australia First Movement (AFM) was an extremist political movement founded in Sydney in October 1941, which advocated for isolationism and collaborationism during World War II and supported fascism and Nazism. It grew out of the Rationalist Association of New South Wales and the Victorian Socialist Party, and was led by former Rhodes scholar Percy Stephensen and Adela Pankhurst. It has been alleged that writer Miles Franklin was also involved in the AFM, as she attended three AFM public meetings in December 1941, and had long time literary associations and friendships with Stephenson, Herbert and Dark. However, historian Jill Roe has documented Franklin's clear opposition to the political views of the AFM in her 2008 biography of Stella Miles Franklin. The AFM was inspired by the activities of retired businessman William John Miles, who had campaigned during the 1930s under the "Australia First" slogan.

== Background ==
Between 1936 and 1942, retired businessman and far-right activist William John Miles published 16 volumes of a newsletter titled The Publicist, to which he contributed. He was a leading member of the Rationalist Association, and used The Publicist as his mouthpiece. Before 1939, it described itself as being "for national socialism" and "for Aryanism; against semitism". In January 1942, the ailing Miles transferred editorship of The Publicist to his co-author Stephensen, and had no involvement in the Australia First Movement, dying later that year.

== Formation and membership ==
The Australia First Movement was formally established on 20 October 1941 at the Shalimar Café in Sydney. Those present adopted a constitution and elected Stephensen as president, with Walter Tinker-Giles as treasurer and Sheila Rice as secretary. The other members of the executive committee were Ian Mudie, Gordon Rice, Vera Parkinson, Marjorie Corby and Elaine Pope. Adela Walsh and Les Cahill were appointed as paid organisers. Other notable members included poet Rex Ingamells and Odinist Alexander Rud Mills, who was the first official member in Victoria.

== Views ==
The Australia First Movement has been characterised as antisemitic, anti-war and pro-isolationist, and advocated Australia's independence from the British Empire. It attracted the support of the Catholic weekly, The Advocate, as well as the Odinist Alexander Rud Mills. By 1938, those who were later associated with the Australia First Movement were advocating a political alliance with the Axis powers of Germany, Italy and Japan. A number of its 65 members came from a far-left background: Stephensen, Pankhurst and Walsh were former Communists.

== Activities ==
During its short period of existence, the Australia First Movement held regular public meetings, published a manifesto and ten-point policy statement, and made attempts to recruit additional members by mail, largely from existing subscribes of The Publicist and acquaintances of existing members. Its first public meeting was held at the Australian Hall on 5 November 1941 with Stephensen and Walsh as the keynote speakers, reportedly attracting 212 attendees although a number of these were undercover police. The movement held weekly public meetings for the remainder of 1941, gathering at suburban halls around Sydney and attracting crowds of between 50 and 200 people.

A meeting at Adyar Hall on 19 February 1942 was disrupted by protesters and resulted in several brawls breaking out. Stephensen received facial injuries, including cuts and two black eyes. The incident received significant newspaper coverage. In the immediate aftermath, a number of venues refused to host the movement's meetings, including the Sydney Town Hall.

=== Initial government response ===
Many of the Australia First Movement's members had been under surveillance for years prior to the movement's formal creation, with their activities reported on and mail intercepted. The Publicist had been monitored by the Commonwealth Investigation Branch (CIB) and Military Intelligence (MI) since its formation.

The Military/Police Intelligence Branch (MPI) – a special branch of the New South Wales Police operating with support from the Australian military – quickly assessed the organisation as dangerous, with a report of the AFM's third meeting in November 1941 describing it as "the genesis of a Fifth Column of a most virulent kind". As the movement expanded into other states, the Victorian branch of the Commonwealth Security Service assessed the AFM as a "pro-Fascist, pro-Nazi, anti-Semitic organisation".

On 25 November 1941, Labor MP Max Falstein referred to the AFM in federal parliament as an "anti-war, anti-democratic, and pro-fascist organisation" and requested Attorney-General H. V. Evatt conduct a review of the movement. New South Wales premier William McKell wrote to Prime Minister John Curtin a day later asking for the AFM's activities to be restricted. An initial review of the movement by Evatt and Eric Longfield Lloyd concluded that the AFM seemed to comprise "old or ageing and eccentric persons with a zest for taking the unpopular side in discussions" and suggested its leadership only receive an official reprimand. However, the AFM's continued public activities after the attack on Pearl Harbor prompted a reassessment and in January 1941 the Security Service and MI applied for several ministerial orders under national security regulations restricting Stephensen and the AFM.

== Internment and aftermath ==
In March 1942, four members of the Australia First Movement in Perth, and sixteen in Sydney, were arrested, based on the suspicion that they would provide help to Japanese invaders. Documents indicated that those arrested were plotting to contact the Japanese armed forces, sabotaging vulnerable strategic area, surrender the Australian armed forces, assassinate prominent Australian political and military leaders, and execute those who opposed them. Two were convicted of conspiring to assist the enemy, and the others were interned for the duration of the war. Adela Pankhurst, of the famous suffragette family, had visited Japan in 1939 and was arrested and interned in 1942 for her advocacy of peace with Japan. In his official history of Australian involvement in the Second World War, Paul Hasluck criticised those internments as the "grossest infringement of individual liberty made during the war".

== Legacy ==
Winter (2005) has suggested that the far-right and antisemitic Australian League of Rights was the "natural heir" of the Australia First Movement and The Publicist.

== See also ==
- New Guard
- Centre Party
- Far-right politics in Australia
