= Maryborough School of Arts =

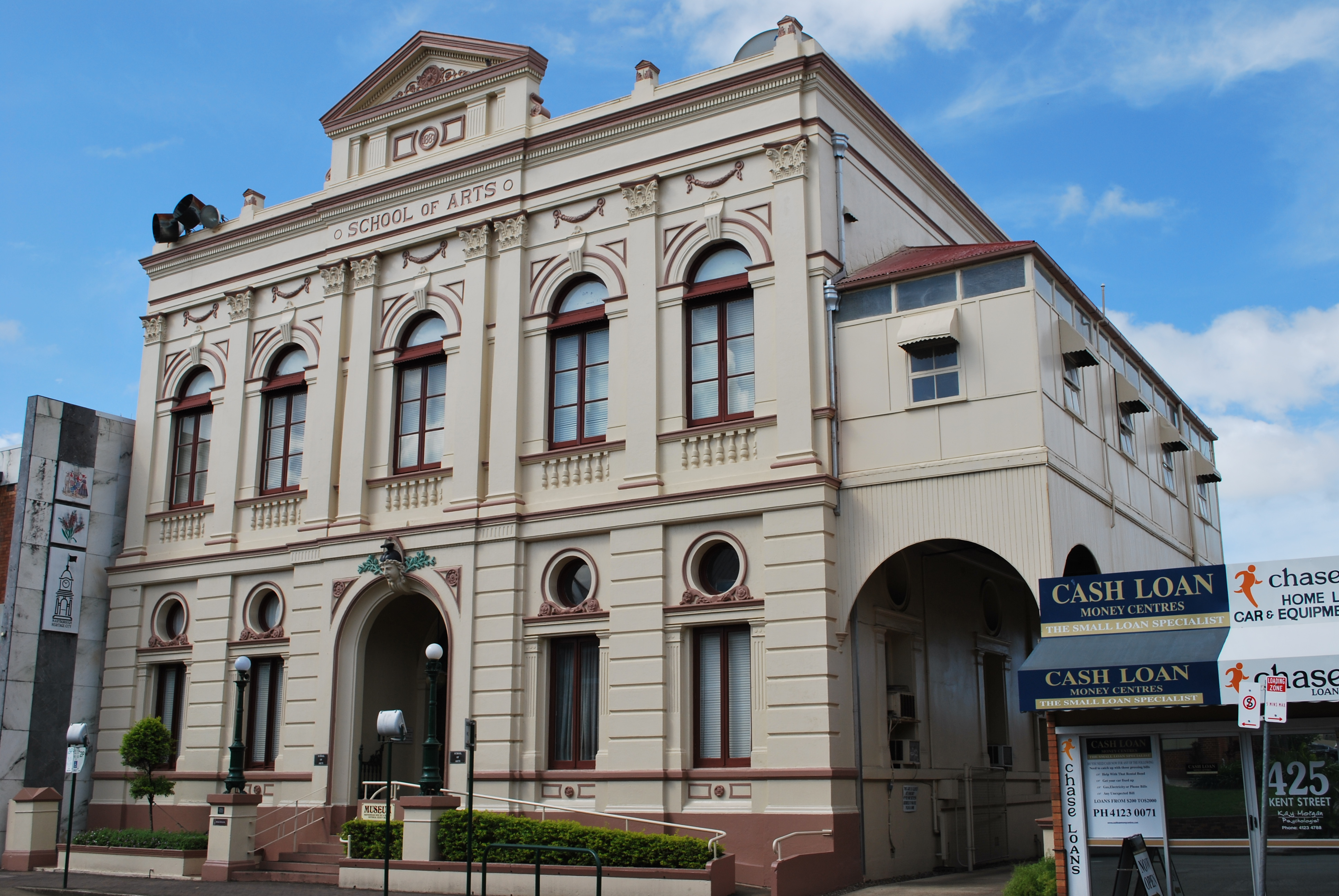
- Maryborough School of Arts, 2008

- Location within Queensland Location within Australia
- 25.5373°S 152.7024°E
- Location: 427 Kent Street, Maryborough, Fraser Coast Region, Queensland, Australia

History
- Design period: 1870s–1890s (late 19th century)
- Built: 1887–1888; Groundbreaking: 3 June 1887; Opened: 21 May 1888

Site notes
- Architect: John Harry Grainger
- Architectural style: Classicism
- Owner: Fraser Coast Regional Council

Queensland Heritage Register
- Official name: School of Arts, Maryborough School of Arts, Museum, Technical College and Recreation Club
- Type: state heritage (built)
- Designated: 21 October 1992
- Reference no.: 600701
- Significant period: 1880s–1920s (historical); 1940s (WWII historical); 1880s–1910s (fabric); 1880s–1920s (social)
- Significant components: School of Arts
- Builders: Jacob and John Rooney

Maryborough School of Arts is a heritage-listed School of Arts (Note: Schools of Arts were known throughout much of Australia, outside Queensland, as Mechanics' institutes. In Britain too, where they originated, most were called Mechanics' institutes. The names varied in many places, however. The founding institute of the movement, formed in 1821, was called the Edinburgh School of Arts.) building at 427 Kent Street, Maryborough, Fraser Coast Region, Queensland, Australia. It was designed by John Harry Grainger and built from 1887 to 1888 by Jacob & John Rooney. It is also known as Museum and Technical College and Recreation Club. It was added to the Queensland Heritage Register on 21 October 1992.

It is a two-storeyed masonry building opposite the City Hall. It replaced the first Maryborough School of Arts which was a small brick building constructed in 1861 soon after the establishment of a local School of Arts committee in 1860.

== Design ==
It is a smooth rendered brick building with a hipped roof. The principal, south western façade of the School of Arts, which addresses Kent Street, is symmetrically arranged and employs classical proportion and detailing.

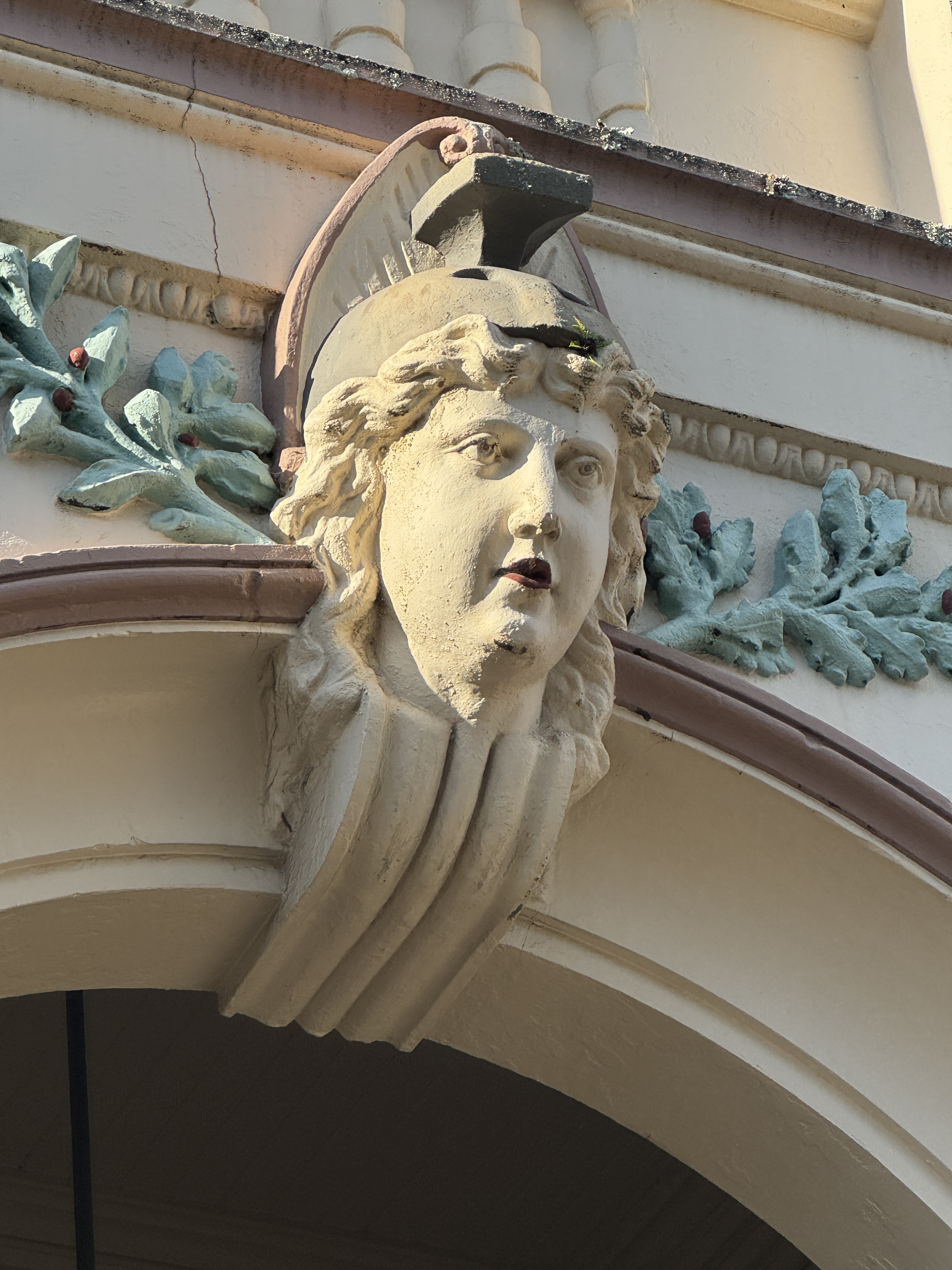
Above the entrance to the Maryborough School of Arts building there is this keystone with a plaster bust of Minerva.

The keystone of the moulding surrounding the central archway has a plaster moulded bust of Minerva, goddess of the city and protector of civilised life.

Internally the building is arranged around a large central hall, accessed from the principal entrance off Kent Street. Rooms are found off either side of the hall on the ground floor and the hall is terminated in the eastern corner of the building with the stair hall. The entrance is through an elaborate double timber door opening from the recessed porch.

== History ==
The Maryborough School of Arts was constructed in 1887–1888 to the design of Melbourne and Adelaide architect, John Grainger. The substantial two-storeyed rendered brick building replaced the first Maryborough School of Arts which was a small brick building constructed in 1861 soon after the establishment of a local School of Arts committee in 1860.

The original township of Maryborough was situated, not in its current place, but on the north of the Mary River, after wharves were established in 1847–1848 providing transport for wool from sheep stations on the Burnett River. In 1850 Surveyor, Hugh Roland Labatt arrived in Maryborough with instructions to "examine the River Mary...to suggest ...the best site or sites for the laying out of the town, having regard to the convenience of shipping on one hand and internal communication on the other...also...point out the spots desirable as reserves for public building, church, quay and for places for public recreation." The site recommended by Labatt was not where settlement was established but further east and from the early 1850s this is where the growing town developed.

By 1860 the local community had decided upon the erection of a School of Arts, where technical classes could be held for adults and provision made for a public library. Schools of Arts were established all over Queensland in the nineteenth century, with the Brisbane School of Arts being the first in 1849. The institutions were part of a nineteenth-century British movement encouraging widespread popular education, particularly in industrial areas. Mechanics Institutes and later Schools of Arts, co-operative societies, working men's colleges and the university extension movement were all formed to improve the education of working men and instruct them in various trades. This movement broadened to include all types of adult education, both technical and cultural. Applied or useful arts, rather than fine arts, formed the basis of the education provided at the Schools of Arts, as they became the forerunners to the technical education movement and in fact usually provided class rooms for what latter became technical colleges.

Four tenders were received by the School of Arts Committee on 10 October 1860 for the erection of a timber building and that of local contractor, W Holland for £430 was accepted. In January of the following year it was reported that the Queensland Government had granted a site to the Committee for the erection of their building, describes as Allotment 4 on Section 85 containing an area of two roods. The Queensland Government generally supported the establishment of Schools of Arts throughout Queensland and often provided some sort of subsidy, in the form of a loan for construction as well as a land grant for their construction. The land granted was in Kent Street where the current School of Arts building stands, opposite the early police and justice reserve.

The foundation stone was laid on 5 February 1861 by Gilbert Eliott, the newly elected member for Wide Bay in the Queensland Legislative Assembly. On 17 October 1861 the building was officially opened with the hope that it would "be the first of a number of links which would unite all classes for the common good, it was a place where all could meet without distinction." The building constructed was of brick with a steeply pitched gabled roof and ornamental bargeboard, symmetrically arranged with a central entrance and simple flat arched window openings.

Although Maryborough was proclaimed a municipality (the Borough of Maryborough) in October 1861 it was not until 1874 that the town acquired a Town Hall which was constructed beside the first School of Arts. In 1884 a Maryborough School of Arts Land Sale Act (1884) was passed to enable the trustees of the School of Arts to sell a portion of their grant to finance the construction of a new School of Arts. As early as 1885 sections of the allotment were sold with the largest section retained as the site of the new School of Arts.

Competitive designs were invited from architects for a substantial School of Arts in Maryborough and £50 prize money being offered. Thirty one entries were received and, at a meeting on 10 November 1886, that of John Grainger was awarded the first prize and the contract for the project. The prize winning entry was for a substantial two-storeyed rendered brick building, with a prominent classically inspired facade which was to cost no more than £3,000.

John Grainger was an architect of Adelaide and Melbourne who had opened an office in Brisbane after his partnership, Grainger and D'Ebro, won a design competition for the Brisbane Public Offices, later known as the Treasury Building. However, their design for the Brisbane building was overlooked in favour of John James Clark's. Grainger returned to Melbourne and his partnership with Charles D'Ebro ended before he entered the competition for the Maryborough School of Arts. After completion of that project he was appointed to the position of Chief Architect of the Western Australian Department of Public Works.

The contract for the construction of the School of Arts was let on 1 March 1887 to local contractors, Jacob and John Rooney (J&J Rooney) and the final construction cost was £3,500. The foundation stone for the building was laid on 3 June 1887 in an elaborate ceremony.

The building constructed was a substantial tw- storeyed rendered brick structure with a classically inspired facade reflecting the cultural and educational aspirations of the institution. Many public buildings constructed since the Renaissance employed elements of classical architecture to imbue the structure with a sense of tradition and authority. The principal facade of the Maryborough School of Arts employs classical proportion and symmetry as well as detailing like the round arched windows of the first floor, oculi openings above the ground floor windows, entablature surmounted by central triangular pediment flanked by acroteria, as well as a system of projecting pilasters and rustication encouraging a three dimensional quality. In a lengthy report on Maryborough in 1895, the Sydney Mail, described the School of Arts as the "lion of the town" to which "every visitor is duty bound to go over...and admire...with fervour."

The building was opened in a discreet ceremony on 21 May 1888 and a short report in the Maryborough Chronicle, described the building and services offered in the improved structure. The library, with over 5,000 volumes, was housed on the ground floor as well as two large class rooms separated by cedar folding doors. On the first floor was a reading room with a groined ceiling and, adjacent to this, a smoking room. Later in 1888 the School of Arts Committee received a grant of £500 from local benefactor, Janet Melville for the establishment of a museum in the new building. Glass cabinets were fixed in the foyer and reading room and an extensive collection was amassed including timber and mineral samples, works of art and examples of taxidermy.

After a grant of £2,500 was received from the Queensland Government for the establishment of technical classes in art and science in 1890, the Maryborough School of Arts commenced teaching classes. The popularity and success of these technical classes, which would in time lead to the establishment of the Maryborough Technical College, meant that a timber class room extension was added to the rear of the building in 1895. J & J Rooney's tender of £165/2/0 was accepted on 11 January and the extension was completed in June 1895.

In April 1896 a verandah and ground floor loggia was added to the eastern side of the School of Arts to the design of local contractor Charles Crystall from partnership, Crystall and Armstrong. The tender of another local contractor, Henry Neale, for £189/10/0 was accepted for the construction of the verandah and loggia and the cast iron balustrading was sourced from the local Albion Foundry. The spaces thus formed were provided as a shady retreat in the "trying summer months". A verandah was also erected on the rear of the timber classroom extension in 1900, although this section was again extended in 1903–1904 with the erection of another lecture hall. A Recreation Club was established in one of the rear timber buildings and this was furnished with billiard tables and assumed the role of the smoking room on the first floor of the main building which was converted into a reference library.

The next major alteration occurred in 1907 when Bundaberg architect, Frederic Herbert Faircloth was commissioned to design a gallery in the library of the School of Arts. Faircloth had previously designed a similar gallery for the School of Arts in Bundaberg. Tenders were called on 21 August 1907 and the lowest tender from T. McLeod of £94 was accepted. The final cost of the gallery was £134/1/1 and the timber structure provided a balustraded internal balcony on three sides of the library and was accessed by a narrow timber stair from the ground floor. This addition allowed the book shelving to be extended to the ceiling.

The Maryborough Technical College, although still housed in the School of Arts, became a separately managed association with its own committee in 1910. When the Maryborough City Hall was erected opposite the School of Arts, the former town hall site was purchased for the erection of technical college buildings. By 1936 the Technical College had expanded and was removed from the School of Arts to the newly established Maryborough State High School, at the former Grammar School grounds.

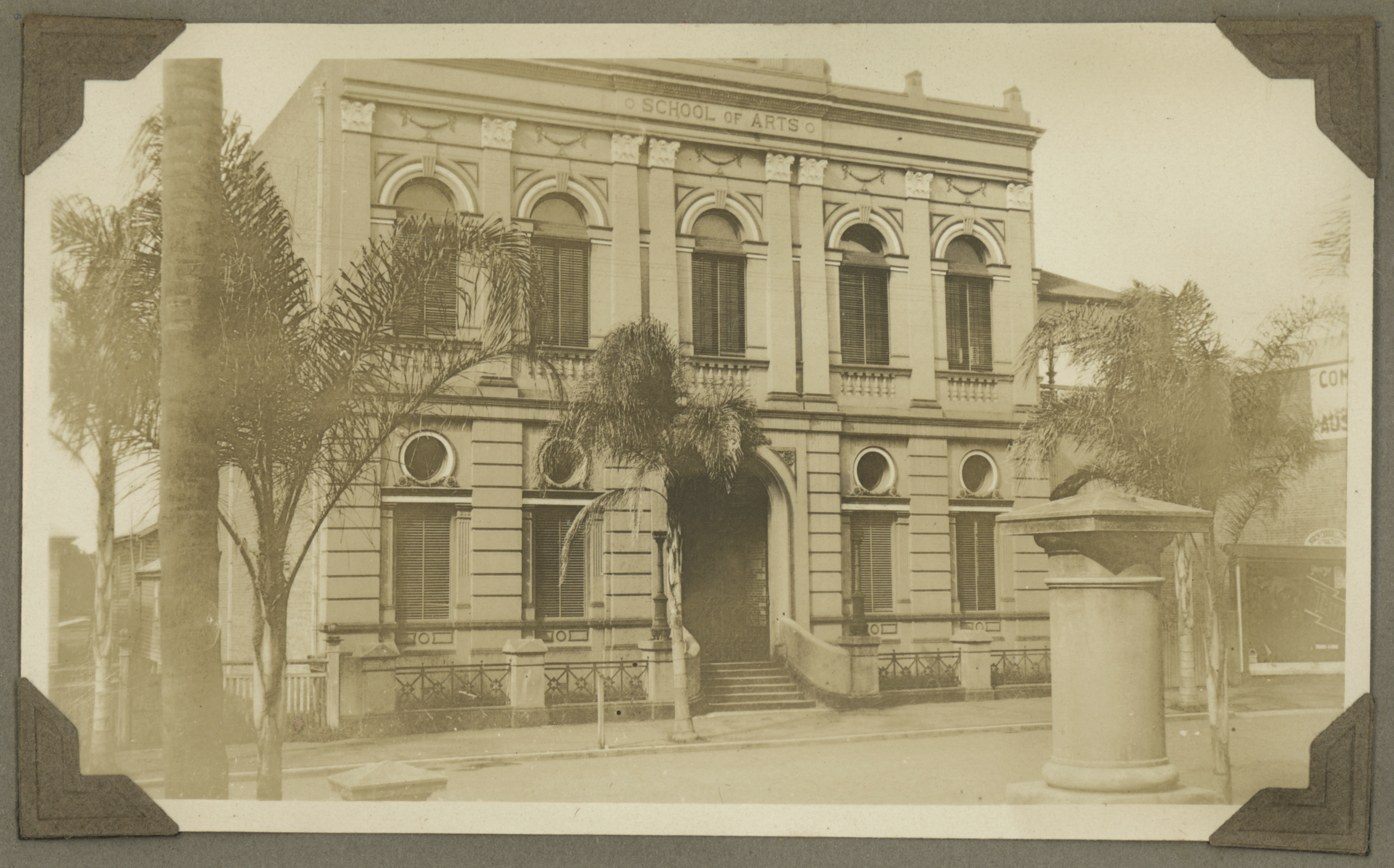
Maryborough School of Arts, 1930

From the 1920s government subsidies to the School of Arts were reduced, in favour of the technical colleges and this further reduced their role in the community. Renovation projects were undertaken at the School of Arts from the 1910s and the building became used as offices for various local community bodies, including the Country Women's Association and the Grammarians Recreation Club. During the World War II the School of Arts was resumed by the Government for use by the Australian Comforts Fund when extra bathroom facilities were added. A servicemen's club for members of the RAAF stationed in Maryborough was established in the building.

Although the library continued operating on the ground floor, the first floor of the School of Arts was maintained as tenancies for various bodies after the World War II. In 1949 the Australian Broadcasting Company (ABC) and the Engineering Section of the Post Master General's Department (PMG) moved into the first floor. Plans for offices and a broadcasting studio for the ABC were prepared by Brisbane architects, Hennessy & Hennessy, and the local ABC radio was established in the building. At this time the eastern verandah was enclosed to house offices of the PMG's Department.

In 1943 the Libraries Act was passed which sought to make better provision for the establishment and management of public libraries. The Act empowered local authorities to establish libraries, and also to assume management of the libraries currently operated by Schools of Arts. However, it was not until 1972 that the Maryborough City Council and the School of Arts Committee drew up an agreement which meant resulted in the Council accepting trusteeship of the School of Arts land and buildings, and for the council to be responsible for any financial deficiencies of the Committee. The School of Arts Committee agreed to operate the library until a Municipal Library was established. The Maryborough Public Library was opened in May 1977 and this meant the closure of the library at the School of Arts. Following this the Maryborough Wide Bay and Burnett Historical Society remained in the building as tenants and were given a forty-year lease.

== Description ==
The Maryborough School of Arts is a substantial two storeyed masonry building, prominently located on Kent Street adjacent to the new City Council Chambers and opposite the 1906 Town Hall. The site contains the building constructed to the line of the footpath with a two storeyed timber framed verandah to the south east covering a driveway to an open space at the rear. The School of Arts is a smooth rendered brick building with a hipped roof.

The principal, south western facade of the School of Arts, which addresses Kent Street, is symmetrically arranged and employs classical proportion and detailing. The facade is divided into five bays divided by rusticated pilasters at the ground floor level and by single and double engaged columns with Corinthian capitals on the first floor. The central bay features a recessed arched entrance porch to which access is provided via two concrete steps from ground level. The keystone of the moulding surrounding the archway has a plaster moulded bust of Minerva, goddess of the city and protector of civilised life. From behind her head foliage, of two different types, emerges. Flanking the entrance, in the recesses formed by the rusticated pilasters, are two square arched openings surmounted by oculi with decorative mouldings joining the two windows. At first floor level are five, equally sized, round arched openings, in the recesses of the attached columns, with sills resting on blank balustraded panels. Mouldings surround the arched heads of these windows, and moulded swags are found on recessed panels above the windows. The engaged columns support an entablature which acts as a parapet, with a central projecting panel featuring the words, "SCHOOL OF ARTS". Above the signage panel is a triangular pediment supported on a rectangular panel divided by squat engaged columns aligned with those on the levels below.

The north western facade of the building is attached to the adjacent City Council Chambers and a recent thoroughfare on the first floor of the School of Arts provides access to its neighbouring building. The south eastern elevation of the School of Arts is concealed by a double storeyed verandah covering a driveway on that side of the building. The verandah is supported, at ground level on a series of cast iron columns on masonry plinths, and has a deep scalloped timber frieze below first floor level. The first floor of the verandah structure is infilled with fibrous cement sheeting and glazing. The face of this side of the building continues the openings found on the principal facade for two bays. The rear of the School of Arts is unrendered brickwork, of two types of brick reflecting the growth of the building. There are only four small square openings at first floor level on this elevation.

Internally the building is arranged around a large central hall, accessed from the principal entrance off Kent Street. Rooms are found off either side of the hall on the ground floor and the hall is terminated in the eastern corner of the building with the stair hall. The entrance is through an elaborate double timber door opening from the recessed porch. The doors are half glazed and panelled, surmounted by a triangular pedimented entablature and all surrounded by clear glazed sidelights and semicircular fanlight. Generally the interior has timber boarded floors, plastered walls and timber boarded ceilings. On the first floor level of the building the ceilings are of timber boards which rake downwards to meet original walls. The dog legged timber stair is cantilevered above the midway landing and has turned timber balusters and substantial turned and carved timber newels. Providing natural lighting to the stairwell is a large round arched opening on the south eastern wall of the building.

On the ground level of the School of Arts, through a door on the north west side of the central hall is the early library of the building, now used by a local historical society. This large room, extending almost the full length of the building, has a timber gallery, which seems to be suspended with iron rods from roof beams, to which access is provided via a steep and narrow stair. The gallery is lined with a simple cast iron balustrade, comprising decorative iron newels joined by an iron rail, and a base skirting board of timber with trefoiled cutouts. The library is filled with early books and bookshelves, early museum display cabinets and other early items of importance to the understanding of the history of the building. Elsewhere on the ground and upper floor are smaller rooms with extant timber joinery and other fittings.

== Heritage listing ==
School of Arts was listed on the Queensland Heritage Register on 21 October 1992 having satisfied the following criteria.

The place is important in demonstrating the evolution or pattern of Queensland's history.

The Maryborough School of Arts building demonstrates the development of adult education in Queensland from the nineteenth-century movement concerned with providing popular education by local communities to twentieth century-state education programmes.

The place is important in demonstrating the principal characteristics of a particular class of cultural places.

The building is characteristic of a large regional School of Arts, constructed in a classical style, and housing a reading room, library and class rooms. Though a standard feature of most Queensland towns of the nineteenth century, Schools of Art have been replaced by other education facilities and municipal libraries, and therefore a once prominent and integral feature of the town fabric, the civic role of the Maryborough School of Arts has been altered dramatically.

The place is important because of its aesthetic significance.

The building is an important element of the Kent Street streetscape, with a prominent, well composed facade. The building features fine joinery, well crafted plasterwork and well proportioned internal spaces.

The place has a strong or special association with a particular community or cultural group for social, cultural or spiritual reasons.

The building, a public facility for over one hundred years and the forerunner to the current municipal library and technical college, has special importance to the local community.

The place has a special association with the life or work of a particular person, group or organisation of importance in Queensland's history.

The building, a public facility for over one hundred years and the forerunner to the current municipal library and technical college, has special importance to the local community.
