= William John Miles =

Australian businessman and activist

William Miles
- Born: 27 August 1871; Woolloomooloo, New South Wales, Australia
- Died: 10 January 1942 (aged 70); Gordon, New South Wales, Australia
- Education: Newington College
- Spouse: Maria Binnington (m. 1897)
- Relatives: Bea Miles (daughter)

William John Miles (27 August 1871 – 10 January 1942) was an Australian businessman and far-right political activist.

== Early life ==
Miles was born on 27 August 1871 in Woolloomooloo, New South Wales. He was the son of Ellen (née Munton) and John Balfour Clement Miles. His mother, born in England, was the widow of musician William J. Cordner. His father, born in Tahiti, was a public accountant.

Miles was raised in the Sydney suburb of Ashfield. His parents were wealthy and he went on an extended tour of Europe with them in 1882 and 1883 visiting Britain, Germany, Austria and Hungary. On his return to Australia he attended Newington College from 1883 until 1886 during the headship of William Henry Williams. As a young man he was a member of the Sydney Philharmonic Society and sang at St Mary's Cathedral.

== Business career ==
Miles followed his father into the accounting profession, joining the firm of Miles, Vane & Miles (later Yarwood, Vane & Miles). He became a fellow of the Australasian Corporation of Public Accountants and was a long-serving director of Peapes, a menswear store on George Street, Sydney, of which he became the majority shareholder. He retired from business in 1935 on an annual income estimated at £6,000 (equivalent to $700,000 in 2022).

In 1913, Miles unsuccessfully sued the Sydney Meat-Preserving Company, of which he was a major shareholder, for its failure to pay dividends. The High Court of Australia ruled against him by 2–1 in the case of Miles v Sydney Meat-Preserving Co Ltd.

== Activism ==
Miles was a secularist. In about 1912 he founded a local branch of England's Rationalist Press Association, which subsequently became the Rationalist Association of New South Wales. In the same year he published a pamphlet titled The Myth of the Resurrection of Jesus, the Christ. However, he resigned from the Rationalist Association in 1920 after a quarrel with other members.

During World War I, Miles was active in the movement against conscription and gave speeches in The Domain. In private correspondence he repeatedly expressed hopes for a German victory, apparently on the grounds that this would encourage Australia's independence from Britain. In 1916, Miles began writing for Robert Samuel Ross's Magazine of Protest, Personality and Progress. Around the same time he made attempts to form an Australia-First Committee and an Advance Australia League.

In 1917, Miles became honorary secretary of the No Imperial Federation League of New South Wales, an organisation formed by Australian Labor Party figures Oscar Zieman and Jack Power to oppose Australia joining an Imperial Federation with Britain and the other Dominions. He continued to express anti-British sentiments and wrote a number of articles for The International Socialist and The Australian Worker in which he put forward "a strident form of Australian nationalism, conceived in Manichean terms and articulated in vituperative prose".

In 1936, Miles established The Publicist, "a pro-monarchical, pro-fascist, pro-Aboriginal, anti-British, anti-communist and anti-Semitic monthly" with himself as editor. He developed a close relationship with writer P. R. Stephensen, whom he employed as a "literary adviser". He shared Stephensen's nationalist views and published his work The Foundations of Culture in Australia in 1936, which became influential among the Jindyworobak Movement. Miles also published Xavier Herbert's debut novel Capricornia in 1938. He also financed the Aborigines Progressive Association and its related publication The Australian Abo Call.

== Personal life ==
In 1897, Miles married Maria Louisa Binnington, the daughter of a Queensland fishmonger. The couple had two sons and four daughters. He had a tempestuous relationship with his daughter Beatrice, at one point forcing her into the Gladesville Hospital for the Insane.

Miles died on 10 January 1942 at the age of 70.
