= Fraser Coast Chronicle =

Online newspaper serving the Fraser Coast area in Queensland, Australia

- Type: Newspaper
- Format: Tabloid (prior to ceasing printed publication
- Owner: News Corp Australia
- Editor: Jessica Grewal
- Founded: 1860
- Language: English
- Circulation: 9,550 Monday-Friday; 11,095 Saturday (prior to ceasing printed publication)
- Price: A$1.00 Monday–Friday; A$1.20 Saturday
- Website: frasercoastchronicle.com.au

The Fraser Coast Chronicle is an online newspaper serving the Fraser Coast area in Queensland, Australia. It was started as the Maryborough Chronicle, Wide Bay and Burnett Advertiser.

== History ==
Charles Hardie Buzacott first published the Maryborough Chronicle, Wide Bay and Burnett Advertiser in Maryborough as a four-page tabloid, in his slab hut in Lennox Street in November 1860. It sold for sixpence and was read from Gayndah in the west and Childers in the north to Gympie in the south.

In 1863, Buzacott sold his interests to William Swain Roberts and Joseph Robinson, who set out to "reflect the community's wants and opinions while boldly and distinctly enunciating our own views". As the rough river town turned into a respectable city, its newspaper became a bi-weekly in 1864, a tri-weekly in 1868 and a daily in 1882.

In 1867, Roberts became sole proprietor and managing editor. A Scot, Andrew Dunn from Toowoomba, joined the Chronicle in 1885, beginning a long association with the Dunn family. Through war, flood and fire the presses rolled, although, as one edition reports, it was touch and go in the 1893 Brisbane flood: "We must confess that at this hour (3 a.m.) as we are going to press the state of the flood and events just reported completely upset our anticipation of comparative safety."

Circulation growth brought the price down to twopence in 1901 and a penny in 1903.

From 25 April 1947, the title was simplified to Maryborough Chronicle.

After several shifts, Bazaar Street became the Chronicle's new home in 1957. A satellite office operated in Hervey Bay. In 1966 the paper's format changed from broadsheet to tabloid and in 1977 it moved to offset printing.

In 2005, the Chronicle shifted its headquarters From Maryborough to a new Hervey Bay office. In 2020, with the cessation of the print edition, this office was closed.

Along with many other regional Australian newspapers owned by NewsCorp, the newspaper ceased print editions in June 2020 and became an online-only publication.

== Current status ==
The Fraser Coast Chronicle website is part of the News Corp Australia's News Regional Media network.

== Digitisation ==
The Maryborough Chronicle has been digitised as part of the Australian Newspapers Digitisation Program of the National Library of Australia for the years 1860 to 1954.

== See also ==
- List of newspapers in Australia
