= Deaths in April 2025 =

The following is a list of notable deaths in April 2025.

Entries for each day are listed alphabetically by surname. A typical entry lists information in the following sequence:

- Name, age, country of citizenship at birth, subsequent country of citizenship (if applicable), reason for notability, cause of death (if known), and reference.

== April 2025 ==
=== 1 ===
- Miguel Ángel Aguilar Miranda, 85, Ecuadorian Roman Catholic prelate, bishop of Guaranda (1991–2004) and Military Ordinariate of Ecuador (2004–2014).
- Deepak Bohara, 74, Nepalese politician, MP (since 2022).
- Arsenio Campos, 79, Mexican actor.
- Leandro Domingues, 41, Brazilian footballer (Vitória, Kashiwa Reysol, Yokohama FC), testicular cancer.
- George Freeman, 97, American jazz guitarist (Birth Sign, New Improved Funk, Man & Woman).
- Wayne Handy, 89, American rock and roll singer.
- He Zhukang, 93, Chinese politician, deputy (1983–1998), governor of Henan (1983–1987) and Jilin (1987–1989).
- Michael Hurley, 83, American folk singer-songwriter (Have Moicy!, Snockgrass, Watertower).
- Stanley O. Ikenberry, 90, American academic, president of the University of Illinois System (1979–1995, 2010).
- Charles H. Jacoby Jr., 70, American general.
- Alfi Kabiljo, 89, Croatian composer and musician.
- Dean T. Kashiwagi, 72, American economist.
- Val Kilmer, 65, American actor (Top Gun, The Doors, Batman Forever), pneumonia.
- Gerald Luss, 98, American architect (Gerald Luss House).
- Sergey Mavrin, 73, Russian jurist, judge (since 2005) and deputy president (since 2009) of the Constitutional Court.
- Luc Michel, 67, Belgian political activist.
- Yahyah Michot, 72, Belgian Islamologist and academic.
- William Moylan, 93, American electrical engineer.
- Nancy Huddleston Packer, 99, American writer.
- María del Carmen Pinete Vargas, 64, Mexican politician, four-term deputy, vice president of the Chamber (2024).
- Alfred Recours, 80, French politician, mayor of Conches-en-Ouche (1984–2020) and deputy (1988–1993, 1997–2002).
- Dave Täht, 59, American network engineer.
- Johnny Tillotson, 86, American singer-songwriter ("Poetry in Motion", "It Keeps Right On a-Hurtin'", "Without You"), complications from Parkinson's disease.
- John Vella, 74, American football player (Oakland Raiders, Minnesota Vikings), Super Bowl champion (1977).
- Clare Westcott, 100, Canadian political consultant and police commissioner.
- Roger J-B Wets, 88, Belgian mathematician.
- Faramarz Zelli, 82, Iranian footballer (Kian Tehran, PAS Tehran, national team).

=== 2 ===
- Omar Aktouf, 80, Algerian-born Canadian consultant and academic.
- Judith Billings, 81, American judge, judge of the Utah Court of Appeals (1987–2008).
- Gregor Formanek, 100, Romanian German Nazi soldier.
- Priscilla Frisch, 81, American astronomer.
- Teresa González Murillo, 52–53, Mexican human rights activist, shot.
- William D. Graves, 87, American politician, member of the Oklahoma House of Representatives (1978–2004).
- Matt Hassett, 93, Irish hurler (Toomevara, Tipperary).
- Bob Holladay, 93, American football player (San Francisco 49ers, Los Angeles Rams).
- Johnny King, 92, English footballer (Crewe Alexandra, Stoke City, Cardiff City).
- Petra Krause, 86, German-Italian communist militant and weapons smuggler.
- Carl M. Kuttler Jr., 85, American academic administrator, president of St. Petersburg College (1978–2009).
- Winifred W. Logan, 98, British nurse theorist.
- Fábio Marcelino, 52, Brazilian Olympic volleyball player (1996).
- Don Mattson, 69, Australian footballer (Richmond).
- M. Hasna Maznavi, 39, American writer, director and activist, founder of the Women's Mosque of America, complications from diabetes.
- Austin Metcalf, 17, American teenager, stabbed.
- Don Moon, 89, American academic administrator, president of Shimer College (1978–2004).
- Peter Pearson, 87, Canadian film director (The Best Damn Fiddler from Calabogie to Kaladar, Paperback Hero) and screenwriter.
- Zdravko Pečar, 75, Slovenian Olympic discus thrower (1972).
- Suzanne Rand, 75, American actress and comedian, cardiopulmonary arrest.
- Curtis R. Reitz, 95, American legal scholar.
- Roy Sinclair, 96, Scottish Hall of Fame curler, president of the World Curling Federation (2000–2006).
- Khamtai Siphandone, 101, Laotian politician, president (1998–2006), prime minister (1991–1998), and chairman of the Revolutionary Party (1992–2006).
- Franklin Stahl, 95, American molecular biologist (Meselson–Stahl experiment), heart failure.
- Alois Švehlík, 85, Czech actor (Forbidden Dreams, Alois Nebel, On the Roof) and theater pedagogue.
- Greg Zito, 72, American politician, member of the Illinois Senate (1983–1991) and House of Representatives (1981–1983).

=== 3 ===
- Andreas Prinz von Sachsen-Coburg und Gotha, 82, German landowner, head of the House of Saxe-Coburg and Gotha (since 1998).
- Alfredo Bianchini, 84, Italian politician, deputy (1992–1994).
- Knut Brofoss, 76, Norwegian civil servant, director of the National Insurance Court (2005–2016).
- Wanda Chase, 74, Brazilian journalist and Black activist.
- Floyd Clack, 84, American politician, member of the Michigan House of Representatives (1983–1996).
- Jenni L. Evans, 63, Australian-born American meteorologist and academic.
- Anthony V. Gazzara, 87, American lawyer and politician, member of the New York State Assembly (1974–1976) and senate (1976–1983).
- Eunice Golden, 98, American painter.
- Farooq Hamid, 80, Pakistani cricketer (Lahore, PIA, national team).
- Stephen Mo Hanan, 78, American actor (Cats), heart attack.
- Wilfried Hilker, 94, German football referee.
- Ted Hipkiss, 78, New Zealand cricketer (Northern Districts).
- Ivan Kley, 66, Brazilian tennis player and coach.
- Daniel Kluger, 73, Israeli writer.
- Jiří Kochta, 78, Czech ice hockey player (Jihlava, Sparta Praha), Olympic silver medallist (1968).
- Jesse Kornbluth, 79, American journalist and author, Lewy body dementia.
- Theodore McCarrick, 94, American laicized Roman Catholic cardinal, archbishop of Newark (1986–2000) and Washington (2001–2006).
- Paulo Mendo, 92, Portuguese doctor and politician, minister of health (1993–1995), MP (1995–1999).
- Mirawas, 69–70, Pakistani comedian.
- Frank Moberg, 85, Finnish ice hockey executive (HIFK).
- Mick O'Dwyer, 88, Irish Gaelic football player (Waterville, South Kerry) and manager (Kerry).
- Ladislas Orsy, 103, Hungarian theologian.
- Seyit Halil Özsoy, 76–77, Turkish politician, MP (1987–1991).
- David Paton, 94, American ophthalmologist, co-founder of Orbis International.
- Amphon Phongsuwan, 60, Thai civil servant. (death announced on this date)
- Juan Andrés Ramírez, 77, Uruguayan politician, minister of the interior (1990–1993), cancer.
- John Saint Ryan, 72, English actor (Coronation Street, Roar, Squanto: A Warrior's Tale) and equestrian, heart attack.
- Amália Sterbinszky, 74, Hungarian handball player, Olympic bronze medallist (1976).
- Idris Abdul'aziz Dutsen Tanshi, 67–68, Nigerian imam.
- Dean Wells, 54, American football player (Seattle Seahawks, Carolina Panthers, New England Patriots), acute lymphoblastic leukemia.
- Andy Wharton, 63, English footballer (Burnley, Torquay United, Chester City).
- Martin Windrow, 80–81, British historian.
- Margarita Xhepa, 93, Albanian actress (People's Artist of Albania).

=== 4 ===
- Amadou Bagayoko, 70, Malian musician (Amadou & Mariam).
- Marion Blackburn, 86, American tennis player and entrepreneur.
- Jim Brandenburg, 79, American environmentalist and wildlife photographer.
- Vicki Brick, 43, American basketball player (Sydney Flames), ovarian cancer.
- Perri Cutten, 73, Australian fashion designer.
- Barbara Everett, 92, British academic.
- Paul Fierlinger, 89, Czech-American animator and director (My Dog Tulip).
- John A. Galloway, 96, American endocrinologist.
- Ron Gardin, 80, American football player (Baltimore Colts, New England Patriots), Super Bowl champion (1971).
- Petro Georgiou, 77, Greek-born Australian politician, MP (1994–2010).
- Ataullah Hafezzi, 77, Bangladeshi Islamist leader and politician.
- Aanund Hylland, 75, Norwegian economist.
- Paul Karo, 89, Scottish-born Australian actor (Quiet Night, The Box, Prisoner).
- Manoj Kumar, 87, Indian actor (Kranti, Upkar, Roti Kapada Aur Makaan).
- Larisa Maksimova, 81, Russian mathematician.
- Edgar Yves Monnou, 72, Beninese politician, minister of foreign affairs (1995–1996).
- Friðrik Ólafsson, 90, Icelandic chess grandmaster, president of FIDE (1978–1982).
- Kate Orchard, 102, British World War II veteran (Women's Auxiliary Corps).
- Eraslan Özkaya, 85, Turkish judge, president of the Court of Cassation (2002–2004).
- Ravikumar, 71, Indian actor (Ullasa Yaathra, Aanandham Paramaanandham, Ee Manohara Theeram), lung cancer.
- Bernard Ringeissen, 90, French classical pianist.
- Tony Rundle, 86, Australian politician, premier of Tasmania (1996–1998).
- Frank Rusagara, 69–70, Rwandan political prisoner. (death announced on this date)
- Ray Seals, 59, American football player (Pittsburgh Steelers).
- Paul Strassmann, 96, Czech-born American information technology executive.
- Peter Turang, 78, Indonesian Roman Catholic prelate, archbishop of Kupang (1997–2024).
- Gene Ward, 82, American politician, member of the Hawaii House of Representatives (1990–1998, 2006–2025).
- Chris Youlden, 82, English blues rock singer (Savoy Brown), bronchial pneumonia.
- Kazuyuki Yukawa, 75, Japanese politician, MP (2012–2014), aspiration pneumonia.
- Connie Zehr, 87, American installation artist.

=== 5 ===
- Dave Allen, 69, English bassist (Gang of Four, Shriekback) and record label executive (World Domination Recordings).
- Mouhcine Bouhlal, 54, Moroccan footballer (FAR Rabat, national team, 1992 Olympics).
- Corrin Brooks-Meade, 37, English-born Montserratian footballer (Alki Larnaca, Nea Salamis, Montserrat national team).
- Cedric Dempsey, 92, American sports administrator, executive director of the NCAA (1994–2003).
- Antonello Fassari, 72, Italian actor (Romanzo Criminale, The Goodbye Kiss, Suburra) and comedian.
- Colin Fox, 86, Canadian actor (Psi Factor, Atomic Betty, Tommy Boy).
- Nasiru Sulemana Gbadegbe, 74, Ghanaian jurist, justice of the Supreme Court (2009–2020).
- Georg Gölter, 86, German politician, MP (1969–1977), member of the Landtag of Rhineland-Palatinate (1979–2006).
- Heikki Hasu, 99, Finnish Nordic skier, Olympic champion (1948, 1952), and politician, MP (1962–1970).
- Shigeaki Hattori, 61, Japanese racing driver (Indy Racing League, NASCAR Craftsman Truck Series) and team owner (Hattori Racing Enterprises), traffic collision.
- Raymond Hawthorne, 88, New Zealand stage actor and theatre director (National Opera of New Zealand).
- Thomas W. Hoover, 92, American politician, member of the New Mexico House of Representatives (1964–1974).
- Harry Humes, 89, American poet.
- Julian Jacobs, 87, American judge.
- Philip W. Johnston, 80, American politician, member of the Massachusetts House of Representatives (1975–1979) and Senate (1979–1989), stroke.
- Nesta Wyn Jones, 78, Welsh poet and writer.
- Richard Kahn, 95, American marketing executive.
- Di McCarthy, New Zealand neuroscientist and science administrator, chief executive of the Royal Society of New Zealand (2007–2014).
- Bob McManus, 81, American newspaper editor (New York Post).
- Lu Long Ogburn Medlin, 92, American beauty queen.
- Luigi Nocera, 70, Italian politician, deputy (1994–2001).
- Nate Oliver, 84, American baseball player (Los Angeles Dodgers, Chicago Cubs, New York Yankees).
- Pasha Technique, 40, Russian rapper and music producer, complications from drug overdose.
- Hans-Peter Repnik, 77, German politician, MP (1983–2005).
- Enrique Sánchez de León, 90, Spanish politician, minister of health and social security (1977–1979).
- David A. Siegel, 89, American hotelier, founder of Westgate Resorts.
- Harmen Siezen, 84, Dutch newsreader (NOS Journaal) and journalist.
- Billy Smith, 70, American baseball player (Houston Astros).
- Peter Stuhlmacher, 93, German Protestant theologian and biblical scholar.
- Philip Sunshine, 94, American neonatologist.
- Birger Vestermo, 95, Norwegian Olympic cross-country skier (1956).
- Carl Warwick, 88, American baseball player (St. Louis Cardinals, Houston Colt .45s, Baltimore Orioles), World Series champion (1964).
- Derek Whitehead, 81, English rugby league footballer (Warrington, Lancashire, national team).
- Avigdor Yitzhaki, 75, Israeli politician, MK (2006–2008).

=== 6 ===
- Ronald Appleton, 97, Northern Irish prosecutor.
- Ken Beck, 84, Australian footballer (Hawthorn).
- Jorge Bolaño, 47, Colombian footballer (Atlético Junior, Parma, national team), heart attack.
- Clem Burke, 70, American Hall of Fame drummer (Blondie), cancer.
- Robert Corbett, 86, Canadian politician, MP (1978–1993).
- Roberto De Simone, 91, Italian stage director and composer (La Gatta Cenerentola).
- Adel Dridi, Tunisian businessman and convicted criminal.
- Peter Geiger, 82, Liechtensteiner historian.
- Joseph Grodin, 94, American lawyer and jurist, associate justice of the California Supreme Court (1982–1987).
- Kosala Jayaweera, 38, Sri Lankan politician, MP (since 2024), heart attack.
- Momodou Lamin Sedat Jobe, 80, Gambian politician, minister of foreign affairs (1998–2001).
- Brian Jones, 89, Welsh rugby union player (Newport RFC, national team).
- Percy Knight, 70, Australian rugby footballer (Balmain Tigers, Canberra Raiders, New South Wales).
- Max Kozloff, 91, American art historian, art critic and photographer.
- Lee Ek Tieng, 91, Singaporean bureaucrat.
- Peter McEvoy, 72, British golfer.
- Avis McIntosh, 86, New Zealand Olympic hurdler and sprinter (1964).
- John Mills, 86, British businessman, founder of JML.
- Dan Murray, 90, Irish Gaelic footballer (Macroom GAA, UCC GAA, Cork).
- Jay North, 73, American actor (Dennis the Menace, Maya, Arabian Knights), colorectal cancer.
- Victor Omololu Olunloyo, 89, Nigerian mathematician and politician, governor of Oyo State (1983).
- Jeremiah P. Ostriker, 87, American astrophysicist, renal disease.
- Rémy Pautrat, 85, French civil servant, director of the Direction de la surveillance du territoire (1985–1986).
- Claude Saurel, 76, French rugby union player (Béziers) and manager (Morocco national team, Russia national team).
- Anna Slováčková, 29, Czech singer (Tvoje tvář má známý hlas) and actress (Ordinace v růžové zahradě 2), breast cancer.
- Ollie Taylor, 78, American basketball player (ABA).
- Paschal Topno, 92, Indian Roman Catholic prelate, bishop of Ambikapur (1985–1994) and archbishop of Bhopal (1994–2007).
- Albert Vanucci, 77, French footballer (Sochaux, Monaco, national team).
- Willie Vassallo, 75, Maltese footballer (Floriana, Green Gully, national team).
- Cecilia Villalobos, 63, Chilean politician and academic, governor of Colchagua Province (2004–2006).
- Marlene Warfield, 83, American actress (Network, Maude, The Great White Hope), lung cancer.
- Chaudhry Arshad Javaid Warraich, 68, Pakistani politician, Punjab MPA (2013–2023).
- Pongsri Woranuch, 85, Thai luk thung singer, lung disease.
- Sam Pee Yalley, Ghanaian lawyer and government official.
- Barbara Yeaman, 100, American conservationist.
- Sami Zubaida, 88, Iraqi scholar.

=== 7 ===
- Kenny Adams, 84, American Hall of Fame boxing trainer.
- Sir Christopher Airy, 91, British army officer and courtier, Major-General commanding the Household Division (1986–1989) and private secretary to the Prince of Wales (1990–1991).
- Evelyn Bacon, 75, Canadian politician, Saskatchewan MLA (1982–1986).
- Keith Bakker, 64, American-Dutch mental health practitioner and convicted criminal, heart failure.
- Edward Belfort, 59, Surinamese politician, minister of justice and police (2012–2015), MP (since 2015).
- Mike Bradwell, 76, British theatre director and playwright.
- Paul Breza, 87, American Roman Catholic priest and Kashubian American activist.
- Marcel Cupák, 51, Czech footballer (SK Sigma Olomouc, 1. FK Drnovice, Zbrojovka Brno).
- Andy Dindar, 82, South African-born English cricketer (Gloucestershire, Hertfordshire, Berkshire).
- Alex Faulkner, 88, Canadian ice hockey player (Toronto Maple Leafs, Detroit Red Wings).
- Elsa Honig Fine, 94, American art historian.
- William Finn, 73, American composer (Falsettos, A New Brain, The 25th Annual Putnam County Spelling Bee), Tony Award winner (1992), pulmonary fibrosis.
- John Haiman, 79, American linguist.
- Hinewhare Harawira, 71, New Zealand Māori activist, cancer.
- Raghbir Lal, 95, Indian field hockey player, Olympic champion (1952, 1956).
- Marvin Levy, 96, American film publicist (DreamWorks Pictures, Amblin Entertainment, Columbia Pictures).
- Roland Mall, 73, German footballer (VfB Stuttgart, Preußen Münster, Viktoria Köln).
- Greg Millen, 67, Canadian ice hockey player (St. Louis Blues, Hartford Whalers) and sportscaster (Hockey Night in Canada), heart attack.
- Murdaya Poo, 84, Indonesian businessman and politician, member of the House of Representatives (2004–2009), cancer.
- Kishna Ram Nai, 90, Indian politician, Rajasthan MLA (1990–1998, 2013–2018), kidney disease.
- Edith Nawakwi, 65, Zambian economist and politician, minister of finance (1998–1999).
- Colman O'Donovan, 97, Irish hurler (Midleton, Donoughmore, Cork) and Roman Catholic priest.
- Laura Pantelakos, 89, American politician, member of the New Hampshire House of Representatives (1978–2022).
- Jüri Põld, 68, Estonian judge, justice of the supreme court (1993–2021).
- David Renneberg, 82, Australian cricketer (national team).
- Bernard Rosenthal, 91, American scholar and historian.
- Dan Sullivan, 85, American football player (Baltimore Colts).
- Kathleen Thomerson, 91, American organist.
- Joey D. Vieira, 80, American actor (Lassie, The Patriot, Ferris Bueller's Day Off).
- Dimitris Vounatsos, 81–82, Greek lawyer and politician, MP (1981–1990, 1991–1996).
- Drew Zingg, 68, American guitarist.

=== 8 ===
- Richard Appignanesi, 84, Canadian writer.
- Cathy Bernheim, 78, French novelist and journalist.
- Teresina Bodkin, Montserratian civil servant, speaker of the Legislative Council (2010–2014, 2019–2020). (death announced on this date)
- Jacqueline Brisepierre, 79, French Olympic gymnast (1964, 1968).
- Herman E. Brockman, 91, American geneticist.
- Wilhelm Burgsmüller, 93, German footballer (Borussia Dortmund).
- Pascal Dozie, 85, Nigerian businessman and banker, founder of Diamond Bank.
- Carl-Göran Ekerwald, 101, Swedish novelist and literary critic.
- Amara Essy, 80, Ivorian diplomat and politician, president of the UNGA (1994–1995), acting secretary-general of the Organization of African Unity (2001–2002) and minister of foreign affairs (1990–2000).
- Ray Fisher, 91, American football player (Pittsburgh Steelers, Dallas Cowboys).
- Enzo Flego, 84, Italian politician, deputy (1992–1996).
- Svetlana Gerasimenko, 80, Tajikistani astronomer.
- Taj Haider, 83, Pakistani politician, playwright, and mathematician, senator (1995–2000), cancer.
- Vahdettin İşsever, 56, Turkish Olympic boxer (1996).
- Nicky Katt, 54, American actor (Dazed and Confused, Boston Public, Boiler Room), suicide by hanging.
- John Koech, 78–79, Kenyan politician, MP (1979–1990, 2003–2007).
- Manga, 87, Brazilian footballer (Sport Recife, Botafogo, national team), cancer.
- Sutton Marks, 96, American politician, member of the Mississippi House of Representatives (1960–1968).
- Faleh Al-Nasser, Jordanian politician, minister of health (2001–2002).
- Pere Palau Torres, 78, Spanish politician, member of the Parliament of the Balearic Islands (1987–2015), traffic collision.
- Ram Sahay Panday, 92, Indian Rai folk dancer.
- Dominique Pasquier, French sociologist.
- Aurélio Pereira, 77, Portuguese football coach and youth player scout.
- Elspeth Probyn, 67, Australian academic.
- Manfred Schüler, 93, German economist and politician.
- Pjotr Sunin, 66, Russian ski jumper.
- Teresa del Valle, 88, Spanish anthropologist.
- Dieter Versen, 79, German footballer (VfL Bochum, San Jose Earthquakes).
- Lenny Welch, 86, American pop singer.
- Keith Windschuttle, 82–83, Australian historian.
- Notable Dominicans killed in the Jet Set nightclub roof collapse:
  - Tony Blanco, 44, baseball player (Chunichi Dragons, Yokohama DeNA BayStars, Orix Buffaloes)
  - Nelsy Cruz, 42, politician, governor of Monte Cristi Province (since 2020)
  - Octavio Dotel, 51, baseball player (Houston Astros, St. Louis Cardinals, New York Mets)
  - Rubby Pérez, 69, merengue singer

=== 9 ===
- Kumari Ananthan, 92, Indian politician, MP (1977–1996).
- Authentic, 29, Dutch show jumping horse, Olympic champion (2004, 2008).
- Naïma Ben Ali, 80, Tunisian First Lady (1987–1988).
- Roberto Cani, 57, Italian violinist, pancreatic cancer.
- Philippe de Gaspé Beaubien, 97, Canadian media proprietor.
- Eamon Farrell, 83, Irish footballer (Shamrock Rovers).
- Eid Al-Fayez, 79, Jordanian politician, minister of interior (2006–2009).
- Juan Manuel Gastélum, 70, Mexican politician, deputy (2012–2015) and municipal president of Tijuana (2016–2019).
- Andrew Gross, 72, American author (Reckless, The Jester, 3rd Degree), bladder cancer.
- Kim Shin-jo, 82, North Korean soldier (Unit 124), defector and pastor, participant of the 1968 Blue House raid.
- Sean King, 60, Australian footballer (West Coast Eagles), cancer.
- Fred Macquire, 88, Australian rules footballer (North Melbourne).
- Ángel L. Malavé Zayas, 86, Puerto Rican politician, mayor of Cidra (1989–2012).
- Carlos Montaldo, 85, Argentine Olympic rower (1964).
- Moon Byung-nam, 63, South Korean ballet dancer.
- Graeme Murray, 80, Canadian art director (The X-Files, Wiseguy) and production designer, Emmy winner (1997, 1998).
- Luis Felipe Noé, 91, Argentine painter and writer.
- Mel Novak, 90, American actor (Game of Death, Black Belt Jones, An Eye for an Eye).
- Sir Andrew Ogilvy-Wedderburn, 7th Baronet, 72, British Olympic bobsledder (1976, 1980).
- Phan Lương Cầm, 82, Vietnamese electrochemist.
- Frédéric Randriamamonjy, 92, Malagasy diplomat and politician, MP (1993–1998).
- Abel Rodríguez, Colombian indigenous visual artist and plant expert.
- Peter Rühring, 82, German actor (The English Patient).
- Dougie Rooney, 77, Scottish trade unionist, president of the Trades Union Congress (2009–2010).
- David Sassoon, 92, British fashion designer.
- Sybil Shainwald, 96, American lawyer and women's health activist.
- Ray Shero, 62, American ice hockey executive (Pittsburgh Penguins, New Jersey Devils), Stanley Cup champion (2009).
- Vera Sidorova, 90, Kazakh politician.
- Vitali Tasenko, 50, Russian footballer (SKA Rostov-on-Don, Istochnik Rostov-on-Don, Amur Blagoveshchensk).
- John Van Seters, 89, Canadian Biblist and religious studies scholar.
- Terje Venaas, 78, Norwegian jazz bass player.

=== 10 ===
- Stuart Barclay, 75, Australian rules footballer (Essendon, City-South, Windsor-Zillmere).
- Leo Beenhakker, 82, Dutch football manager (Ajax, Real Madrid, national team).
- Alex Bryce, 80, Scottish footballer (Dundee).
- Rosemary Candlin, 98, English crystallographer.
- John de León, 63, Cuban-American attorney.
- James Donaldson, 81, English cricketer.
- Audrey Capel Doray, 93–94, Canadian artist.
- René Marie Albert Dupont, 95, French Roman Catholic prelate, bishop of Andong (1969–1990), cerebral infarction.
- Niklas Eklund, 56, Swedish trumpeter.
- Agustín Escobar, 49, Spanish businessman, president and CEO of Siemens in Spain (since 2022), helicopter crash.
- Douglas John Hall, 97, Canadian academic.
- Arne Hamarsland, 91, Norwegian Olympic middle-distance runner (1960), cancer.
- Jan Ivarsson, 93, Swedish academic.
- Marijan Jantoljak, 85, Croatian footballer (Rijeka, Borac Banja Luka, Yugoslavia national team).
- Christoph Kohl, 64, Italian-German architect and urban planner (Brandevoort).
- Oleksandr Kosevych, 59, Ukrainian football player, manager (Kryvbas Kryvyi Rih, Zorya Luhansk, Kramatorsk) and executive.
- Ted Kotcheff, 94, Canadian-Bulgarian film director (First Blood, Weekend at Bernie's, Fun with Dick and Jane), heart failure.
- Bruce Logan, 78, British-born American visual effects artist (Star Wars, 2001: A Space Odyssey) and cinematographer (Tron).
- Looks Like Trouble, 32, Irish thoroughbred racehorse (2000 Cheltenham Gold Cup).
- Peter Lovesey, 88, British writer (Sergeant Cribb, The Last Detective, The False Inspector Dew).
- Clifford Lynch, 70, American computer scientist.
- Lucy Markovic, 27, Australian model and reality television show contestant (Australia's Next Top Model), cerebral arteriovenous malformation.
- Kenneth Mast, 99, American college athletics coach.
- Alexis Noble, 61, Uruguayan footballer (Universidad Católica, San Lorenzo, Nacional).
- Titiek Puspa, 87, Indonesian singer and songwriter, intracerebral hemorrhage.
- Doug Ringholt, 82, Australian footballer (Carlton, Claremont).
- Roshdi Abdullah Altway, 65, Singaporean convicted murderer and drug trafficker, hanged.
- John Russell, 93, Australian Olympic runner (1956).
- Mario Ernesto Sánchez, 78, Cuban-American actor (Miami Vice, The Specialist) and businessman, founder and director of Teatro Avante.
- Anne Scargill, 83, British community organizer and activist.
- Ibitola Adebisi Sotuminu, 85, Nigerian jurist.
- Susumu Sugiyama, 93, Japanese Olympic alpine skier (1956).
- Nino Tempo, 90, American singer (Nino Tempo & April Stevens, "Deep Purple") and saxophonist (The Wrecking Crew).
- Mike Wood, 72, American toy executive, co-founder of LeapFrog Enterprises, complications from Alzheimer's disease.

=== 11 ===
- Mike Berry, 82, English singer ("The Sunshine of Your Smile") and actor (Are You Being Served?, Worzel Gummidge).
- Ray Bluth, 97, American ten-pin bowler.
- Joe Eaton, 93, English footballer (Mansfield Town). (death announced on this date)
- Akbar Etemad, 95, Iranian electrical engineer, president of the Atomic Energy Organization of Iran (1974–1978).
- Alberto Franceschini, 77, Italian communist militant (Red Brigades).
- Øyunn Grindem Mogstad, 37, Norwegian high jumper.
- Laurin L. Henry, 103, American academic.
- Alice Johnson, 84, American politician, member of the Minnesota House of Representatives (1987–2001) and Minnesota Senate (2013–2017).
- Robyn Kahukiwa, 87, Australian-born New Zealand artist.
- John LaFalce, 85, American politician, member of the U.S. House of Representatives (1975–2003), New York Senate (1971–1972), and State Assembly (1973–1974).
- Petra Laseur, 85, Dutch actress.
- Mikal Mahdi, 42, American convicted spree killer, execution by firing squad.
- Don Mischer, 85, American television producer.
- Abdur Razzak Molla, 80, Indian politician, West Bengal MLA (1977–2021).
- Max Romeo, 80, Jamaican reggae musician ("Wet Dream", "Chase the Devil"), heart complications.
- Riet Roosen-van Pelt, 91, Dutch politician, MP (1986–1994).
- Gretchen Dow Simpson, 86, American artist (The New Yorker).
- Michelangelo Riccardo Maria Tiribilli, 88, Italian Roman Catholic priest, abbot of Territorial Abbey of Monte Oliveto Maggiore (1992–2010).
- Michele Traversa, 76, Italian politician, president of the Province of Catanzaro (1999–2008), deputy (2008–2013).
- Ernest Volkman, 84, American journalist and author.

=== 12 ===
- Shamsunnahar Khwaja Ahsanullah, 90, Bangladeshi politician, MP (1991–1996, 2001–2006).
- Vic Allred, 62, American politician, member of the Missouri House of Representatives (2019–2021).
- Steindór Andersen, 70, Icelandic musician (Rímur).
- Roy Thomas Baker, 78, English record producer (A Night at the Opera, The Cars, Head Games).
- Luc Réné Bell, 77, Cameroonian politician, governor of Northwest Region (1992–1996), senator (since 2013).
- Jean Breuer, 87, German motor-paced racing cyclist, world champion (1974).
- Christian Chukwu, 74, Nigerian football player (Enugu Rangers, national team) and manager (national team).
- Asdrúbal Colmenarez, 88, Venezuelan-French contemporary artist.
- Pilita Corrales, 85, Filipino singer and actress (Mars Ravelo's Darna! Ang Pagbabalik, Bride for Rent, My Illegal Wife).
- Bilal al-Droubi, Syrian military commander, shot.
- Johan Fredrik Grøgaard, 90, Norwegian dentist and author.
- Lionel Justier, 68, French footballer (Paris Saint-Germain, Brest).
- E. Jay Krause, 98, American art director and production designer, Emmy winner (1970, 1972).
- Kyren Lacy, 24, American football player (LSU Tigers, Louisiana Ragin' Cajuns), suicide by gunshot.
- Kumudini Lakhia, 94, Indian Kathak dancer.
- Gerry McNamara, 90, Canadian ice hockey player and general manager (Toronto Maple Leafs).
- Julian L. McPhillips, 78, American attorney and politician.
- Graziano Mesina, 83, Italian bandit, cancer.
- Andrea Blaugrund Nevins, 63, American film director (The Other F Word), breast cancer.
- Victor Perez, 17, American victim of police shooting, complications from sustained injuries.
- José Pliva, 58, Beninese actor, stage director, and playwright.
- Daripalli Ramaiah, 87, Indian social worker and environmental activist, heart attack.
- Michael Scott, 80, American entrepreneur, CEO of Apple Computer (1977–1981).
- Ibrahim Shika, 28, Egyptian footballer (Zamalek), rectal cancer.
- Pradip Shumsher J.B.R., 78, Nepalese police officer, inspector general (1999–2002).
- Zsolt Tiffán, 59, Hungarian winemaker and politician, MP (2010–2018).
- Jennifer Toth, 57, American journalist and writer, respiratory complications.
- Mathias Wenda, 104, Indonesian separatist militant, Commander of West Papua Revolutionary Army.
- Mary Zoghby, 91, American politician, member of the Alabama Legislature (1978–1994).

=== 13 ===
- Khurshid Ahmad, 93, Pakistani economist and politician, senator (2002–2012) and co-founder of The Islamic Foundation.
- Richard Armitage, 79, American diplomat and government official, deputy secretary of state (2001–2005), pulmonary embolism.
- Bruce Caldwell, 77, American Episcopal clergyman, bishop of Wyoming (1997–2010).
- Chuck Connelly, 70, American painter, prostate cancer.
- Miguel Cortés Miranda, 40, Mexican chemist and charged serial killer.
- Enrico Dioli, 77, Italian politician, president of the Province of Sondrio (1995–1999).
- Larry Donovan, 84, American football coach (Montana Grizzlies, BC Lions).
- Bob Garretson, 92, American racing driver (World Sportscar Championship, IMSA GT Championship).
- Charles A. Hartke, 80, American politician, member of the Illinois House of Representatives (1985–2003).
- Simon Haykin, 94, Canadian academic and electrical engineer.
- Tommy Helms, 83, American baseball player (Cincinnati Reds, Houston Astros).
- Paddy Higson, 83, Scottish film producer (Comfort and Joy, The Magdalene Sisters) and production supervisor (Gregory's Girl).
- Bank Janardhan, 74, Indian actor (Tharle Nan Maga, Shhh!, News) and comedian.
- Amber Kelleher-Andrews, 56, American relationship matchmaker, CEO of Kelleher International.
- Javed Kodu, Pakistani actor and comedian.
- Gabriel Laiseca, 88, Spanish Olympic sailor (1960).
- Jean Marsh, 90, English actress (Upstairs, Downstairs, Doctor Who, Willow) and television writer, Emmy winner (1975), complications from dementia.
- Carlos Petroni, 77, Argentine human rights activist.
- Dina Popova, 47, Ukrainian finance manager, head of Kyiv History Museum (since 2022), cancer.
- Geraldo de Souza Rodrigues, 61, Brazilian Roman Catholic prelate, bishop of Januária (since 2023).
- Salleh Kalbi, 60, Malaysian politician, MP (2008–2013).
- Kalaipuli G. Sekaran, 73, Indian film director (Oorai Therinjikitten, Kaaval Poonaigal), actor (Jameen Kottai), and producer.
- Shigeru Sugita, 78, Japanese bodybuilder.
- Inoke Takiveikata, 77, Fijian high chief and politician, Qaranivalu (since 1997).
- Albert Privet Thévenot, 79, Canadian Roman Catholic prelate, bishop of Prince Albert (2008–2021).
- Lawrence Urquhart, 89, Scottish businessman.
- Mario Vargas Llosa, 89, Peruvian writer (The Time of the Hero, The War of the End of the World, The Feast of the Goat), Nobel Prize laureate (2010).
- Roland Vími, 55, Slovak Olympic table tennis player (1992).
- Ray White, 75, American football player (San Diego Chargers, St. Louis Cardinals).
- Bob Wood, 85, Canadian politician, MP (1988–2004).

=== 14 ===
- Abdullah Ahmad Badawi, 85, Malaysian politician, prime minister (2003–2009), minister of foreign affairs (1991–1999), and MP (1978–2013), multiple organ failure.
- Irene Aderenti, 70, Swiss-born Italian politician, senator (2008–2013).
- Bob Bennett, 75, Canadian Anglican bishop of Huron (2009–2016).
- Leandro Civil, 77, Cuban Olympic middle-distance runner (1976).
- Joseph Csatari, 96, American artist.
- Filip David, 84, Serbian author and screenwriter.
- Francis Davis, 78, American author and journalist (The Village Voice, The Atlantic Monthly).
- Carlton Fairweather, 63, English football player (Wimbledon, Bromley) and manager (Sunderland Women), pancreatic cancer.
- Feng Shuyu, 100, Chinese engineer and academic.
- Joaquín Galera, 85, Spanish road bicycle racer.
- Maarten van Gent, 78, Dutch basketball coach, manager, and businessman.
- Art Green, 83, American artist, founder of The Hairy Who.
- Vernon L. Grose, 96, American aerospace engineer.
- Don Hasselbeck, 70, American football player (New England Patriots, Los Angeles Raiders, New York Giants), Super Bowl champion (1984), cardiac arrest.
- Ahmad Shamsul Islam, 100, Bangladeshi botanist.
- Jed the Fish, 69, American radio DJ (KROQ), lung cancer.
- Aliza Magen, 87, Israeli intelligence officer, deputy director of Mossad (1997–1999).
- Slobodan Milosavljević, 81, Yugoslav-born French footballer (Valenciennes) and manager (FC Sète, Aurillac FC).
- Seán Murphy, 93, Irish Gaelic footballer (Kerry, Dingle).
- Sophie Nyweide, 24, American actress (Bella, Margot at the Wedding, Noah).
- Bill Oliver, 85, American football coach (Alabama Crimson Tide, Chattanooga Mocs, Auburn Tigers).
- Christian Reim, 79, Norwegian jazz musician.
- Alexander Ruttkay, 83, Slovak archaeologist and historian.
- Peter Seiffert, 71, German operatic tenor.
- Seo Jeong-in, 88, South Korean writer.
- Jan Shipps, 95, American historian (Latter Day Saint movement).
- Jan Sovák, 72, Czech paleoartist.
- Piotr Turzyński, 60, Polish Roman Catholic prelate, auxiliary bishop of Radom (since 2015), cancer.
- Elaine Wynn, 82, American businesswoman (Wynn Resorts, Mirage Resorts).

=== 15 ===
- Patrick Adiarte, 82, Filipino-American actor (The King and I, High Time, Flower Drum Song).
- Angélico Sândalo Bernardino, 92, Brazilian Roman Catholic prelate, auxiliary bishop of São Paulo (1974–2000) and bishop of Blumenau (2000–2009).
- Richard K. Bernstein, 90, American physician.
- Jean-Pierre Bonnefous, 82, French ballet dancer and instructor (Charlotte Ballet).
- Claire Callender, 71, British academic, lung cancer.
- Wayne Clifford, 80, Canadian poet and academic.
- Mike DeBord, 69, American football coach (Michigan Wolverines, Central Michigan Chippewas, Chicago Bears).
- Enrique Duarte, 86, Peruvian Olympic basketball player (1964).
- Karen Durbin, 80, American journalist (The Village Voice), heart failure.
- Marshall Edwards, 72, American baseball player (Milwaukee Brewers).
- Grant Erickson, 77, Canadian ice hockey player (Minnesota North Stars, Boston Bruins).
- Robert Eric Frykenberg, 94, American historian and scholar.
- Madeline Hunter, 72, American author.
- Jadwiga Jankowska-Cieślak, 74, Polish actress (Another Way, Scratch, Tatarak).
- Carl M. Johnson, 91, American politician, member of the Minnesota House of Representatives (1967–1982).
- Anton Keller, 90, Swiss politician, MP (1979–1995).
- Shūhei Kishimoto, 68, Japanese politician, MP (2009–2022) and governor of Wakayama Prefecture (since 2022), septic shock.
- Joel Krosnick, 84, American cellist.
- Norman Major, 91, American politician, member of the New Hampshire House of Representatives (since 1996).
- Wink Martindale, 91, American disc jockey, game show host (Gambit, Tic-Tac-Dough) and singer ("Deck of Cards"), lymphoma.
- Billy Montgomery, 87, American politician, member of the Louisiana House of Representatives (1988–2008).
- Bill Morrisette, 93, American politician, member of the Oregon Senate (2003–2010) and House of Representatives (1999–2002), mayor of Springfield, Oregon (1989–1999).
- John L. Ray, 81, American politician, member of the Council of the District of Columbia (1979–1997). (death announced on this date)
- S. S. Stanley, 57, Indian film director (April Maadhathil, Pudhukottaiyilirundhu Saravanan, Kizhakku Kadarkarai Salai) and actor.
- John Strzemp, 73, American poker player.
- Werner Thissen, 86, German Roman Catholic prelate, auxiliary bishop of Münster (1999–2002) and archbishop of Hamburg (2002–2014).
- Reuma Weizman, 99, Israeli socialite, first lady (1993–2000).
- Leonard Zeskind, 75, American human rights activist.

=== 16 ===
- Bill Aitken, 90, Scottish-born Indian travel writer, complications from a fall.
- Nora Aunor, 71, Filipino actress (Tatlong Taong Walang Diyos, Trap, Hustisya) and singer, acute respiratory failure.
- Bill Balas, 51, American television writer and producer (Bates Motel, Animal Kingdom, Snowpiercer).
- Aaron Boupendza, 28, Gabonese footballer (Hatayspor, Zhejiang, national team), fall.
- Tomasz Burghardt, 59, Polish Catholic priest.
- Francesco Calvanese, 78, Italian politician, deputy (1994–1996).
- Dwayne Collins, 37, American basketball player (Miami Hurricanes).
- João Cravinho, 88, Portuguese politician, MEP (1989–1994) and three-time MP.
- Mohammed bin Ali Al Fayez, 87–88, Saudi politician, minister of civil service (1999–2011).
- Mac Gayden, 83, American singer and songwriter ("Everlasting Love", "My Rainbow Valley"), complications from Parkinson's disease.
- Artak Ghulyan, 66, Armenian architect (Saint John the Baptist Church, Abovyan, Armenian Cathedral of Moscow).
- Joanne Gilbert, 92, American actress (Ride Out for Revenge, Red Garters, The Great Man).
- Iain Gillies, 89, Scottish-born New Zealand footballer (Nairn County, Crewe Alexandra, New Zealand national team).
- Wilfrid Harrington, 96, Irish Dominican priest and biblical scholar.
- Ena Hartman, 93, American actress (Dan August, Terminal Island, Airport).
- Fatima Hassouna, 26, Palestinian photojournalist, missile strike.
- Roar Jens Haugen, 82, Norwegian major general.
- Hotma Sitompul, 68, Indonesian lawyer.
- Konstantin Kedrov, 82, Russian poet, philosopher, and literary critic.
- Jai Kishan, 66, Indian politician, Delhi MLA (1993–1998, 2003, 2008–2013), heart attack.
- Ed Lumley, 85, Canadian politician, MP (1974–1984).
- Steve Mapsalak, 68, Canadian politician, Nunavut MLA (2004–2008, 2013–2017).
- Roger McLachlan, 71, New Zealand bass guitarist (Little River Band), complications from pancreatic cancer.
- Don Mlangeni Nawa, 65, South African actor (Isidingo, Uzalo, The Estate).
- Birger A. Pearson, 90, American academic.
- Robert Earl Price, 83, American playwright and poet.
- Ann B. Ross, 91, American author.
- Kimmo Sasi, 73, Finnish politician, MP (1983–2015).

=== 17 ===
- Ita Aber, 93, American multimedia textile artist and art curator.
- Peter Ablinger, 66, Austrian composer.
- Josep Arnau i Figuerola, 82, Spanish engineer and politician, deputy (1979–1982) and president of the Province of Girona (1987–1994).
- Tetiana Barantsova, 51, Ukrainian disability rights activist.
- Colin Berry, 79, British radio disc jockey, presenter and newsreader (BBC Radio 2).
- Chuck Ferries, 85, American Olympic alpine skier (1960, 1964).
- Holly Humphrey, 68, American pulmonologist and academic.
- Mizuki Itagaki, 24, Japanese actor (Hot Gimmick: Girl Meets Boy, Keep Your Hands Off Eizouken!, Solomon's Perjury). (death announced on this date)
- Rose Kerketta, 84, Indian writer, poet and tribal rights activist.
- Peter Kostelka, 78, Austrian politician, member of the Federal Council (1990) and the National Council (1994–2001).
- Simon Lehoko, 74, South African footballer (Vaal Professionals, Kaizer Chiefs, national team).
- Roberto Muñoz, 73, German-born Canadian film producer (Lost Penny, Lazer Us, Under Jakob's Ladder) and director, colon cancer.
- Álamo Pérez-Luna, 61, Peruvian journalist and television presenter.
- Ronald Scott, 107, Argentine naval aviator (Fleet Air Arm).
- Ljubomir Simović, 89, Serbian writer, playwright, and scriptwriter, member of the Serbian Academy of Sciences and Arts.
- Jaromír Štětina, 82, Czech journalist, writer and politician, MEP (2014–2019) and senator (2004–2014), cardiac arrest.
- Joe Thompson, 36, English footballer (Rochdale, Tranmere Rovers, Southport), lymphoma.
- Tom Walmsley, 76, Canadian playwright and screenwriter.
- Xu Lianjie, 72, Chinese businessman, co-founder of Hengan International.
- Billy Young, 87, Irish football player (Bohemians) and manager (Bohemians, Shamrock Rovers).
- Angelo Zgorelec, 84–85, Croatian publisher, founder of Personal Computer World.

=== 18 ===
- A. P. Balachandran, 87, Indian theoretical physicist.
- Ray Baughman, 82, American chemist and nanotechnologist.
- James Bieri, 97, American psychologist and biographer.
- Christiane Brunner, 78, Swiss politician, MP (1991–2007).
- Mike Chase, 73, American stock car racing driver (NASCAR Winston West Series).
- Jean Chérasse, 92, French film director, writer, and producer (Moonlight in Maubeuge, La Vendetta).
- Suliman Eid, 63, Egyptian actor.
- Ollie Gene Embry, 96, American bank robber.
- Gerhard Hager, 82, Austrian politician, MEP (1996–2004).
- Patricio Infante Alfonso, 95, Chilean Roman Catholic prelate, auxiliary bishop of Santiago de Chile (1984–1990) and archbishop of Antofagasta (1990–2004).
- Zsuzsa Kakuk, 99, Hungarian linguist and Turkologist.
- Mathew Kalarickal, 77, Indian cardiologist.
- Masaaki Koyama, 90, Japanese baseball player (Hanshin Tigers, Lotte Orions) and coach (Seibu Lions).
- Irwin Lachman, 94, American engineer, co-inventor of the catalytic converter.
- Harry T. Lemmon, 94, American judge, justice of the Louisiana Supreme Court (1980–2001).
- Lars Gunnar Lie, 86, Norwegian politician, minister of transport and communications (1989–1990), MP (1985–2001).
- Joseph M. Marshall III, 80, American historian.
- Mick McGrath, 89, Irish footballer (Blackburn Rovers, national team).
- George McMillan, 81, American politician, lieutenant governor of Alabama (1979–1983), complications from surgery.
- Stina Oscarson, 49, Swedish theater director, author and debater, anorexia nervosa.
- Jean Paelinck, 94, Belgian economist.
- Julia Mary Parsons, 104, American cryptanalyst.
- Gys Pitzer, 85, South African rugby union player (Northern Transvaal, national team).
- Nikola Pokrivač, 39, Croatian footballer (Varteks, AS Monaco, national team), traffic collision.
- Paul Rinaldi, 63, American visual artist, cancer.
- Clodagh Rodgers, 78, Northern Irish singer ("Come Back and Shake Me", "Jack in the Box").
- William Sheret, 96, Scottish showjumper and trainer.
- Julieta Szönyi, 75, Romanian actress (Felix and Otilia, Toate pînzele sus).
- Damien Thomas, 83, English actor (Twins of Evil, Pirates, Never Let Me Go), progressive supranuclear palsy.
- Erich Tomek, 94, Austrian production manager, screenwriter (Tante Trude aus Buxtehude, Sunshine Reggae in Ibiza), and film producer (Hot Pavements of Cologne).
- Henri Torre, 92, French politician, deputy (1968–1980) and senator (1980–2008).
- Rodolfo Torres Medina, 76, Mexican politician, mayor of Chihuahua (1989–1992) and rector of the Autonomous University of Chihuahua (1985–1989), cancer.
- Takashi Yamaguchi, 88, Japanese actor (Minamoto no Yoshitsune, Kaze to Kumo to Niji to, Bandits vs. Samurai Squadron), lung cancer.
- Aimé Emmanuel Yoka, 93, Congolese politician, mayor of Brazzaville (1997–1999).
- Noreen Young, 85, Canadian puppeteer (Under the Umbrella Tree, Sesame Park), stroke.

=== 19 ===
- Wayne Angell, 94, American economist, member of the Federal Reserve Board of Governors (1986–1994).
- George Barr, 88, American science fiction artist.
- Bev Beaver, 77, Canadian ice hockey player and bowler.
- Julian Benson, 54, Australian-born Irish choreographer (Dancing with the Stars), complications from cystic fibrosis.
- Damien Broderick, 80, Australian author (The White Abacus, Transcension, K-Machines).
- Jacques Camatte, 89–90, French writer and philosopher.
- Rodney Francis Cameron, 72, Australian serial killer, cancer.
- Aurelio Costarella, 60, Australian fashion designer, complications from Creutzfeldt–Jakob disease.
- Colette Durruti, Spanish-born French businesswoman and activist.
- József Garami, 85, Hungarian football player (Pécsi Dózsa, Pécsi Vasutas SK) and manager (national team).
- Peter Hilt, 83, New Zealand politician, MP (1990–1996).
- Barry Hoban, 85, English Olympic racing cyclist (1960).
- Ron Hood, 55, American politician, member of the Ohio House of Representatives (1995–2000, 2005–2006, 2013–2020).
- Karen Johnson, 81, American politician, member of the Florida Senate (1992–1996).
- Jaroslav Kubečka, 90, Slovak economist and politician.
- Thomas G. Kurtz, 83, American mathematician and statistician.
- Alan Lamb, 81, Scottish-born Australian artist and composer.
- Christian Langballe, 58, Danish politician, MP (2011–2019), brain cancer.
- Meir Mazuz, 80, Tunisian-born Israeli rabbi.
- Herbert Migdoll, 90, American painter.
- Alan Harris Nevas, 97, American jurist and politician, judge of the U.S. District Court for Connecticut (1985–2009) and member of the Connecticut House of Representatives (1971–1977).
- Meir Nitzan, 93, Romanian-born Israeli politician, mayor of Rishon LeZion (1983–2008).
- Henry Phillips, 78, Panamanian Olympic weightlifter (1972).
- Bill Ramos, 69, American politician, member of the Washington House of Representatives (2019–2025) and State Senate (since 2025).
- Bruce J. Scott, 92, American politician, member of the Florida House of Representatives (1961–1963).
- Carlo Senaldi, 83, Italian politician, deputy (1983–1992).
- Jay Sigel, 81, American golfer, pancreatic cancer.
- Niwat Srisawat, 77, Thai footballer (Raj-Vithi, PAT, national team).
- Dragoljub Stamenković, 70, Serbian politician, MP (1994–2007).
- Chum Taylor, 98, Australian motorcycle speedway rider.
- Tassilo Thierbach, 68, German Olympic pair skater (1980, 1984), world champion (1982).
- Guy Ullens, 90, Belgian art collector and philanthropist.
- Aaron Woods, 75, American politician, member of the Oregon Senate (since 2023), pancreatic cancer.

=== 20 ===
- Ulrich Aron, 80, Surinamese politician, chairman of the National Assembly (1986–1987).
- Jeremy Bernstein, 95, American physicist.
- Black Terry, 72, Mexican professional wrestler (CMLL, IWRG, UWA).
- Cristina Buarque, 74, Brazilian singer and composer.
- Russell Doust, 97, Australian librarian.
- Jeff Evans, 70, Welsh cricket umpire.
- Kristin Feireiss, 82, German architect and curator, director of the Netherlands Architecture Institute (1996–2001).
- Bob Filner, 82, American politician, member of the U.S. House of Representatives (1993–2012) and mayor of San Diego (2012–2013).
- Hugo Gatti, 80, Argentine footballer (Gimnasia La Plata, Boca Juniors, national team), infection following hip surgery.
- Albertus Geldermans, 90, Dutch racing cyclist.
- Pieta Greaves, 46, British archaeologist and conservator.
- Kari Kaaja, 84, Finnish Olympic modern pentathlete (1964).
- John Bashaija Kazoora, 66, Ugandan soldier and politician.
- János Kocsis, 74, Hungarian Olympic wrestler (1976, 1980).
- George Lee, 90, American ballet dancer.
- Juan José Llach, 80, Argentine economist and sociologist, minister of education (1999–2000).
- Werner Lorant, 76, German football player (Rot-Weiss Essen, Eintracht Frankfurt) and manager.
- Chito Martínez, 59, Belizean-American baseball player (Baltimore Orioles), heart attack.
- Neža Maurer, 94, Slovene poet and writer.
- David Norman, 83, Australian footballer (Collingwood).
- Nana Osei Bonsu II, 85, Ghanaian traditional ruler, regent of Asante (1999).
- Mike Patrick, 80, American sports broadcaster (ESPN, Maryland Terrapins, Jacksonville Sharks).
- Vladimír Popovič, 85, Slovak painter, visual artist, and academic.
- Kimble Rendall, 67–68, Australian musician (XL Capris, Hoodoo Gurus) and film director (Guardians of the Tomb). (death announced on this date)
- Mariya Shubina, 94, Russian sprint canoer, Olympic champion (1960).
- Krishan Chandra Singhal, 83, Indian pharmacologist.
- Tes Sambath, 24, Cambodian footballer (Visakha, national team), drowned.
- Arild Underdal, 78, Norwegian political scientist, rector of the University of Oslo (2002–2006).
- Richard B. Wilke, 94, American Methodist bishop.

=== 21 ===
- Hajji Alejandro, 70, Filipino singer and actor, colon cancer.
- Peter B. Andrews, 87, American mathematician (Q0).
- Michel Anglade, 78, French rugby union (Tarbes) and league player (Saint-Gaudens, national team).
- Ruth Beaglehole, 81, New Zealand-born American educator.
- Urszula Figwer, 93, Polish Olympic javelin thrower (1956, 1960).
- Peter Fleming, 66–67, British medieval historian.
- Pope Francis, 88, Argentine Roman Catholic prelate, pope (since 2013), archbishop of Buenos Aires (1998–2013), stroke and cardio-circulatory collapse.
- Walter Frankenstein, 100, German-born Swedish engineer and Holocaust survivor.
- Herbert J. Gans, 97, German-born American sociologist.
- Harold Hair, 92, American baseball player (Birmingham Black Barons, Kansas City Monarchs).
- Cyril Höschl, 75, Czech psychiatrist and academic.
- Will Hutchins, 94, American actor (Sugarfoot, Shangani Patrol, Spinout), respiratory failure.
- Cecil Irwin, 83, English footballer (Sunderland).
- Gerard Kennedy, 93, Australian actor (Hunter, Division 4, Skyways).
- Peter von Matt, 87, Swiss philologist and author.
- Johanna Matz, 92, Austrian actress (Hannerl, Die Jungfrau auf dem Dach, The White Horse Inn).
- Josep Montserrat i Torrents, 92, Spanish writer, philosopher and historian.
- Volodymyr Moroz, 57, Ukrainian power plant executive and politician, MP (since 2019).
- Sarmad Jalal Osmany, 74, Pakistani jurist, justice of the Supreme Court (2008–2011), justice (1998–2009) and chief justice (2009–2011) of the Sindh High Court, cancer.
- Zakir Qureshi, 58, Pakistani television chef (Hum TV, Masala TV).
- Dominick J. Ruggerio, 76, American politician, member (since 1985) and president (since 2017) of the Rhode Island Senate, member of the Rhode Island House of Representatives (1981–1985), cancer.
- Hisashi Shinma, 90, Japanese Hall of Fame professional wrestling booker and promoter (WWF, NJPW), co-founder of Universal Lucha Libre.
- Tilakdhari Singh, 87, Indian politician, MP (1984–1989, 1999–2004).
- Clarence O. Smith, 92, American media executive, co-founder of Essence.
- Ed Smylie, 95, American aerospace engineer (Apollo 13).
- Haakon Stein, 85, German Olympic fencer (1964).
- James L. Swanson, 66, American historian, brain cancer.
- Odile de Vasselot, 103, French resistance fighter.
- Alexander Vika, 91, Slovak sculptor.
- Francis Zammit Dimech, 70, Maltese politician, minister of foreign affairs (2012–2013) and MEP (2017–2019), cancer.

=== 22 ===
- David Briggs, 82, American Hall of Fame keyboardist (Muscle Shoals Rhythm Section, The Nashville A-Team, TCB Band) and record producer.
- David Clunie, 77, Scottish footballer (Heart of Midlothian, Berwick Rangers, St Johnstone).
- Alexandra Fröhlich, 58, German journalist and writer, shot.
- Odd Magne Gridseth, 65, Norwegian jazz bassist.
- Dilyana Grozdanova, 67, Bulgarian politician, MP (2001–2005).
- Kenneth Hodges, 73, American politician, member of the South Carolina House of Representatives (2005–2017).
- Kang Ji-yong, 35, South Korean footballer (Bucheon, Gangwon, Pohang Steelers).
- Jules Maidoff, 91, American artist.
- V. Y. Mudimbe, 83, Congolese philosopher.
- Puan Noor Aishah, 91, Singaporean activist and scouting leader, spouse of the president (1965–1970).
- Michael O'Brien, 91, Irish politician and activist.
- Lar Park Lincoln, 63, American actress (House II: The Second Story, Friday the 13th Part VII: The New Blood, Knots Landing).
- Erik Ruus, 62, Estonian actor (The Birdwatcher, Firewater, All My Lenins).
- Keith Stackpole, 84, Australian cricketer (Victoria, national team).
- Tibor Szász, 76, Hungarian pianist and author.
- Edwin F. Taylor, 93, American physicist.
- Durlav Kumar Thapa, 95, Nepalese police officer, inspector general (1978–1982).
- Zurab Tsereteli, 91, Russian-Georgian sculptor (Birth of the New World, To the Struggle Against World Terrorism), painter, and architect, president of the Russian Academy of Arts (since 1997), cardiac arrest.
- Sinamandla Zondi, 22, South African footballer (Durban City).

=== 23 ===
- Eugène Koffi Adoboli, 90, Togolese politician, prime minister (1999–2000).
- Shuaibu Babas, Nigerian politician, member of the Adamawa State House of Assembly.
- Hilson Baptiste, 77, Antiguan politician, member of the House of Representatives (1994–2014).
- Barry Benepe, 96, American urban planner (Farmers' markets in New York City).
- Jonnie Boer, 60, Dutch chef and restaurant owner (De Librije), pulmonary embolism.
- Tom Brown, 84, American football player (Green Bay Packers, Washington Redskins) and baseball player (Washington Senators), complications from dementia.
- Chris Cauwenberghs, 78, Belgian actor (Hector, Koko Flanel, Thuis), complications from heart failure.
- Chozin Chumaidy, 76, Indonesian politician, member of the West Java Regional House of Representatives (1977–1987) and House of Representatives (1992–2009).
- Robert S. Douglas, 93, American sailor, founder of The Black Dog.
- Lana du Pont, 85, American Olympic equestrian eventer (1964).
- Waltraut Haas, 97, Austrian actress (Der Hofrat Geiger, Mariandl, The White Horse Inn).
- Ilyas Halil, 94, Turkish-born Canadian banker.
- E. L. Henry, 89, American politician, member (1968–1980) and speaker (1972–1980) of the Louisiana House of Representatives.
- Jim Herriot, 85, Scottish footballer (Dunfermline Athletic, Birmingham City, national team).
- Billy Joe MacLean, 88, Canadian politician, Nova Scotia MLA (1981–1988) and mayor of Port Hawkesbury (1994–2016), Group A streptococcal infection.
- Steve McMichael, 67, American Hall of Fame football player (Chicago Bears) and professional wrestler (WCW), Super Bowl champion (1986), complications from amyotrophic lateral sclerosis.
- Fouad Mebazaa, 91, Tunisian politician, speaker of the Chamber of Deputies (1997–2011) and acting president (2011).
- Jaromír Paciorek, 45, Czech footballer (SBV Excelsior, Fortuna Sittard).
- Frank Parker, 85, American football player (Cleveland Browns, Pittsburgh Steelers, New York Giants).
- Lulu Roman, 78, American comedian (Hee Haw) and gospel singer.
- James M. Stayer, 90, Canadian historian.
- Peter Taaffe, 83, British Marxist militant.
- David Thomas, 71, American singer (Rocket from the Tombs, Pere Ubu) and songwriter ("30 Seconds Over Tokyo").
- Angela Tillmann, 68, German politician, member of the Landtag of North Rhine-Westphalia (2005–2010, 2016–2017).
- Jai Verma, 75, Indian-born British writer and poet.
- Al Vezza, 90, American computer scientist.
- Wen Junfeng, 96, Chinese aircraft engine designer and academic (Yantai University).

=== 24 ===
- Michel Aglietta, 87, French economist and academic (Paris Nanterre University).
- Arthur Alper, 96, American volleyball player.
- Lúcia Alves, 76, Brazilian actress (Irmãos Coragem, Barriga de Aluguel, O Cravo e a Rosa), pancreatic cancer.
- Friedrich Baumbach, 89, German chess player.
- Rita Briansky, 99, Polish-born Canadian painter and printmaker.
- Vladimir Burkov, 85, Russian control theorist and academic (Moscow Institute of Physics and Technology).
- Bruce Cline, 93, Canadian ice hockey player (New York Rangers).
- Randolph Coleman, 87, American composer.
- Sandra Domínguez, 36–37, Mexican Mixe indigenous women rights activist. (body discovered on this date)
- Trish Fraser, 59, New Zealand soil scientist, brain cancer.
- Giancarlo Gentilini, 95, Italian politician, mayor of Treviso (1994–2003).
- Jean-Claude Germain, 85, Canadian playwright, author, and journalist (L'aut'journal, Maclean's).
- Happy Clapper, 14, Australian Thoroughbred racehorse, colic. (death announced on this date)
- Rob Holland, 50, American aerobatic pilot, plane crash.
- Daniela Kaneva, 87, Bulgarian journalist.
- Jack Katz, 97, American comic book artist (Sub-Mariner).
- Steve Kiner, 77, American Hall of Fame football player (Tennessee Volunteers, New England Patriots, Houston Oilers).
- Daniel L. Kinnaman, 92, American politician, member of the Wyoming House of Representatives (1975–1978).
- Caroline Knox, 88, American poet.
- Kari Løvaas, 85, Norwegian opera singer.
- David McDowall, 70, British major general.
- Jamie McMann, 48, American record producer.
- María del Carmen Morales, 43, Mexican human rights activist, shot.
- Greg Olejack, 70, American college football player (Louisville) and coach (Muhlenberg).
- Roy Phillips, 83, British musician (The Peddlers).
- Ladislav Polka, 73, Slovak politician, MP (1992–2006).
- Nicola Rivelli, 69, Italian politician, deputy (1994–2001).
- Ivan Sotirov, 90, Bulgarian footballer (Botev Plovdiv).
- Edy Star, 87, Brazilian singer-songwriter, actor, and visual artist.

=== 25 ===
- Aboubakar Cissé, 22, Malian muslim man, stabbed.
- Joey Archer, 87, American boxer.
- Donald W. Bennett, 97, American major general.
- Sir Derek Boorman, 94, British lieutenant general, chief of Defence Intelligence (1986–1988).
- Tom R. Burns, 88, American sociologist.
- Richard E. Carey, 97, American Marine Corps Lieutenant General.
- Arthur Charbonneau, 85, Canadian politician, British Columbia MLA (1991–1996).
- Bob Cleroux, 87, Canadian boxer.
- Michael Hely-Hutchinson, 8th Earl of Donoughmore, 97, Irish peer, member of the House of Lords (1981–1999).
- John S. Foster Jr., 102, American physicist, under secretary of defense for research and engineering (1965–1973).
- Steven Gitomer, 82, American electrical engineer.
- Virginia Giuffre, 41, American-Australian justice advocate, suicide.
- Alexis Herman, 77, American politician and social worker, secretary of labor (1997–2001).
- Walt Jocketty, 74, American baseball executive (St. Louis Cardinals, Cincinnati Reds).
- Krishnaswamy Kasturirangan, 84, Indian space scientist and politician, chairperson of the Indian Space Research Organisation (1994–2003) and MP (2003–2009).
- Greg King, 60, American historian and author.
- Angela Lemaire, 80, British artist and printmaker.
- Philip Lowrie, 88, English actor (Coronation Street, Victoria Wood, Home Fires).
- Noël Minga, 77, Congolese football player and manager.
- Yaroslav Moskalik, 58, Russian general, car bombing.
- Malcolm Potts, 90, British human reproductive scientist.
- Hans-Günter Richardi, 85, German author and journalist (Süddeutsche Zeitung).
- Pere Sampol, 73, Spanish politician, vice president of the Balearic Islands (1999–2003) and senator (2007–2011).
- Peter Sarkisian, 60, American artist.
- J. C. Snead, 84, American golfer, cancer.
- Stanley Tshosane, 68, Botswanan football manager (Mogoditshane Fighters, national team).
- Richard Wernick, 91, American composer, Pulitzer Prize for Music (1977).
- Wu Guixian, 87, Chinese politician, vice premier (1975–1977).

=== 26 ===
- Charles Beare, 87, British violin expert and craftsman.
- Andy Bey, 85, American jazz singer and pianist.
- Max Bolkart, 92, German Olympic ski jumper (1956, 1960, 1964).
- Joshua Clover, 62, American poet and writer.
- Jair da Costa, 84, Brazilian footballer (Portuguesa, Inter Milan, national team), world champion (1962).
- Michele Di Ruberto, 90, Italian Roman Catholic prelate, secretary for the Causes of Saints (2007–2010).
- Donato Giuliani, 78, Italian racing cyclist.
- Daud Haider, 73, Bangladeshi poet.
- Vic Harris, 75, American baseball player (Texas Rangers, Chicago Cubs).
- José Carlos, 83, Portuguese football player (Sporting, national team) and manager (Gil Vicente).
- Bernhard Korte, 86, German mathematician and computer scientist.
- M. G. S. Narayanan, 92, Indian historian, chairman of the Indian Council of Historical Research (2001–2003).
- S. Pattabhiraman, 79, Indian lieutenant general, vice chair of the army staff (2005–2006).
- Rogelio Rivas, 80, Spanish Olympic sprinter (1964).
- Donald Ross, Lord Ross, 98, Scottish judge, Lord Justice Clerk (1985–1997)
- David Trotman, 73, British mathematician.

=== 27 ===
- Antonio Avelar, 66, Mexican boxer, WBC world flyweight champion (1981–82).
- Dick Barnett, 88, American basketball player (New York Knicks, Los Angeles Lakers, Syracuse Nationals), NBA champion (1970, 1973).
- Jiggly Caliente, 44, Filipino-American drag performer (RuPaul's Drag Race, Drag Race Philippines) and actress (Pose), sepsis.
- Giuseppe Cavallotto, 85, Italian Roman Catholic prelate, bishop of Cuneo and Fossano (2005–2015).
- Cora Sue Collins, 98, American actress (The Adventures of Tom Sawyer, Anna Karenina, The Unexpected Father), complications from a stroke.
- Kamalini Dutt, 74, Indian television producer and dancer.
- Rita Flores de Wallace, 88, Mexican folklorist.
- John Gregson, 85, English football player (Mansfield Town, Cambridge United).
- Ken Hancock, 87, English football player (Port Vale, Ipswich Town) and manager (Leek Town).
- Wizz Jones, 86, English acoustic guitarist and singer-songwriter.
- Michelle Marder Kamhi, 87, American independent scholar and critic.
- Suki Seokyeong Kang, 48, South Korean visual artist.
- Paul Lewis, 92, American racing driver.
- Liberty Island, 5, Japanese Thoroughbred racehorse, euthanized.
- Stan Love, 76, American basketball player (Baltimore Bullets, Los Angeles Lakers, San Antonio Spurs).
- Ray McCallum, 67, American karateka and kickboxer.
- Petr Neuman, 47, Czech chess grandmaster.
- Ed Pink, 94, American Hall of Fame drag racing engine builder.
- Saadallah Agha al-Qalaa, 74, Syrian politician, minister of tourism (2001–2011).
- James Swetnam, 97, American Jesuit priest and biblical scholar.
- Jorge Traverso, 80, Uruguayan journalist, complications from heart surgery.
- François-Xavier Villain, 74, French politician, mayor of Cambrai (since 1992) and deputy (2002–2017).

=== 28 ===
- Arvo Aalto, 92, Finnish politician, minister of labour (1977–1981).
- Karl Ameriks, 77, American philosopher.
- Peter Bosustow, 67, Australian footballer (Perth, Carlton).
- Brendan Comiskey, 89, Irish Roman Catholic prelate, bishop of Ferns (1984–2002).
- Owen Dolan, 96, New Zealand Roman Catholic prelate, coadjutor bishop of Palmerston North (1995–2004).
- Jane Gardam, 96, English writer (The Queen of the Tambourine, Old Filth, God on the Rocks).
- Juana Gutierrez, 93, Mexican-American political activist.
- George Holmes, 98, British civil servant and forester.
- Andrew Karpen, 59, American independent film studio executive (Bleecker Street, Focus Features), glioblastoma.
- Shaji N. Karun, 73, Indian film director (Piravi, Swaham, Vanaprastham).
- Dick Lasse, 89, American football player (Pittsburgh Steelers, Washington Redskins, New York Giants).
- Giovanni Lievore, 93, Italian Olympic javelin thrower (1956).
- Mike Peters, 66, Welsh rock singer (The Alarm, Big Country) and songwriter ("Sixty Eight Guns"), chronic lymphocytic leukaemia.
- Priscilla Pointer, 100, American actress (Carrie, Dallas, Blue Velvet).
- Lupe Sanchez, 63, American football player (Pittsburgh Steelers).
- Stanley Girard Schlarman, 91, American Roman Catholic prelate, bishop of Dodge City (1983–1998) and auxiliary bishop of Belleville (1979–1983).
- Ron Sigsworth, 63, Australian rugby league footballer (Newtown Jets, Canberra Raiders, Castleford).
- Mary Bowes-Lyon, Countess of Strathmore and Kinghorne, 92, British peeress and châtelaine of Glamis Castle.
- Shigeru Tsuyuguchi, 93, Japanese actor (Unholy Desire, Whisper of the Heart, The Adventures of Milo and Otis).
- John Twomey, 101, American track and field athlete.
- Richard Vines, 71, British food critic (Bloomberg News).

=== 29 ===
- Dilshi Amshika, 15-16, Sri Lankan student, suicide.
- James Cacheris, 91, American jurist, three-time judge of the U.S. District Court for the Eastern District of Virginia.
- Robert Campbell, 88, American architect and architecture critic (The Boston Globe), complications from Parkinson's disease.
- Choi Gwi-seung, 83, South Korean Olympic modern pentathlete (1964).
- Roy Cooper, 69, American rodeo cowboy, house fire.
- Ron Curl, 75, American football player (Michigan State Spartans, Toronto Argonauts).
- Chuck Ehin, 63, American football player (San Diego Chargers), pancreatic cancer.
- Samuel Escobar, 90, Peruvian theologian.
- Edgardo Espiritu, 89, Filipino politician, secretary of finance (1998–1999).
- Angela Francese, 75, Italian politician, deputy (1979–1992), traffic collision.
- Bernard Garfield, 100, American bassoonist, composer and teacher.
- David Horowitz, 86, American writer and activist, founder of the David Horowitz Freedom Center, cancer.
- Ruth Howes, 80, American nuclear physicist.
- Tommy Keenan, 81, Irish Gaelic football player (Dunmore MacHales, Galway) and coach.
- Charles Mayer, 89, Canadian politician, MP (1979–1993) and minister of agriculture (1994).
- Ferenc Mohácsi, 95, Hungarian sprint canoeist, Olympic bronze medallist (1956).
- Robert A. G. Monks, 91, American shareholder activist and politician.
- Paul Omu, 84, Nigerian general and politician, governor of Cross River State (1975–1978).
- Christfried Schmidt, 92, German composer and arranger.
- Álvaro Silva, 60, Portuguese Olympic sprinter (1988, 1992).
- Valeriu Tabără, 75, Romanian politician, deputy (1992–2000, 2004–2012), cardiac arrest.
- Jyoti Prakash Tamang, 63, Indian microbiologist and academic (Sikkim University).
- John Thornton, 55, American football player (Cleveland Browns, Minnesota Vikings).
- David Tracy, 86, American Catholic theologian and priest.
- Ed Van Impe, 84, Canadian ice hockey player (Chicago Blackhawks, Philadelphia Flyers, Pittsburgh Penguins).

=== 30 ===
- Ramdas Ambatkar, 64, Indian politician, Maharashtra MLC (2018–2024).
- Ferdinand Botsy, 84, Malagasy Roman Catholic prelate, bishop of Ambanja (1976–1997).
- Peter Burridge, 91, English footballer (Millwall, Crystal Palace, Charlton Athletic).
- James H. Carrington, 76, American actor (Children of a Lesser God, Real Genius) and screenwriter (Fluke).
- Warren I. Cohen, 90, American historian, pneumonia.
- Joseph H. Eberly, 89, American physicist and academic (University of Rochester).
- Henry Friesen, 90, Canadian endocrinologist.
- George Hacker, 97, British Anglican prelate, Bishop of Penrith (1979–1994).
- Ben Harbin, 61, American politician, member of the Georgia House of Representatives (1994–2015).
- Zeno Hastenteufel, 78, Brazilian Roman Catholic prelate, bishop of Frederico Westphalen (2002–2007) and Novo Hamburgo (2007–2022).
- Ruth Hieronymi, 77, German politician, MEP (1999–2009).
- Susan Holmes, 82, American politician, member of the Georgia House of Representatives (2011–2023) and mayor of Monticello (1998–2010).
- Rafiz Ismayilov, 86, Azerbaijani film director and screenwriter.
- William Kund, 79, American Olympic cyclist (1964).
- Inah Canabarro Lucas, 116, Brazilian supercentenarian, world's oldest living person (since 2024).
- Thomas M. T. Niles, 85, American diplomat, ambassador to Canada (1985–1989), the European Union (1989–1991), and Greece (1993–1997), cancer.
- Park Hee-gon, 56, South Korean film director (Insadong Scandal, Perfect Game, Fengshui).
- Karel Paukert, 90, Czech-born American organist, choir director and educator.
- D. Gregory Powell, 77, Canadian emergency medicine physician.
- Nahid Rachlin, 85, Iranian-born American novelist, stroke.
- Jerome Ringo, 70, American environmentalist.
- Phil Roberto, 76, Canadian ice hockey player (Montreal Canadiens, St. Louis Blues, Detroit Red Wings).
- Frits Roessel, 88, Dutch chess player.
- Bahman Salehnia, 86, Iranian football coach (Malavan, Chooka Talesh).
- Seán Sherwin, 78–79, Irish politician, TD (1970–1973).
- Jeff Sperbeck, 62, American sports agent, fall.
- Sunny Thomas, 83, Indian sport shooting coach.
- Ronald Sapa Tlau, 71, Indian politician, MP (2014–2020).
- Joe Louis Walker, 75, American blues musician.
- Charles Ong'ondo Were, Kenyan politician, member of the National Assembly (since 2017), shot.
- Jules Wijdenbosch, 83, Surinamese politician, president (1996–2000) and prime minister (1987–1988).
