= Dridi =

Dridi is a Tunisian surname. Notable people with the surname include:

- Adel Dridi (died 2025), Tunisian businessman
- Karim Dridi (born 1961), Tunisian film director and screenwriter
- Lassaad Dridi (born 1997), Tunisian footballer and manager
- Wahida Dridi, Tunisian actress
