= Richard Vines =

Richard Vines may refer to:

- Richard Vines (minister) (1600–1656), English clergyman
- Richard Vines (colonist) (1585–1651), English colonial explorer
- Richard Vines (food critic) (1954–2025), British food critic

== See also ==
- Richard David Vine, American diplomat (10 December 1925 – 14 May 2008)
