= Nocera =

Nocera can refer to:

== Places ==
- Nocera Inferiore, a comune in Campania, Italy
- Nocera Superiore, a comune in Campania, Italy
- Nocera Terinese, a comune in Calabria, Italy
- Nocera Umbra, a comune in Umbria, Italy
- Nocera dei Pagani
- Diocese of Nocera, a Roman Catholic diocese in Italy
- Diocese of Nocera Inferiore-Sarno, a Roman Catholic diocese in Italy

== People ==
- Daniel G. Nocera (born 1957), inorganic chemist
- Gwladys Nocera (born 1975), French golfer
- Joe Nocera (born 1952), American journalist
- John Nocera (1934–1981), American football player
- Luigi Nocera (1955–2025), Italian politician
- Nocera (singer) (born 1967 as Maria Nocera), American singer and DJ
- Matteo Nocera (born 1999), Italian rugby union player
- Paolo Maria Nocera (born 1985), Italian racing driver

== Other ==
- Battle of Nocera
- Nocera (grape), a Sicilian red grape variety
