= Kostelka =

Kostelka (feminine: Kostelková) is a Czech surname. Notable people with the surname include:

- Miroslav Kostelka (born 1951), Czech diplomat and politician
- Peter Kostelka (1946–2025), Austrian politician
