= Kamalini =

Kamalini may refer to:

- Kamalinee Mukherjee (born 1984), Indian actress
- Kamalini Asthana, Indian dancer
- Kamalini Ramdas, British business professor
- Kamalini Mukherji (born 1979), Indian vocalist
- Kamalini Dutt (died 2025), Indian dancer
- Kamalini Sarabhai (1925–1981), British clinician

== Surname ==
- Gunalan Kamalini (born 2008), Indian cricketer
