= Flego =

Flego is a surname. Notable people with the surname include:

- Edo Flego (born 1975), Croatian football player
- Enzo Flego (1940–2025), Italian politician
- Igor Flego (born 1961), Yugoslav tennis player
- Lorella Flego (born 1974), Slovenian television presenter
- Valter Flego (born 1972), Croatian politician
