= Holly Humphrey =

American pulmonologist and academic (1956–2025)

Holly J. Humphrey (November 28, 1956 – April 17, 2025) was an American pulmonologist and academic who was the president of the Josiah Macy Jr. Foundation and the Ralph W. Gerard Emeritus Professor in Medicine at the University of Chicago Pritzker School of Medicine.

== Background ==
Humphrey was born on November 28, 1956. In 1979, Humphrey graduated from North Central College.

Humphrey earned her MD from the University of Chicago in 1983. She stayed at the University of Chicago for her residency in internal medicine, and fellowship in pulmonology and critical care medicine.

Humphrey was married to Duane Follman, a cardiologist. She died in Hinsdale, Illinois on April 17, 2025, at the age of 68.

== Career ==
After completing her medical training Humphrey stayed on at the University of Chicago, joining the faculty as an assistant professor in 1989. That year, she and a colleague led the first white coat ceremony in the country at the University.

Humphrey was the director of the Pritzker School of Medicine's Internal Medicine residency program for 14 years. Before joining the Macy Foundation, she spent 15 years as the Ralph W. Gerard Professor in Medicine and Dean for Medical Education at the University of Chicago.

Humphrey joined the Macy Foundation in 2018. She was the Ralph W. Gerard Emeritus Professor in Medicine. She served as the chair of the Kaiser Permanente Bernard J. Tyson School of Medicine’s board of directors. She previously served as chair of the American Board of Internal Medicine and of the American Board of Internal Medicine Foundation. She was a visiting professor at Harvard Medical School, Johns Hopkins School of Medicine, Perelman School of Medicine, Washington University School of Medicine, and Georgetown University Medical Center. She authored more than 60 academic publications.

Humphrey was elected to the National Academy of Medicine in 2020.
