= John de León =

American lawyer

John de Leon
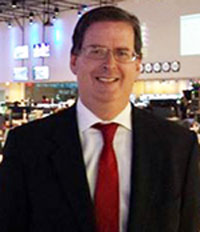
- Born: February 14, 1962; Miami, FL
- Died: April 10, 2025 (aged 63); Miami, Florida, U.S.
- Education: University of Miami (A.B.); Georgetown University Law Center (J.D.); Columbia University School of International and Public Affairs (M.I.A.)
- Occupation: Civil-rights attorney

John de Leon (February 14, 1962 – April 10, 2025) was a Cuban-American attorney known for his work on immigration and civil rights issues. His cases were the subject of reports in The New York Times and ABC News and he was a frequent guest on Spanish-language news and opinion programs and local media discussing immigration and other human-rights topics. He also appeared as a legal commentator on CNN.

De Leon was managing partner of the Miami law offices of Chavez & de Leon, P.A, which he co-founded with Fernando Chavez, son of the labor rights activist Cesar Chavez, in 2003. De Leon was cited as a top 100 trial lawyer by the National Trial Lawyers (NTL) organization.

Called a "Civic-Minded Lawyer [Who] Fights for the Rights of Immigrants" by Hispanic Executive magazine, de Leon was once named "Best Promoter of Social Diversity" by Miami New Times and one of "Forty to Watch in the New Century" by The Miami Herald. He often lectured on the subject of immigration, and authored several op-ed pieces on the theme of civil liberties.

He was also a past recipient of the Stanley Milledge Award for lifetime achievements from the Greater Miami chapter of the American Civil Liberties Union (ACLU), of which he was twice president. Of de Leon's first tenure as head of that organization, writer Jacob Bernstein noted in a 2001 article in The Miami New Times that, "His tireless advocacy raised both the profile of his organization, the American Civil Liberties Union, and the importance of the Bill of Rights to heretofore unknown levels of recognition in South Florida." In an article that appeared around the same time in The Miami Herald, Meg Laughlin wrote, "What de Leon is credited with doing in Miami is bringing a very divided community together under the umbrella of individual rights for everyone - whether to the political right or left." In 2019, de Leon was honored with the C. Clyde Atkins Civil Liberties Award by the Greater Miami chapter of the ACLU of Florida, in recognition of his work in the South Florida community.

The youngest child of exiled Cuban parents who came to the U.S. in 1959, de Leon began his law career with the Miami-Dade Public Defender's Office, where he tried cases as an assistant public defender from 1987 to 2001. Prior to forming Chavez & de Leon, he worked in Bogotá, Colombia as an administration-of-justice specialist on a USAID-funded project that assisted the Colombian government on issues relating to criminal defense and trial concerns.

He attended Archbishop Curley, which later became Archbishop Curley-Notre Dame High School, in Miami, and received a cum laude A.B. degree from the University of Miami in 1983, his J.D. from the Georgetown University Law Center in 1986, as well as a master's in international affairs from Columbia University's School of International and Public Affairs in 1992.

De Leon was a board member of the ACLU of Greater Miami, and previously, the Americans for Immigrant Justice (formerly the Florida Immigrant Advocacy Center). He also served on the executive committee of the National Latino Trial Lawyers Association (NLTLA) and the Community Advisory Board for Florida International University College of Law.
