= Wen Junfeng =

Chinese aircraft engine designer (1929–2025)

- 温俊峰
- Born: 20 April 1929; Wuyuan County, Inner Mongolia, China
- Died: 23 April 2025 (aged 96); Yantai, Shandong, China
- Education: Beiyang University; Beihang University; Tsinghua University
- Scientific career
- Fields: Aero-engine
- Workplaces: Beihang University; AVIC Guizhou Engine DesignInstitute; Yantai University

Chinese name
- Simplified Chinese: 温俊峰
- Traditional Chinese: 溫俊峰
Transcriptions
Standard Mandarin
- Hanyu Pinyin: Wēn Jùnfēng

Wen Junfeng (Chinese: 温俊峰; 20 April 1929 – 23 April 2025) was a Chinese aircraft engine designer who was a professor at Yantai University, a former designer of the AVIC Guizhou Engine DesignInstitute, and an academician of the Chinese Academy of Engineering.

== Biography ==
Wen was born in Wuyuan County, Inner Mongolia, on 20 April 1929, while his ancestral home is in Guan County, Shandong. He had five siblings. In 1949, he was accepted to the Mining Department of Beiyang University (now Tianjin University), and six months later he entered the Aeronautics Department of Tsinghua University. Two years later, he transferred to Beihang University. He joined the Chinese Communist Party (CCP) In July 1953.

After graduation in 1956, Wen stayed for teaching. In 1960, he pursued further studies at the Moscow Aviation Academy in the Soviet Union. He returned to China in 1962 and continued to teach at Beihang University. In 1967, he became a designer of the AVIC Guizhou Engine DesignInstitute, he remained in that position until 1987, when he became a professor at Yantai University.

On 23 April 2025, Wen died In Yantai, Shandong, at the age of 96.

== Honours and awards ==
- 1985 State Science and Technology Progress Award (First Class)
- 1990 State Science and Technology Progress Award (First Class)
- 1997 Member of the Chinese Academy of Engineering (CAE)
