= Pere Palau Torres =

Spanish politician (1946–2025)

Member of the Parliament of the Balearic Islands for Ibiza
- In office 3 July 1987 – 31 March 2015

Personal details
- Born: 18 August 1946; Sant Miquel de Balansat, Spain
- Died: 8 April 2025 (aged 78); Sant Antoni de Portmany, Spain
- Political party: PP
- Occupation: Businessman

Pere Palau Torres (18 August 1946 – 8 April 2025) was a Spanish politician. A member of the People's Party, he served in the Parliament of the Balearic Islands from 1987 to 2015. He was president of the Island Council of Eivissa and Formentera from 2003 to 2007.

Palau died in a traffic collision in Sant Antoni de Portmany, on 8 April 2025, at the age of 78.
