= Jaromír Paciorek =

Czech footballer (1979–2025)

Personal information
- Date of birth: 11 July 1979
- Place of birth: Kroměříž, Czechoslovakia
- Date of death: 23 April 2025 (aged 45)
- Place of death: Czech Republic
- Height: 1.82 m (6 ft 0 in)
- Position: Midfielder

Youth career
- 1990–1992: SK Hanácká Slavia Kroměříž
- 1992–1995: FC Svit Zlín
- 1995–1996: Feyenoord

Senior career*
Years	Team	Apps	(Gls)
1996–1997	Feyenoord	0	(0)
1997–1998	SBV Excelsior	10	(1)
1998–2000	Fortuna Sittard	31	(2)
2001–2002	1.FC Brno	5	(0)
2002–2005	SK Hanácká Slavia Kroměříž		
2006–2009	Spartak Hulín	36	(0)
2009–2011	SK Eggenburg		
2011–2012	Tescoma Zlín	9	(0)
- * Club domestic league appearances and goals

Jaromír Paciorek (11 July 1979 – 23 April 2025) was a Czech professional footballer who played as a midfielder.

== Biography ==
Paciorek was born in Kroměříž on 11 July 1979. He began his career in a local club, Hanácká Slavia Kroměříž. Soon his talent – including an overview of the game or speed – was detected by coaches of FC Svit Zlín, where Paciorek was later transferred.

Paciorek played in the Czech under-16 team during 1995 European Under-16 Championship. The championships were successful for him and consequently some famous clubs (e.g. Bayern Munich and Feyenoord Rotterdam) wanted to transfer Paciorek. Eventually Paciorek went to Feyenoord and in his first season he played in the junior team. One year later he was promoted to the senior team, but he did not play any matches there. In 1997, he moved to Excelsior Rotterdam (2nd level). In 1998, he went to Fortuna Sittard, where he played irregularly (31 games over three years); so the club terminated the contract with Paciorek.

In 2001 Paciorek received some offers (among others from Switzerland), but eventually returned to the Czech Republic and signed a contract with 1.FC Brno (1st level). He played only five matches there. At the beginning of 2002–03 season he left the club.

In 2002, he returned to Hanácká Slavia Kroměříž, but he was not a leading player there. At the beginning of 2006 Paciorek went to Spartak Hulín (Czech Fourth Division), where he played in 36 games. In July 2009 he became a player of the Austrian club SK Eggenburg. In June 2011 he moved to FC Tescoma Zlín but retired in January 2012.

Paciorek died on 23 April 2025, at the age of 45.
