= Haakon Stein =

German fencer (1940–2025)

Personal information
- Born: 16 January 1940 Koblenz, Germany
- Died: 21 April 2025 (aged 85) Nassau, Rhineland-Palatinate

Sport
- Sport: Fencing

Haakon Stein (16 January 1940 – 21 April 2025) was a German fencer. He represented the United Team of Germany at the 1964 Summer Olympics in the team épée event. Stein was also the West German épée champion in 1960, and won two international tournaments in Germany in the 1960s.
