= Bernard Rosenthal (scholar) =

American historian (born 1934)

- Born: January 11, 1934; Philadelphia, PA
- Died: April 7, 2025 (aged 91); Haverhill, MA
- Resting place: Boxford Village Cemetery, Boxford, Massachusetts
- Occupations: Scholar; historian

Academic background
- Education: University of Illinois Urbana-Champaign (PhD)

Bernard Rosenthal (January 11, 1934 – April 7, 2025) was an American scholar and historian, professor emeritus of English at Binghamton University, specializing in the history of the Salem witchcraft trials and the writings of Herman Melville. Rosenthal received his Ph.D. from the University of Illinois at Urbana–Champaign in 1968, and was a Fulbright lecturer at Tampere University in Finland in 1996–97.

He has specialized in American culture, literature, and history. He is an internationally known scholar, formerly a Fulbright scholar, and he has written numerous books and articles. In addition to his publications, he has given many talks including at Cornell University, The Modern Language Association, The Melville Society and various others in America. Overseas, he has given talks in London, Edinburgh in Scotland. In Finland, where he was a Fulbright Scholar, he has spoken at Tampere University and Helsinki University. He has also spoken at conferences in Bamberg, Germany and Tallinn, Estonia, as well as elsewhere.

In America he was the key advisor to Lone Wolf Productions in its television show on the Salem Witch Trials and was a participant on the program. He has also appeared on Minnesota Public Radio.

During the child abuse panic beginning in the 90's he explored what connects and what doesn't to the Salem Witch Trials, and he served on the board of directors of the National Center for Reason and Justice, a nonprofit organization for wrongfully accused and imprisoned people. It was in that capacity where he first learned of the wrongful conviction of Joseph Allen and Nancy Smith and then began his exploration of the case, deciding to write a book on it.

== Major works ==
- Injustice in Ohio: The Wrongful Conviction of Allen and Smith (2022, Sunbury Press)
- Records of the Salem Witch-Hunt, Edited by Bernard Rosenthal (2009, Cambridge University Press)
- Herman Melville in Heaven, Edited by Bernard Rosenthal (2009, The Lee Shore Press)
- The Oregon Trail, By Francis Parkman, Edited by Bernard Rosenthal (1996, Oxford University Press)
- Critical Essays on Hawthorne's The House of Seven Gables, Edited by Bernard Rosenthal (1995, G.K. Hall)
- Salem Story: Reading the Salem Witch Trials of 1692, By Bernard Rosenthal (1993, Cambridge University Press)
- Medievalism in American Culture, Edited by Bernard Rosenthal and Paul E. Szarmach (1989, Medieval and Renaissance Texts and Studies)
- Critical Essays on Charles Brockden Brown, Edited by Bernard Rosenthal (1981, G.K. Hall)
- City of Nature: Journeys to Nature in the Age of American Romanticism, By Bernard Rosenthal (1980, University of Delaware Press)
- Race and the American Romantics, Edited by Vincent Freimark and Bernard Rosenthal (1980, University of Delaware Press)
