= Odile de Vasselot =

French resistance fighter (1922–2025)

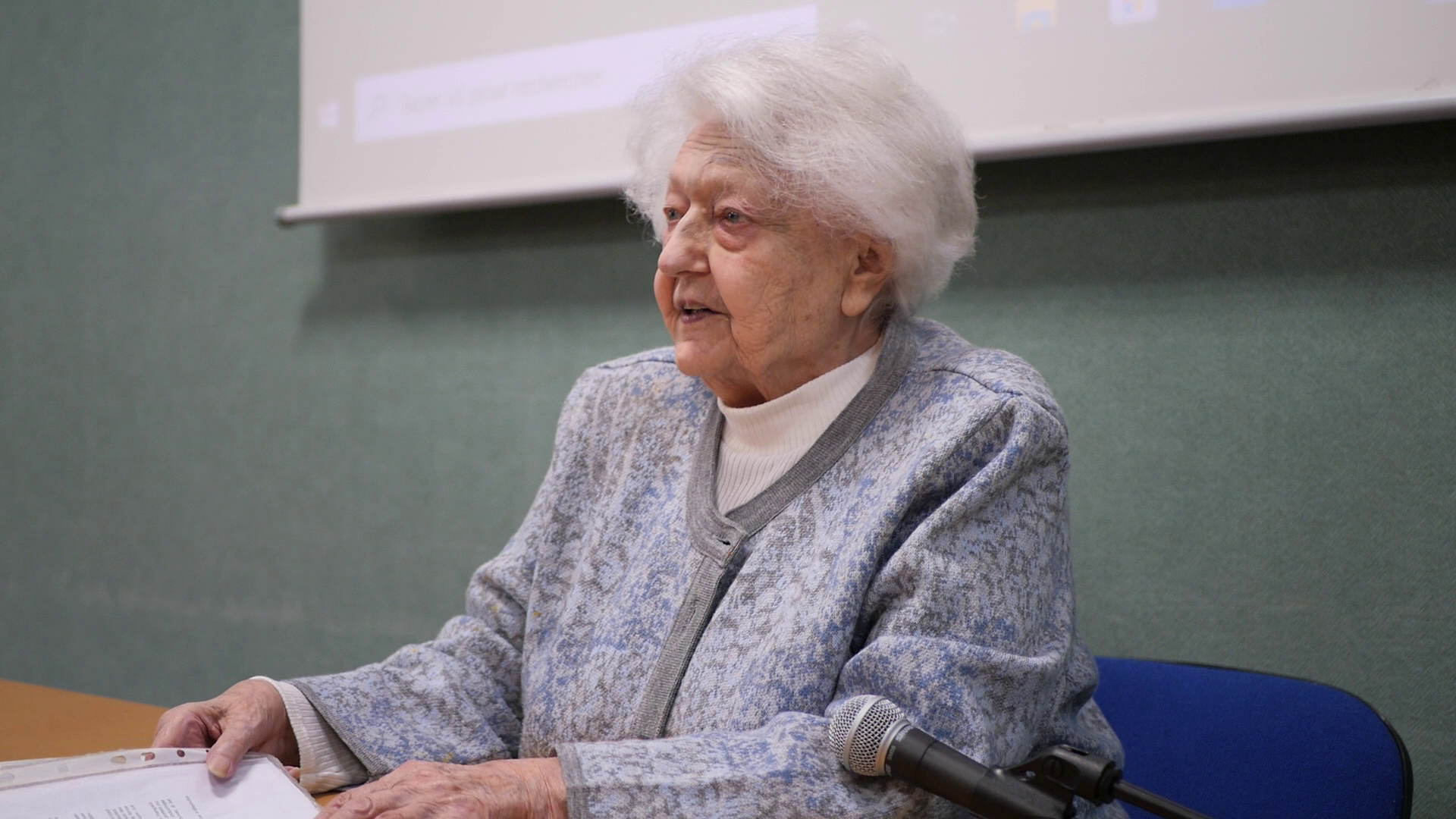
- Born: Odile de Vasselot de Régné; 6 January 1922; Saumur, France
- Died: 21 April 2025 (aged 103)
- Occupation: French Resistance fighter
- Known for: Member of the Zero network and the Comet line

Odile de Vasselot (6 January 1922 – 21 April 2025) was a French resistance fighter.

== Biography ==
Odile de Vasselot de Régné was born on 6 January 1922 in Saumur. She was the daughter and granddaughter of soldiers. After the German invasion of France in 1940 she became a courier in an underground organisation, the Zero network, and carried Resistance communications. When the Zero network was broken she joined the Comet line (le réseau Comète) and helped to smuggle Allied airmen through occupied Europe to Spain.

After the war, de Vasselot earned a degree in history from the Sorbonne and chose a life of religious commitment and education. In 1947, she joined the Saint-François-Xavier apostolic community (Communauté apostolique Saint-François-Xavier).

From 1959 to 1988, she taught in Abidjan, Ivory Coast, where she founded and served as director of the Sainte-Marie secondary school, dedicating three decades to teaching there.

== Death ==
De Vasselot died on 21 April 2025, at the age of 103.

== Honours and decorations ==
- Commander of the Legion of Honour (decree of 2021)
  - Officer (appointed 1971)
- Grand Officer of the National Order of Merit (elevated by decree of 2024)
  - Commander (appointed 1979)
- Croix de guerre 1939–1945
- French Resistance Medal (decree of 1945)
- Knight of the Order of Leopold II (Belgium)
- Croix de guerre (Belgium)
- Medal of Freedom (United States)
- King's Medal for Courage in the Cause of Freedom (United Kingdom)
