= Sinamandla Zondi =

South African soccer player (2002–2025)

Sinamandla Zondi (15 December 2002 – 22 April 2025) was a South African soccer player. He played as a centre back for Durban City that is based in the city of Durban and campaigned in the 2024–25 National First Division.

== Death ==
On 22 April 2025, Zondi collapsed ahead of their league match against Milford F.C. at Chatsworth Stadium and was rushed to hospital, where he died.
