= Ted Hipkiss =

New Zealand cricketer (1947–2025)

Personal information
- Full name: Edwin Hipkiss
- Born: 6 February 1947; Wallasey, England
- Died: 3 April 2025 (aged 78); Whakatāne, New Zealand
- Batting: Right-handed
- Bowling: Right-arm medium-fast

Domestic team information
- Years: Team
- 1964/65–1973/74: Bay of Plenty
- 1966/67: Northern Districts

Career statistics
Competition	First-class
Matches	6
Runs scored	24
Batting average	4.00
100s/50s	0/0
Top score	7*
Balls bowled	678
Wickets	10
Bowling average	29.10
5 wickets in innings	0
10 wickets in match	0
Best bowling	4/39
Catches/stumpings	5/–
- Source: Cricinfo, 14 April 2025

Edwin Hipkiss (6 February 1947 – 3 April 2025) was a New Zealand cricketer.

Born in England but educated at Tauranga Boys' College, Hipkiss played in six first-class matches for Northern Districts during the 1966–67 season. He played age-group cricket for both Northern Districts and Auckland, and in the Hawke Cup for Bay of Plenty.

Hipkiss died in Whakatāne on 3 April 2025, at the age of 78.
