= Russell Doust =

Russell Doust (19 September 1927 – 20 April 2025) was a State Library of New South Wales State Librarian, 1973-1987. He was appointed Deputy in December 1970, and became Acting Principal Librarian before becoming the Principal Librarian on 13 September 1973. He was instrumental in securing support for a major extension to the Library, the Macquarie Street building.

== Early life and education ==
Russell Fletcher Doust was born on 19 September 1927 in Lindfield. The son of Harold Stephen Doust and Dorothy Annie Doust (nee Fletcher). Doust attended Sydney Boys High School and was an organ scholar at the University of Sydney, graduating in 1948. He achieved registration as a librarian in 1953. In 1969 he was awarded a Master of Librarianship by the University of New South Wales for his thesis, "The administration of official archives in N.S.W. 1870–1960".

== Career ==
Russell Doust held a number of positions throughout his library career commencing at the Public Library of New South Wales as a junior library assistant (1944-1949) before moving on to the Newcastle Teachers College (1950-1951), Balmain Teachers College (1952-1958), Alexander Mackie Teachers College (1958-1960) and returning to the Public Library of New South Wales in 1960, Doust was the senior archivist (1962-1970), deputy principal librarian (1970-1973) and Principal Librarian, later known as State Librarian of New South Wales, from 1973 until his retirement in 1987. An active member of the professional association, Doust was made a foundation Fellow of the Library Association of Australia in 1963, recognising his contribution to library services.

In 1973 when he became Principal Librarian, Doust re-established the Mitchell Librarian role as a separate position reversing the decision of the previous Principal Librarian who had absorbed both the Deputy Principal Librarian and Mitchell Librarian roles into the Principal Librarian position. Doust led the amalgamation of the two statutory bodies previously responsible for the State Library and free public libraries into a single Library Council of New South Wales in 1975.

Russell Doust wrote to Neville Wran, Premier of New South Wales, in June 1978 suggesting that a new wing for the State Library would be an appropriate way to commemorate the Bicentenary of European settlement in Australia. On 19 September 1980, Jill Hickson Wran, opened Australian Library Week in the State Library announcing the Government’s intention to “build a new Library, as part of the commemoration of Australia’s Bicentenary in 1988”. This heralded the construction of the Macquarie Street wing of the State Library of NSW. Work began on the Macquarie Street wing in 1983. Doust retired in 1987 and the Macquarie Street wing was officially opened in 1988 by Her Majesty Queen Elizabeth II.
