= Cecilia Villalobos =

Chilean politician (1962–2025)

Governor of Colchagua Province
- In office 2004 – 11 March 2006
- Preceded by: Juan Paulo Molina
- Succeeded by: Marco Solorza Moreno

Personal details
- Born: Cecilia del Pilar Villalobos Cartes; 1962
- Died: 6 April 2025 (aged 62–63)
- Party: PPD
- Education: University of Concepción
- Occupation: Teacher

Cecilia del Pilar Villalobos Cartes (1962 – 6 April 2025) was a Chilean politician. A member of the Party for Democracy, she served as governor of Colchagua Province from 2004 to 2006. Villalobos died on 6 April 2025.
