= Michelangelo Riccardo Maria Tiribilli =

Italian Catholic priest (1937–2025)

Michelangelo Riccardo Maria Tiribilli O.S.B.
- Abbott of Monte Oliveto Maggiore
- Church: Catholic Church
- See: Territorial Abbey of Monte Oliveto Maggiore
- In office: 16 October 1992 – 21 October 2010
- Predecessor: Maurizio Benvenuto Maria Contorni
- Successor: Diego Maria Rosa

Orders
- Ordination: 2 July 1961

Personal details
- Born: 18 March 1937
- Died: 11 April 2025 (aged 88)

Michelangelo Riccardo Maria Tiribilli (18 March 1937 – 11 April 2025) was an Italian Roman Catholic priest and abbot of Territorial Abbey of Monte Oliveto Maggiore between 1992 and 2010.

== Biography ==
Tiribilli joined the Olivetan order, completed his novitiate at the Abbey of San Fruttuoso and was ordained a priest on 2 July 1961 after completing his theological training. He was involved in pastoral work in various monasteries and parishes, including as parish priest in the parish of Bernardo Tolomei in Siena.

Tiribilli was elected abbot of the territorial abbey of Monte Oliveto Maggiore in Chiusure near Asciano on 16 October 1992 and was thus also abbot general of the Olivetan Benedictine Congregation worldwide from 1992 to 2010. He was also a member of the Italian Bishops' Conference (CEI).

On 21 October 2010, Pope Benedict XVI accepted his resignation due to his age.

Tiribilli died on 11 April 2025 after a long illness in an abbey of the order in Seregno near Milan, where he had dedicated himself to the task of reviving the abbey. He was 88.
