= Dimitris Vounatsos =

Greek politician (1943–2025)

- Δημήτρης Βουνάτσος

Member of the Hellenic Parliament for Lesbos
- In office 29 May 1991 – 24 August 1996
- In office 18 October 1981 – 12 March 1990

Personal details
- Born: 1943; Plomari, German-occupied Greece
- Died: 7 April 2025 (aged 81–82); Mytilene, Greece
- Political party: PASOK
- Education: Aristotle University of Thessaloniki
- Occupation: Lawyer

Dimitris Vounatsos (Greek: Δημήτρης Βουνάτσος; 1943 – 7 April 2025) was a Greek politician. A member of PASOK, he served in the Hellenic Parliament from 1981 to 1990 and again from 1991 to 1996.

Vounatsos died in Mytilene on 7 April 2025.
