= George Lee (dancer) =

Asian American ballet dancer (1935–2025)

- Born: February 18, 1935; British Hong Kong
- Died: April 20, 2025 (aged 90); Las Vegas, Nevada, U.S.
- Occupation: ballet dancer
- Years active: 1950s–1980
- Career
- Former groups: New York City Ballet

George R. Lee (February 18, 1935 – April 20, 2025) was a Chinese-American ballet dancer who was New York City Ballet's first Asian dancer.

== Early life ==
Lee was born on February 18, 1935 in Hong Kong as George Li. Lee's mother, Stanislawa, was of Polish descent and was a ballet dancer. His mother trained him in the Russian school of ballet. Lee's father, Alexander, was of Chinese descent and worked as an acrobat. Lee's father died in 1945 in a car crash. Around 1942, he moved to Shanghai, China when he was around six years old and worked as a dancer. In 1949, Lee and his mother fled Shanghai to the Philippines and lived in a United Nations' refugee camp in Tubabao. He and his mother spent two years in a refugee camp in the Philippines. In 1951, Lee arrived in the United States of America with his mother. His mother originally tried to have them immigrate to Australia but due to anti-Chinese immigration laws could not.

In 1959, Lee became a United States citizen and changed the spelling of his last name from Li to Lee.

== Career ==
Once in the United States, Lee attended the School of American Ballet on a full scholarship. Due to his talent, he was tutored and brought on tour by the principal dancer at the New York City Ballet André Eglevsky. In 1954, Lee danced in George Balanchine's The Nutcracker. He danced in the “Chinese Tea” dance. In 1958, Gene Kelly cast Lee for Richard Rodgers and Oscar Hammerstein's original production of Flower Drum Song.

Lee went on tour for dancing and performed at the Riviera and El Rancho Hotel and Casino (formerly known as the Thunderbird). While he was still performing in Las Vegas, Nevada, Lee attended dealing school during the day to learn how to deal cards. In 1980, Lee retired from ballet and worked as a blackjack dealer in Las Vegas, Nevada for nearly 40 years.

In 2024, Lee is featured in the journalist and filmmaker Jennifer Lin’s documentary Ten Times Better. The title of Ten Times Better was inspired by what Lee's mother had said to him when he moved to the United States, which was that if "you are going to America and it's all white people. You gotta be ten times better. Remember that, ten times better." Ten Times Better premiered on February 10, 2024 as part of the Dance on Camera Festival at the Lincoln Center.

== Death ==
Lee died in Las Vegas, Nevada on April 20, 2025, at the age of 90.
