= Frédéric Randriamamonjy =

Malagasy diplomat and politician (1932–2025)

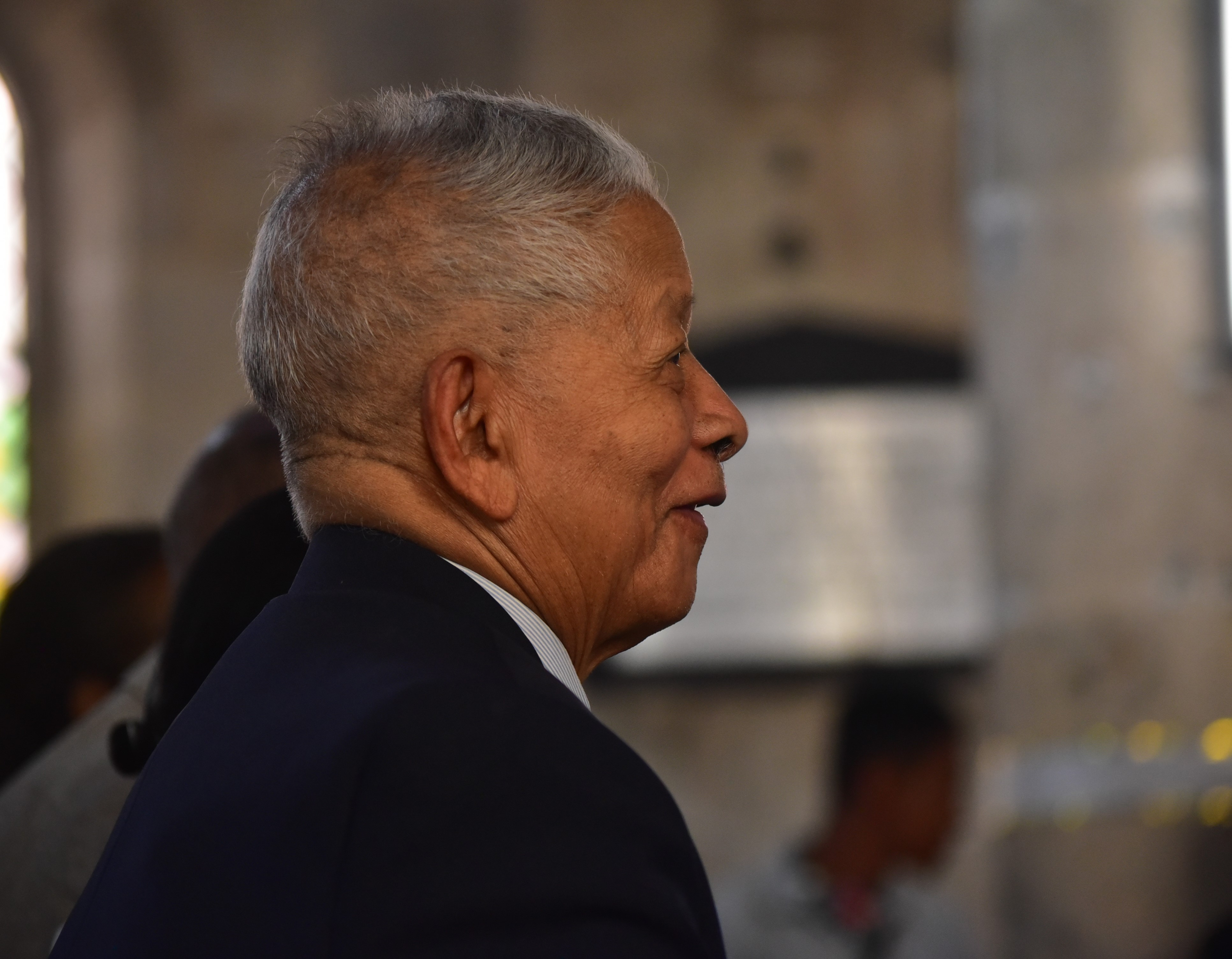
- Randriamamonjy in 2025

Member of the National Assembly of Madagascar
- In office 1993–1998

Personal details
- Born: 25 May 1932 Mandialaza, French Madagascar
- Died: 9 April 2025 (aged 92) Isoraka, Antananarivo, Madagascar
- Education: Collège Cévenol; University of Montpellier; University of Burgundy; Durham University; University of Rhode Island; University of Copenhagen
- Occupation: Diplomat; Writer

Frédéric Randriamamonjy (25 May 1932 – 9 April 2025) was a Malagasy diplomat, writer and politician. He was a member of the Malagasy Academy and served as an ambassador to multiple countries.

== Biography ==
=== Early life and education ===
Born in Mandialaza on 25 May 1932, Randriamamonjy was the son of pastor Randriamaro and writer Ramavo. His schooling was interrupted by the Malagasy Uprising, but he was able to continue his education in various Protestant schools. He then earned a bachelor's degree in experimental sciences from the Collège Cévenol before earning a degree in natural sciences from the University of Montpellier in 1957. He defended his doctoral thesis in entomology from the University of Burgundy in 1963. He earned a Master of Science in ecology from the University of Durham and earned a certificate in field biology from Rhode Island University. He also enriched his teaching skills at the University of Copenhagen. On 17 August 1960, he married writer Esther Randriamamonjy.

=== Politics and diplomacy ===
After working as a schoolteacher and a pastor, Randiamamonjy was ambassador of Madagascar to the Soviet Union from 1976 to 1986 along with several other Eastern Bloc countries, such as East Germany, Hungary, Czechoslovakia, Poland, and Bulgaria. Upon his return to Madagascar, he was a member of the Haute Autorité de l’État from 1992 to 1993 and served in the National Assembly from 1993 to 1998.

=== Death ===
Randriamamonjy died on 9 April 2025, at the age of 92.

== Works ==
- Contribution à la connaissance de Deborrea malagassa Heyl (1961)
- Etude du squelette et de la musculature céphalique de Phthorimaea heliopa Low (1963)
- Plantes à tubercules (1968)
- Études sur l'hivernage des moustiques (1967)
- Noms d'animaux et de plantes courants. Manuel d'identification pratique des espèces animales et végétales courantes (1977)
- Histoire régionale de Madagascar (2001)
- Histoire de Madagascar 1895 – 2002 (2006)
- Histoire des régions de Madagascar des origines à la fin du XIXe siècle (2008)
