= Thomas W. Hoover =

American politician (1932–2025)

Member of the New Mexico House of Representatives
- In office 1964–1974

Member of the Albuquerque City Council
- In office 1974–1987

Personal details
- Born: Thomas Warren Hoover; June 25, 1932 Washington, Iowa, U.S.
- Died: April 5, 2025 (aged 92) Albuquerque, New Mexico, U.S.
- Party: Republican
- Spouse: Bettye Hoover
- Education: Iowa State University

Thomas Warren Hoover (June 25, 1932 – April 5, 2025) was an American politician. A member of the Republican Party, he served in the New Mexico House of Representatives from 1964 to 1974 and in the Albuquerque City Council from 1974 to 1987.

== Life and career ==
Hoover was born in Washington, Iowa, the son of Leo and Rhea Hoover. He served in the armed forces during the Korean War, which after his discharge, he attended Iowa State University, earning his bachelor's degree in mechanical engineering.

Hoover served in the New Mexico House of Representatives from 1964 to 1974. After his service in the House, he then served in the Albuquerque City Council from 1974 to 1987.

== Death ==
Hoover died on April 5, 2025, in Albuquerque, New Mexico, at the age of 92.
