= Nicola Rivelli =

Italian politician (1955–2025)

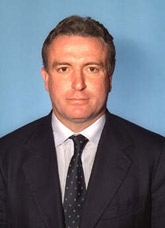
Nicola Rivelli

Nicola Rivelli (2 December 1955 – 24 April 2025) was an Italian politician who served as a Deputy. He died on 24 April 2025, at the age of 69.
