= Steven Gitomer =

American electrical engineer

- Born: Steven Joel Gitomer; 1942
- Died: April 25, 2025 (aged 82); Santa Fe, New Mexico, U.S.
- Education: Johns Hopkins University; University of Wisconsin–Madison
- Occupation: Electrical engineer

Steven Joel Gitomer (1942 – April 25, 2025) was an American electrical engineer.

== Life and career ==
Gitomer was born in 1942. He attended Johns Hopkins University, earning his BEE degree in 1964 and his MS degree in electrical engineering in 1966. He also attended the University of Wisconsin–Madison, earning his PhD degree in 1969. After graduating, he served as an assistant professor in the department of electrical engineering at the University of Pennsylvania.

Gitomer worked at the Los Alamos National Laboratory until 2005, and from 1984 to 2024, he served as editor-in-chief of IEEE Transactions on Plasma Science. During his years as editor-in-chief, in 1992, he was named a fellow of the Institute of Electrical and Electronics Engineers, "for leadership in the field of plasma science and the modeling of laser-produced plasmas".

== Death ==
Gitomer died on April 25, 2025, in Santa Fe, New Mexico, at the age of 82.
