= Paul Rinaldi =

American visual artist

Paul Rinaldi was a visual artist whose work has been included in numerous exhibitions in the United States, the Middle East, and Europe. From 1991 through 1998 he lived in Egypt and taught art at the American University in Cairo. In 1986, Rinaldi was awarded the Silvermine Guild Prize for Painting in the Art of the Northeast USA exhibition juried by Linda Shearer, Curator of Contemporary Art at New York's Museum of Modern Art. He died April 18, 2025.

== Early life and education ==
Rinaldi attended the University of Massachusetts, Amherst. He received his Master of Fine Arts degree in 1988 from the Brooklyn College of the City University of New York.
