= National Opera of New Zealand =

National opera company in New Zealand (1978–1982)

- Formation: 1978
- Dissolved: 1982
- Type: Opera company
- Location: Auckland, New Zealand

The National Opera of New Zealand was a short-lived opera company based in Auckland, New Zealand, established with the support of the QE II Arts Council after the collapse of the New Zealand Opera Company in 1971. In 1982 it produced Kurt Weill's Rise and Fall of the City of Mahagonny and Benjamin Britten’s The Turn of the Screw. Both were artistically successful but financially insufficient for the company to continue. It was disbanded soon after.
