= Angela Francese =

Italian politician (1950–2025)

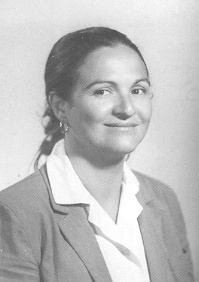
Image of Angela Francese

Angela Francese (15 September 1950 – 29 April 2025) was an Italian politician who served as a Deputy. She died on 29 April 2025, at the age of 74.
