= Riet Roosen-van Pelt =

Dutch politician (1934–2025)

Member of the House of Representatives of the Netherlands
- In office 24 June 1986 – 16 May 1994

Personal details
- Born: Maria Jacoba Josephina Roosen-van Pelt; 1 March 1934 Tilburg, Netherlands
- Died: 11 April 2025 (aged 91) Schaijk, Netherlands
- Party: CDA
- Occupation: Religious activist

Maria Jacoba Josephina "Riet" Roosen-van Pelt (1 March 1934 – 11 April 2025) was a Dutch politician. A member of the Christian Democratic Appeal, she served in the House of Representatives from 1986 to 1994.

Roosen-van Pelt died in Schaijk on 11 April 2025, at the age of 91.
