= Nahid Rachlin =

Iranian-American novelist (1939–2025)

Nahid Rachlin (6 June 1939 – 30 April 2025) was an Iranian-American novelist and short story writer. She has been called "perhaps the most published Iranian author in the United States".

== Life ==
Nahid Rachlin was born 6 June 1939, in Abadan, Iran, the eighth of ten children (2 of whom had died before her birth) to Manoochehr and Mohtaram Bozorgmehri. Brought up by her mother's older sister from when she was not yet one until she was nine years old when her father who had been a circuit judge resigned and started a private practice. She then lived with her parents, who were emotionally distant, under the shadow of restrictive gender expectations. Her closest family relationship was with an older sister, Pari. Pari underwent arranged marriage to a physically abusive older man, and then lost access to her son after she sued for divorce. Pari remarried, but suffered episodes of mental breakdown for which she was institutionalised, and died young after a home accident.

Rachlin emigrated to the United States when she was 17, gaining a BA at Lindenwood College. In 1964, she married Howard Rachlin, a psychology professor, and in 1969 became a naturalized US citizen. They had a daughter named Leila. In the early 1970s she pursued graduate study in creative writing, writing short stories for a class with Richard Humphries at Columbia University, and for a class with Donald Barthelme at City College of New York. These stories won her the Stegner Fellowship at Stanford University. In 1976 Rachlin returned to Iran for the first time in twelve years, drawing on the experience for her debut novel Foreigner.

Rachlin died from a stroke at a hospital in Manhattan, New York, on 30 April 2025, at the age of 85.

== Works ==
- Foreigner. New York: Norton, 1978.
- Married to a stranger. New York : Dutton, 1983.
- Veils: short stories. San Francisco: City Lights Books, 1992.
- The heart's desire: a novel. San Francisco: City Lights Books, 1995.
- Jumping over fire. San Francisco: City Lights Books, 2005.
- Persian girls: a memoir. New York: Jeremy P. Tarcher, 2006.
- A Way Home: stories. Edmonds, Washington: Ravenna Press, 2018.
