= Ladislas Orsy =

Hungarian-American Jesuit theologian (1921–2025)

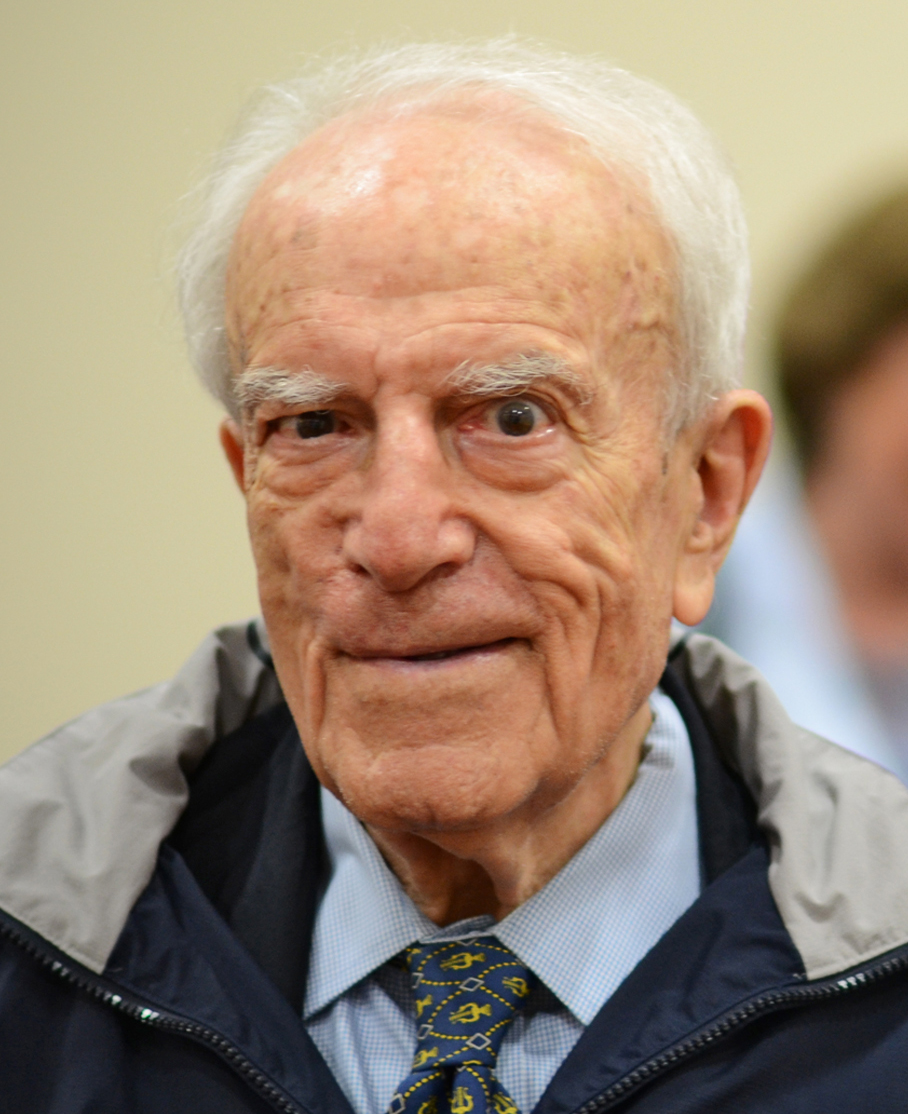
Orsy in 2012

Ladislas Orsy, S.J (Hungarian: Őrsy László; July 30, 1921 – April 3, 2025) was a Hungarian-American Jesuit priest and noted canonical theologian.

== Early life ==
Orsy was born on July 30, 1921, in Pusztaegres, Fejér County, Hungary. He completed his secondary education at the Cistercian Gymnasium in Székesfehérvár. After graduating from high school, he studied law at the Pázmány Péter Catholic University in Budapest, from which he joined the Society of Jesus in 1943. He completed his novitiate in Manréza, Zugliget, and then began his philosophical studies in Szeged.

== Education ==
Due to the growing communist influence in his country, Orsy fled abroad in 1946. He obtained a licentiate in philosophy at the Gregorian University in Rome in 1948. There he then began his study of theology, which he completed between 1950–52 at the Jesuit College of the Catholic University of Leuven in 1952. In the meantime, he was ordained a priest in 1951.

Five years later Orsy obtained his doctorate in Canon Law at the Gregorian University. In 1960 he earned an MA degree in civil law from the Honours School of Jurisprudence at Oxford University. In 1953, he completed his period of tertianship at Saint Asaph, Wales. The following year he was appointed as a pastor in London. He then obtained a doctorate in canon law from the Pontifical Gregorian University (1954–57). He supplemented this with a master's degree in civil law at Oxford (Honour School of Jurisprudence, 1957–60).

== Educator ==
Orsy went on to teach Catholic Canon Law and Roman civil law at various universities around the world, initially at Fordham University in the Bronx, New York, and later at Georgetown University in Washington, D.C., from which he retired at the age of 97. He also lectured at the Gregorian University.

== Writing career ==
Orsy wrote hundreds of journal articles and nine books on theology and canon law. His books include Marriage in Canon Law (1986), The Church: Learning and Teaching (1987), Theology and Canon Law: New Horizons for Legislation and Interpretation (1992).

== Teaching career ==
Orsy was at one time a professor of Canon Law at The Catholic University of America School of Canon Law. He taught Canon Law at the Gregorian University in Rome, Fordham University, the University of Fribourg, Switzerland, Saint Paul University, Ottawa, Canada, and the Georgetown University Law Center. He was a regular visitor at the Georgetown University Law Center where he taught Roman Law, Philosophy of Law, Canon Law, and Great Philosophers on Law.

In 1999, Orsy dialogued with then-Cardinal Joseph Ratzinger about the Apostolic letter Ad Tuendam Fidem.

== Death ==
Orsy died on April 3, 2025, at the age of 103.
