= Feng Shuyu =

Chinese engineer

- 冯叔瑜
- Born: 20 June 1924; Linshui County, Sichuan, China
- Died: 14 April 2025 (aged 100); Beijing, China
- Education: National Chiao Tung University
- Scientific career
- Fields: Blasting science
- Workplaces: China Academy of Railway Sciences

Chinese name
- Simplified Chinese: 冯叔瑜
- Traditional Chinese: 馮叔瑜
Transcriptions
Standard Mandarin
- Hanyu Pinyin: Féng Shūyú

Feng Shuyu (Chinese: 冯叔瑜; 20 June 1924 – 14 April 2025) was a Chinese blasting engineer, and an academician of the Chinese Academy of Engineering.

== Biography ==
Feng was born in Linshui County, Sichuan, on 20 June 1924, to Feng Shunqin (冯舜钦), a teacher, and Li Chongjian (李崇俭), a farmer. He had four siblings. He attended Linshui County No. 1 Primary School, Linshui County Middle School, Dazhu Normal School, and the Department of Mechanical Engineering, Central University of Technology. In 1949, he was accepted to the Department of Civil Engineering, National Chiao Tung University.

After university in 1949, Feng was assigned as a construction worker to the Southwest Railway Engineering Bureau. In 1955, he matriculated at the Leningrad Railway Transport Engineering Institute on Chinese government scholarship, earning a vice-doctorate in 1955. He returned to China in December 1955 and became an engineer of the Infrastructure Department, Engineering Bureau of the Ministry of Railways. In 1958, he was transferred to the China Academy of Railway Sciences, where he was promoted to associate research fellow in 1963 and to research fellow in 1979.

On 14 April 2025, Feng died in Beijing at the age of 100.

== Honours and awards ==
- 1985 State Science and Technology Progress Award (Special Prize) for new technology for constructing the Chengdu-Kunming Railway in complex geological and steep mountainous areas
- 1995 Member of the Chinese Academy of Engineering (CAE)
