= Rémy Pautrat =

French civil servant (1940–2025)

Prefect of Nord
- In office 6 May 1999 – July 2004
- Preceded by: Alain Ohrel
- Succeeded by: Jean Aribaud

Prefect of Calvados
- In office 10 April 1996 – 6 May 1999
- Preceded by: Roger Gros
- Succeeded by: Hubert Fournier

Prefect of Essonne
- In office 10 July 1991 – 3 March 1994
- Preceded by: Jean-Louis Dufeigneux
- Succeeded by: François Leblond

Director of the Direction de la surveillance du territoire
- In office 1 August 1985 – 9 April 1986
- Preceded by: Yves Bonnet
- Succeeded by: Bernard Gérard

Prefect of Hautes-Alpes
- In office 16 February 1984 – 6 August 1985
- Preceded by: Michel Blangy
- Succeeded by: Lucien Kalfon

Personal details
- Born: 13 February 1940 Nevers, France
- Died: 6 April 2025 (aged 85) Versailles, France
- Education: École nationale d'administration
- Occupation: Civil servant

Rémy Pautrat (13 February 1940 – 6 April 2025) was a French civil servant. He served as Director of the Direction de la surveillance du territoire from 1985 to 1986 and was security advisor to Prime Minister Michel Rocard from 1988 to 1991. He also served as Deputy Secretary-General of the Secretariat-General for National Defence and Security (SGDN) from 1994 to 1996.

== Life and career ==
Born in Nevers on 13 February 1940, Pautrat's father worked for SNCF. After attending secondary school in his hometown, he studied law in Clermont-Ferrand and Paris. From 1966 to 1969, he worked for the Ministry of Finance of Algeria. In 1974, he graduated from the École nationale d'administration. He served as a sub-prefect in Manche and Yonne. On 16 February 1984, he was named Prefect of Hautes-Alpes. He served in this role until he was appointed Director of the Direction de la surveillance du territoire on 1 August 1986, a position he held until 9 April 1986. In 1989, he helped advance reform to the Comité interministériel du renseignement.

In 1994, Pautrat was named Deputy Secretary-General of the SGDN and established a committee for "competitiveness and economic security". The committee set the groundwork for the Haut responsable chargé de l'intelligence économique, created in 2003. In 2007, journalist Nicole Chevillard testified that Pautrat alleged Algerian Army support for Djamel Zitouni, perpetrator of the 1995 France bombings. Five years prior, Pautrat had made similar allegations in an interview on Canal+.

Pautrat served as Prefect of Calvados from 1996 to 1999 and was subsequently Prefect of Nord from 1999 to 2004. During this time, he organized a regional economic intelligence conference in Caen on 29 May 1997. On 10 July 1998, he was a signatory of a convention "for the development of economic intelligence and the internationalization of small and medium enterprises in Lower Normandy" alongside President of the Regional Council of Lower Normandy René Garrec. As Prefect of Nord, he created the Comité de développement de l'intelligence économique et stratégique (CDIES) with business leaders from the region and the Lille 2 University of Health and Law. The CDIES employed 80 people in 2009. In 2002, he was appointed chairman of the board of directors of the Agence de l'eau Artois-Picardie. In 2004, he was named executive vice-president of the Agence pour la diffusion de l'information technologique.

Upon his retirement, Pautrat sat on the Paris committee on video surveillance. He also helped ensure the security of the 2011 French Socialist Party presidential primary. In 2005, he had been a sponsor of the Economic Warfare School.

Pautrat died in Versailles on 6 April 2025, at the age of 85.

== Distinctions ==
- Officer of the Legion of Honour (1994)
- Commander of the Ordre national du Mérite (1998)
