= Sutton Marks =

American politician (1928–2025)

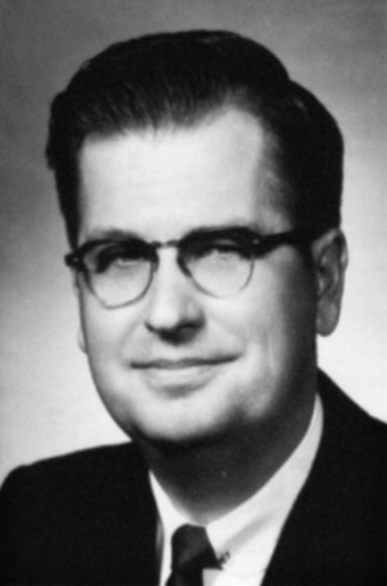

Member of the Mississippi House of Representatives
- In office 1960–1968

Personal details
- Born: Gordon Sutton Marks Jr. July 11, 1928 Jackson, Mississippi, U.S.
- Died: April 8, 2025 (aged 96) Madison, Mississippi, U.S.
- Party: Democratic; Republican
- Spouse: Helen Murphy

Gordon Sutton Marks Jr. (July 11, 1928 – April 8, 2025) was an American politician. He served as a member of the Mississippi House of Representatives.

== Life and career ==
Marks was born in Jackson, Mississippi, on July 11, 1928. He was a business man, president of the Gordon Marks Advertising Agency and chairman of the Jackson church board.

Marks served in the Mississippi House of Representatives from 1960 to 1968. Marks died in Madison, Mississippi, on April 8, 2025, at the age of 96.
