= Ilyas Halil =

Canadian banker (1930–2025)

- Born: Ilyas Halil; 1 May 1930; Adana, Turkey
- Died: 23 April 2025 (aged 94); Montreal, Canada
- Education: Tarsus American College
- Occupations: Writer, poet, banker

Ilyas Halil (1 May 1930 – 23 April 2025) was a Canadian banker, author, and poet who served as a senior manager for the Abu Dhabi Investment Authority from 1979 until 2000.

== Early life ==
İlyas Halil was born on 1 May 1930, in Adana, Turkey, into a modest Greek Catholic family of Lebanese and Syrian descent. He had a younger sister, Liliane, and a younger brother, Charles. Halil was raised in Mersin, within the region’s Christian minority community, and later attended Tarsus American College, where he learned English.

As a child, he suffered a serious fall that left his left arm partially paralyzed for the rest of his life. His father was frequently absent, and following the death of his mother when he was 17, Halil took on the responsibility of caring for his younger siblings. In difficult financial circumstances, he worked a series of small jobs—including road construction—to support his family.

== Poetry and art ==
Halil was active in Turkish literary and artistic circles, and maintained close friendships with several prominent figures, most notably the painter Nuri Abaç, whose artwork would later be featured on the covers of Halil’s published works. He contributed short stories and poetry to various local newspapers and literary journals, gaining recognition for his distinct narrative voice and satirical tone.

His early publications include:

- Hal ve Hayal (Fact and Fantasy, 1950)
- Mürdüm Dalı (Damson Branch, 1953)
- Yalandır Herhalde (It’s a Lie, Probably, 1959)

After moving to Canada in 1964, Halil took a break from publishing. He resumed his literary output in 1983, releasing a number of poetry and short story collections over the following decades, including:

- Doyumsuz Göz (Discontented Eye, 1983)
- Çıplak Yula (Naked Yula, 1985)
- İt Avı (Dog Hunt, 1987)
- Boyansın Ramazan (Shoeshine Ramadan, 1989)
- İskambil Evler (House of Cards, 1991)
- Kiralık Mabet (Temple for Rent, 1993)
- Sarhoş Çimenler (The Drunken Grass, 1995)
- Gâvur Memur Aranıyor (Wanted: Infidel Employees, 1999)
- Körler Bahçesi (Garden for the Blind, 2004)
- Agap Çiçeği (The Agape Flower, 2006)
- Gâvur Aşevi (Infidel’s Restaurant, 2007)
- Chagall Yıllarım (My Chagall Years, 2008)
- Plaza Dona Elvira (Plaza Dona Elvira, 2009)
- Ebel’in Duası (Ebel’s Prayer, 2011)
- Salkımlar Ülkesi Salkımya (Two Grapes on a Cluster, 2013)

Many of İlyas Halil’s works have been translated from Turkish into English, French, Arabic, and Greek, allowing his literary contributions to reach an international audience.

His poetry volume It Takes Sixty-Five Years of Waiting was translated into Greek by former Greek ambassador to the United Arab Emirates, Dimitris Iliopoulos, and published by the European Art Center in Athens in 2000. Iliopoulos also translated two additional volumes, Four Droplets of Spring Rain and Streak of Salt, into Greek, which were likewise published by the European Art Center in 2005.

It Takes Sixty-Five Years of Waiting and Four Droplets of Spring Rain, originally published by Toplum Yayınları in Ankara in 1998 and 2000, were later combined and published in English by Veniard Press in Montreal, Canada. The Arabic and French translations of It Takes Sixty-Five Years of Waiting were released in 2002. A selection of seventeen poems from this collection was translated into Arabic by Abdel Mecit, a Saudi Arabian poet.

A collection of Halil’s short stories was translated into Arabic by Michel Naggar and published under the title Engineer Wanted by Grey Press. The title story was also translated into Chinese and featured in the periodical English Saloon. Additionally, one of his poems was adapted into a musical composition in Ukraine.

Several of Halil’s short story collections have been translated into English and published by Southmoor Studios, including:

- Unregulated Chicken Butts and Other Stories
- Temple for Rent (Kiralık Mabet)
- Wanted: Infidel Employees (Gâvur Memur Aranıyor)
- Shoeshine Ramadan (Boyansın Ramazan)
- Drunken Grass (Sarhoş Çimenler)
- House of Cards (İskambil Evler)
- Dog Hunt (İt Avı)
- Naked Yula (Çıplak Yula)

Additionally, selected stories from Discontented Eye and Naked Yula were published by the University of Utah Press.

Poetry and art remained central to his life until his passing. His extensive art collection grew to such an extent that his wife, Irene, had to store paintings behind window curtains to accommodate the volume.

== Banking career ==
İlyas Halil immigrated to Winnipeg, Canada, in 1964 with his wife and first daughter to accept a junior position at the Bank of Montreal, earning 200 Canadian dollars per month. The harsh Canadian winters initially presented a significant adjustment for Halil. In 1967, following the birth of his second daughter, the family moved to Montreal after Halil received a promotion within the Bank of Montreal.

In 1979, three years after its establishment, Halil joined the Abu Dhabi Investment Authority (ADIA), a sovereign wealth fund owned by the Emirate of Abu Dhabi. Over time, he advanced within the organization to become a senior manager, responsible for managing and investing the emirate’s surplus oil revenues on behalf of the government of Abu Dhabi. Halil became known for his investment strategies, which attracted attention from financial experts and advisors worldwide. He retired in 2000 at the age of 70.

== Personal life ==
Upon his retirement, Halil left the UAE and returned to Montreal.

İlyas Halil was married to Irene Kosker, whom he met in Mersin. Kosker came from an Armenian family and was educated at a French Catholic boarding school in Lebanon. Together, İlyas and Irene had four daughters.

İlyas Halil’s family name was originally spelled “Khalil,” reflecting their Lebanese heritage. Following Atatürk’s language and cultural reforms, which encouraged the adoption of Turkish spelling and pronunciation, the name was adapted to “Halil.” This change helped integrate the family more smoothly into Turkish society and reduced the risk of discrimination, reflecting the broader efforts to foster national unity and cohesion during that period.

Many of his extended family members and descendants went on to become doctors, lawyers, entrepreneurs, authors, United Nations officials, academics, and engineers.

Halil died on 23 April 2025 in Westmount, Montreal, surrounded by his extended family and loved ones.

== Honors & awards ==
Halil is featured in the official archive of the Turkish Ministry of Culture and Tourism, a distinction that affirms his recognized role in Turkeys modern literacy tradition.

In June 2012, the Akdeniz Municipal Council unanimously approved renaming 4302 Street in Mersin’s Kiremithane neighborhood after İlyas Halil, in recognition of his contributions as a poet and writer whose childhood and youth were rooted in the city. Local efforts to honor him originally proposed naming a major avenue, but when that proved unworkable, a street was dedicated instead. The decision received backing across four political parties, reflecting broad civic support. In October 2013, Halil returned to Mersin with his eldest daughter and childhood best friend doctor Gabriel Muruve to visit the street bearing his name. He was hosted by then-mayor Fazıl Türk and presented with a plaque along with the official municipal resolution. The event underscored his enduring resonance in the city’s cultural memory. A commemorative plaque now adorns the street, referencing a line from Halil’s own poetry, symbolically linking his literary identity to the very fabric of Mersin’s cityscape.

The İlyas Halil Öykü Ödülü (Ilyas Halil Short Story Award) is an annual literary award established by the Mersin Art & Literature Association in Turkey, designed to honor the legacy of the poet and writer İlyas Halil, and to encourage new creative works in Turkish literature.
