= Fred Macquire =

Australian rules footballer

Personal information
- Full name: Frederick Thomas Macquire
- Born: 21 November 1936
- Died: 9 April 2025 (aged 88)
- Original team: North Colts
- Height: 178 cm (5 ft 10 in)
- Weight: 74 kg (163 lb)

Playing career^{1}
Years	Club	Games (Goals)
1956–1959	North Melbourne	15 (2)
- ^{1} Playing statistics correct to the end of 1959.

Frederick Thomas Macquire (21 November 1936 – 9 April 2025, also (mistakenly) referred to as MacGuire or MacQuire) was an Australian rules footballer who played with North Melbourne in the Victorian Football League (VFL).

== Family ==
The son of Frederick James Charles Macquire (1900–1963), and Ellen Cecilia Macquire (1900–1945), née Jenkins, Frederick Macquire was born 21 November 1936.

In business with his father, Macquire was both a professional fishmonger and a professional bookmaker – as a bookmaker, his father was widely known as "Fishy" Macquire.

== Football ==
External image
- Photograph of Macquire's bagman at the Victorian Spring Racing Carnival (1980s). Source: State Library of Victoria Collection

At 16, he was playing at centre half-forward for North-West in the semi-finals of Melbourne's Sunday Amateur Football League (SAFL): "a high-flyer that has bundles of pace, [Macquire] can be a match-winner. … If [Collingwood's half-back players] can hold this brilliant footballer, then they'll be half-way to victory."

He was listed as "Supplementary" on North Melbourne's Training List for 1956; and he played for the Second XVII in the first three rounds of 1956. Having been the best North Melbourne player in the Second XVII team's loss to Essendon—Essendon 12.25 (97), North Melbourne 9.5 (59) -- in Round 3, he played his first senior match for North Melbourne in Round 4, on Saturday, 5 May 1956, against Carlton, on the half-back flank, at Princes Park. In his ninth senior match (Round 12, 7 July 1956), he was selected as 20th man against St Kilda at the Junction Oval. He came on after half-time, and was almost immediately involved in a tussle with St Kilda's Jack McDonald. McDonald was reported for punching Macquire, and was subsequently suspended for four weeks. In the Round 16 match, against Fitzroy, played at Arden Street, on Saturday, 4 August 1956, Macquire broke a bone in his hand, and was not able to play until the next season.

On 21 September 1957 he played on the half-forward flank for the North Melbourne Second XVIII team that defeated Fitzroy and won the VFL Seconds' Premiership by four points: North Melbourne 14.13 (97); Fitzroy 13.15 (93). He kicked three goals, and was one of the best on the ground.

At the beginning of the 1960 season, North Melbourne removed Macquire from its training list on the grounds that he had retired.
