= Dominique Pasquier =

French sociologist (died 2025)

Dominique Pasquier (died 8 April 2025) was a French sociologist.

Pasquier was a graduate of the Paris Institute of Political Studies and held a doctorate in sociology. She was a research director at the CNRS, affiliated with the Center for Research on Social Links (CERLIS) at Paris-Cité University.

Pasquier was a professor and researcher at Télécom Paris and the Institut Mines-Télécom. She was a member of the steering committee of the journal Réseaux. From 2017 until her death, she was a member of the scientific council of La Fémis.
