= James Swetnam =

The Reverend James H. Swetnam S.J.
- Born: March 18, 1928; St. Louis, Missouri, U.S.
- Died: April 27, 2025 (aged 97); Florissant, Missouri, U.S.
- Occupations: Jesuit priest, biblical scholar, educator

Academic background
- Education: B.A. in Greek; M.A. and Licentiate in Philosophy (Saint Louis University); Licentiate in Theology (St. Mary’s College); Licentiate of Sacred Scripture (Pontifical Biblical Institute); Ph.D. in New Testament (University of Oxford)

Academic work
- Institutions: Pontifical Biblical Institute (1962–2010); Kenrick-Glennon Seminary
- Notable works: An Introduction to the Study of New Testament Greek (1992)

James Henry Swetnam, S.J. (March 18, 1928 – April 27, 2025) was an American Jesuit priest, biblical scholar, and professor emeritus of the Pontifical Biblical Institute (Biblicum) in Rome, where he taught Greek, Hebrew, and New Testament studies. He was also a prolific administrator and educator, known for pioneering preparatory language instruction and mentoring generations of students.

== Early life and formation ==
Swetnam was born on March 18, 1928, in St. Louis, Missouri, to Henry H. and Helen M. Luth Swetnam. He attended Holy Redeemer Parish grade school and graduated from St. Louis University High School, entering the Society of Jesus on August 8, 1945; he pronounced his first vows on August 15, 1947.

He earned a B.A. in Greek, along with a master's degree and a licentiate in philosophy from Saint Louis University (1949–1952). He pursued theology at St. Mary’s College, where he was ordained a priest on June 18, 1958. He completed a licentiate in Sacred Scripture at the Pontifical Biblical Institute (1960–62) and later earned a Ph.D. in New Testament from the University of Oxford (1975–78), focusing his dissertation on Hebrews in the context of the Aqedah.

== Academic career ==
Swetnam joined the faculty of the Pontifical Biblical Institute in 1962 and remained there—except for doctoral studies at Oxford and a sabbatical—until 2010. In 1963, he created a preparatory course in Greek and Hebrew for students lacking background in biblical languages, which became a hallmark of his teaching legacy.

He served as Vice-Rector (1984–1993), Dean of the Biblical Faculty (1986–1989), Pro-Dean of the Oriental Faculty (1996–1998), and Secretary General (1991–1997). In 1999, he became founding director of the Alumni Association, serving until 2010.

Over his career, Swetnam estimated teaching around 1,500 students from 85 countries in introductory Greek. He also conducted New Testament seminars, supervised doctoral theses, and contributed to the Biblicum’s publications. He occasionally taught at Mother Teresa’s novitiate in Rome and assisted in drafting the congregation’s constitutions. He also ministered during 50 Holy Weeks in 50 dioceses across Italy.

== Later years ==
In 2010, Swetnam returned to his native Missouri, serving as "professor in residence" at Saint Louis University, giving retreats, writing, and maintaining two websites: James Swetnam’s Close Readings and, later, James Swetnam’s Thoughts on Scripture (2019). He also taught part-time at Kenrick–Glennon Seminary. He lived at Jesuit Hall in St. Louis and later moved to St. Ignatius Hall in Florissant.

Swetnam died on April 27, 2025, in Florissant, Missouri, at the age of 97. He had been a Jesuit for 79 years and a priest for 66 years. A funeral Mass was celebrated on May 10, 2025, at the St. Louis University High School Chapel, followed by burial in Calvary Cemetery.

== Publications ==
- An Introduction to the Study of New Testament Greek (1992). Widely translated into Italian, Ukrainian, Korean, Spanish, and Portuguese.
- "Genesis 22, Hebrews, and a Hermeneutic of Faith" (lecture, 2003).

== Legacy ==
Swetnam’s devotion to teaching and pastoral ministry inspired generations of students and colleagues. Known for his effective pedagogy, multilingual fluency (including Italian, German, French, Spanish, Latin, Greek, and Hebrew), and deeply spiritual approach, he left a significant legacy in Catholic biblical scholarship.
