= Faleh Al-Nasser =

Jordanian politician (died 2025)

- فالح الناصر

Minister of Health
- In office 16 June 2001 – 14 January 2002

Personal details
- Born: Madaba, Jordan
- Died: 8 April 2025
- Education: University of Baghdad
- Occupation: Physician

Faleh Al-Nasser (Arabic: فالح الناصر; died 8 April 2025) was a Jordanian politician. He served as Minister of Health from 2001 to 2002.

Al-Nasser died on 8 April 2025.
