= Peter Kostelka =

Austrian politician (1946–2025)

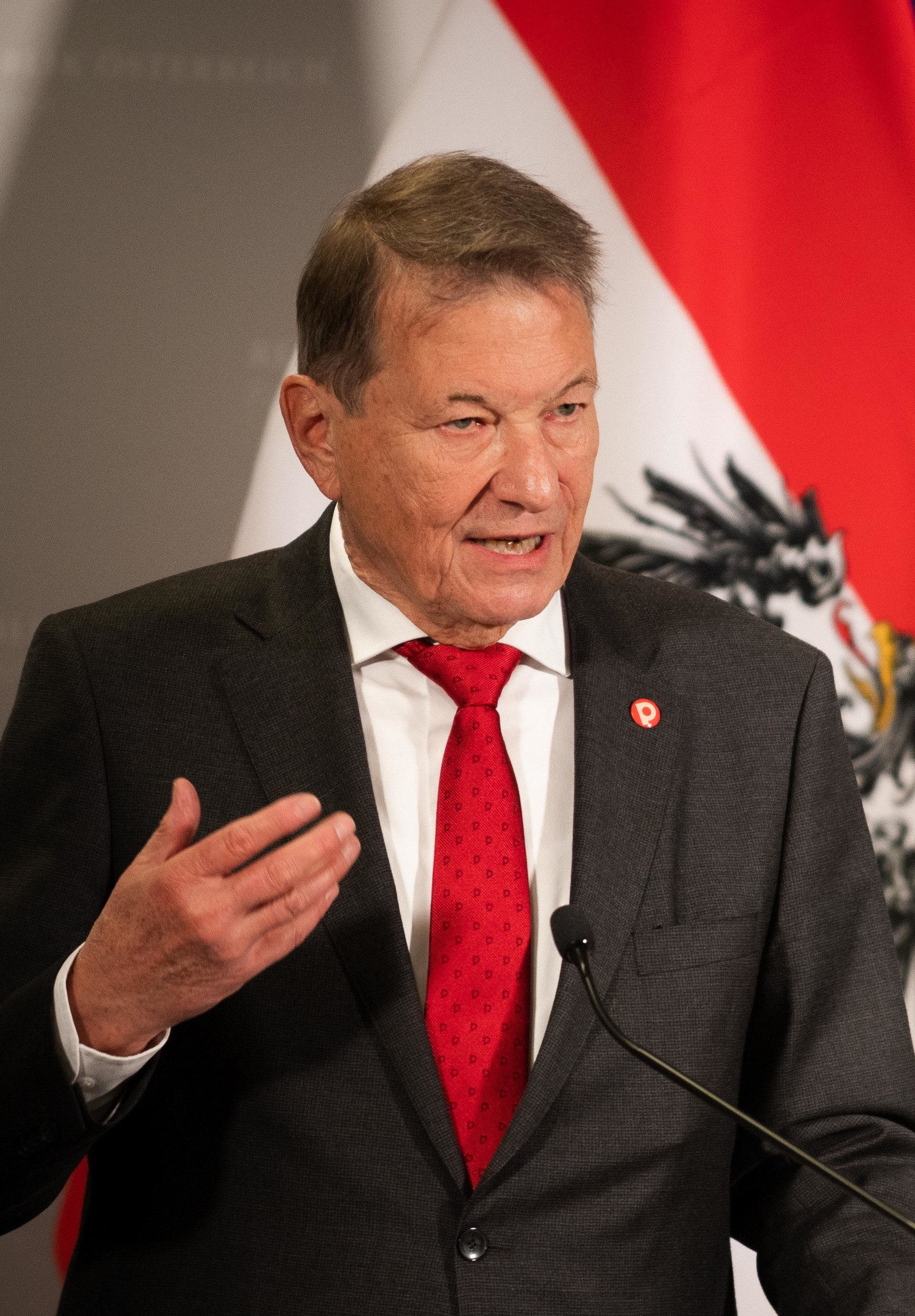
- Kostelka in 2021

Member of the National Council of Austria
- In office 7 November 1994 – 30 June 2001

Member of the Federal Council of Austria
- In office 1 July 1990 – 17 December 1990

Personal details
- Born: 1 May 1946; Bad Bleiberg, Carinthia, Austria
- Died: 17 April 2025 (aged 78)
- Political party: SPÖ
- Education: University of Vienna
- Occupation: Civil servant

Peter Kostelka (1 May 1946 – 17 April 2025) was an Austrian politician. A member of the Social Democratic Party, he served in the Federal Council from July to December 1990 and was a member of the National Council from 1994 to 2001.

Kostelka died on 17 April 2025, at the age of 78.
