= Luigi Nocera =

Italian politician (1955–2025)

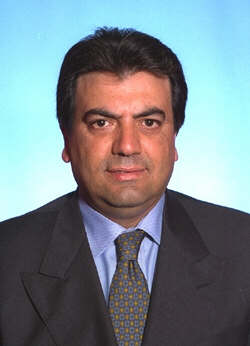
- Nocera in 1996

Member of the Chamber of Deputies of Italy for Campania 2
- In office 12 April 1994 – 29 May 2001

Personal details
- Born: 14 February 1955; Sant'Egidio del Monte Albino, Italy
- Died: 5 April 2025 (aged 70); Sant'Egidio del Monte Albino, Italy
- Political party: CCD (1994–1998); UDR (1998–1999); Union of Democrats for Europe (1999–2008)
- Occupation: Surgeon

Luigi Nocera (14 February 1955 – 5 April 2025) was an Italian politician. A member of the Christian Democratic Centre, the Democratic Union for the Republic, and the Union of Democrats for Europe, he served in the Chamber of Deputies from 1994 to 2001.

Nocera died in Sant'Egidio del Monte Albino on 5 April 2025, at the age of 70.
