= Enzo Flego =

Italian politician (1940–2025)

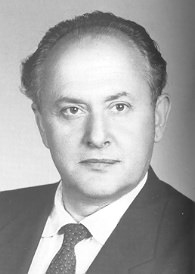
- Flego in 1992

Member of the Chamber of Deputies of Italy
- In office 23 April 1992 – 8 May 1996
- Constituency: Verona-Padova-Vicenza-Rovigo (1992–1994); Veneto 2 (1994–1996)

Personal details
- Born: 11 August 1940; Verona, Italy
- Died: 8 April 2025 (aged 84); Verona, Italy
- Political party: LN

Enzo Flego (11 August 1940 – 8 April 2025) was an Italian politician. A member of the Lega Nord, he served in the Chamber of Deputies from 1992 to 1996.

Flego died in Verona on 8 April 2025, at the age of 84.
