= Kamalini Dutt =

Indian Producer and Kathak Dancer

Kamalini Nagarajan Dutt was an Indian producer and Bharatnatyam dancer. She worked mostly for Doordarshan and was the major reason behind the restoration of old and decaying database (performances and Interviews of different Notable Artistes).

She died on 27 April 2025. She had a daughter.
