= Richard Vines (food critic) =

British food critic (1954–2025)

Richard Vines (29 March 1954 – 28 April 2025) was a British food critic. He was the chief food critic for Bloomberg News. Vines died on 28 April 2025, at the age of 71.
