= Adel Dridi =

Tunisian businessman and convicted criminal (died 2025)

- عادل الدريدي
- Dridi in 2016
- Died: 6 April 2025; Mornaguia, Tunisia
- Occupation: Businessman

Adel Dridi (Arabic: عادل الدريدي; died 6 April 2025) was a Tunisian businessman. He served as CEO of Yosr développement. He was convicted of running a scam estimated at 100 million Tunisian dinars.

== Biography ==
On 29 April 2013, Dridi was temporarily released from prison amidst a judicial investigation opened at the request of the Central Bank of Tunisia. On 21 June of that year, he disappeared, leaving behind 50,000 customers who invested money in his Ponzi scheme to make a quick profit. He reportedly reached Tabarka and attempted to cross the Algerian border with his victims' money. However, he was arrested in Sousse on 22 June 2013. On 12 August 2013, he was sentenced to 32 years in prison.

Adel Dridi died in prison in Mornaguia on 6 April 2025.
