= 2025 in Australia =

- Monarch: Charles III
- Governor-General: Sam Mostyn
- Prime minister: Anthony Albanese
- Population: 27,122,411 people at 31 March 2025.
- Australian of the Year: Neale Daniher
- Elections: Western Australia, Federal, Tasmania

- Decades: 2000s; 2010s; 2020s; 2030s
- See also: 2025 in Australian television; 2025 in Australian literature; Other events of 2025; Federal election; Timeline of Australian history

The following is a list of events including expected and scheduled events for the year 2025 in Australia.

== Incumbents ==
Monarch

Charles III

Governor-General

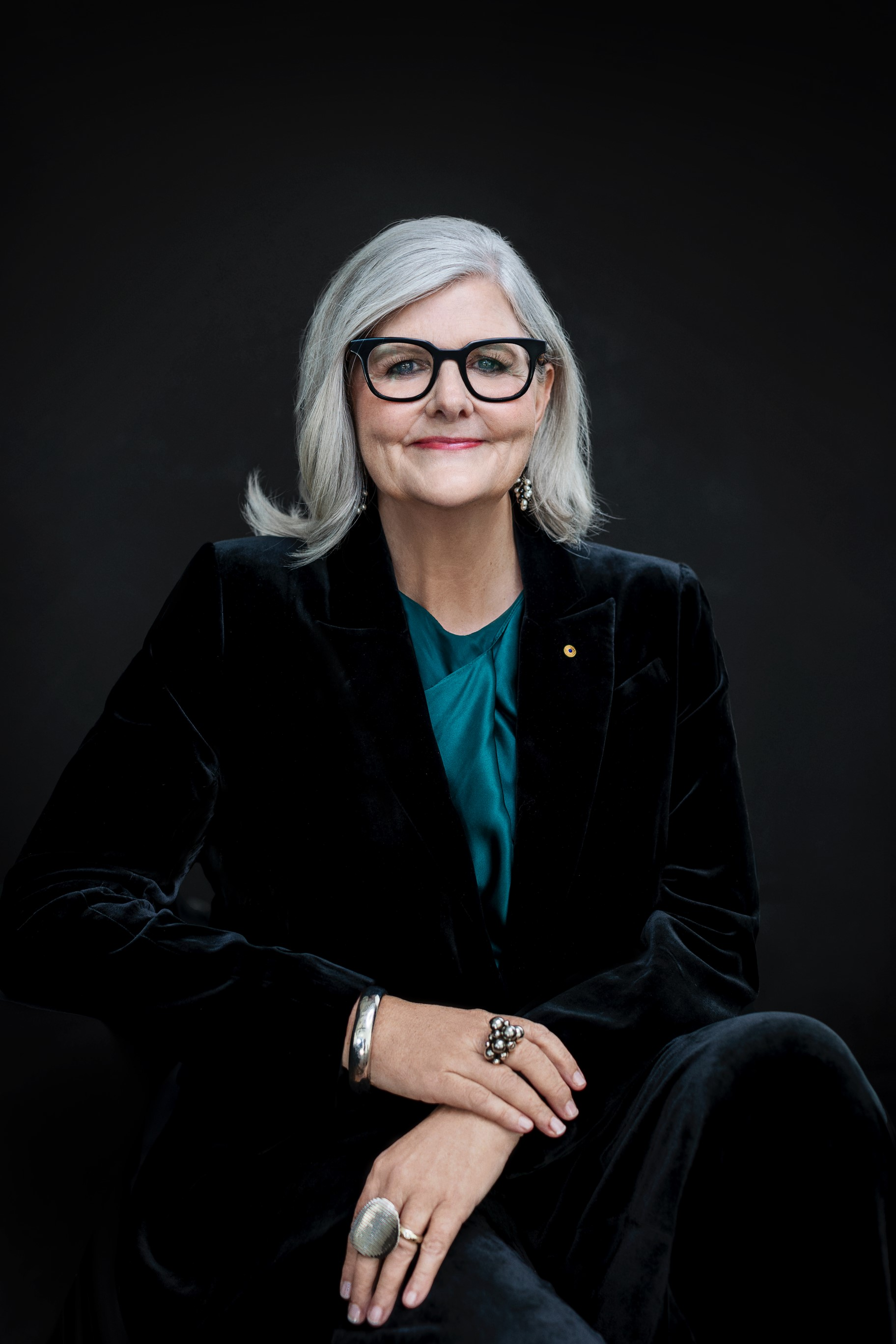
Sam Mostyn

Prime Minister

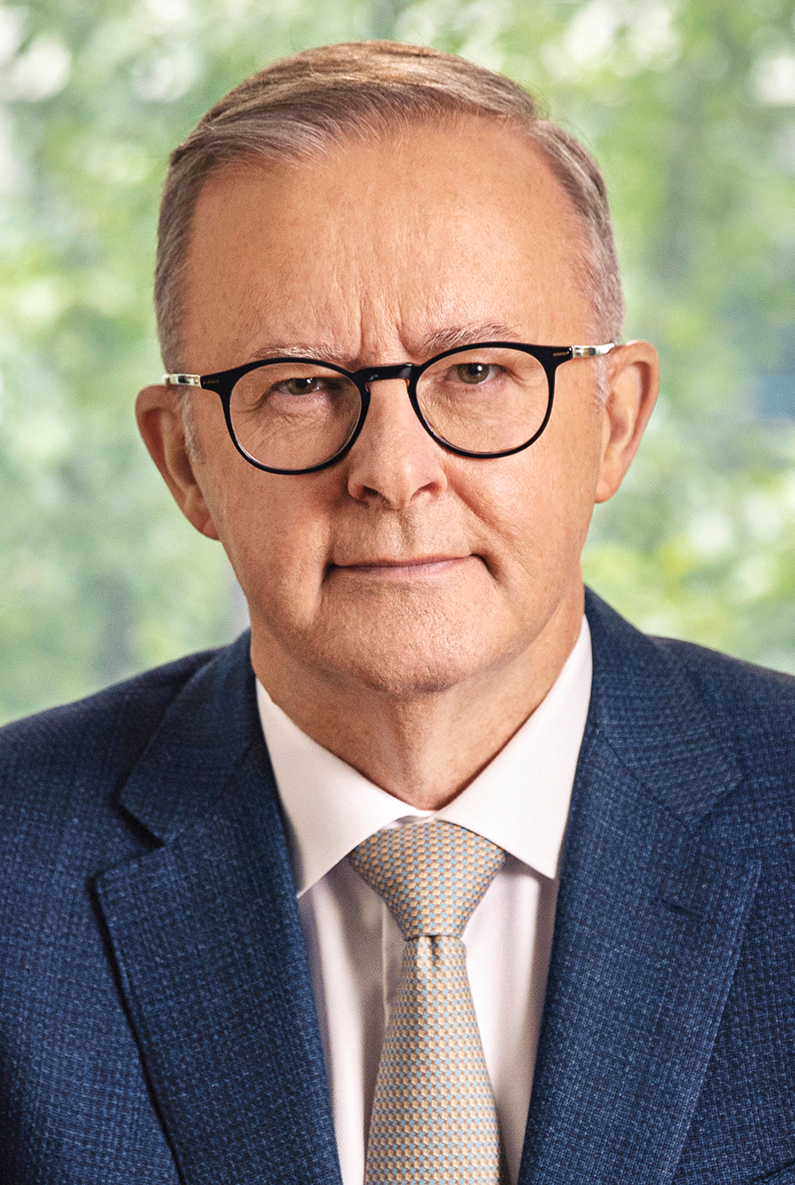
Anthony Albanese

Deputy Prime Minister

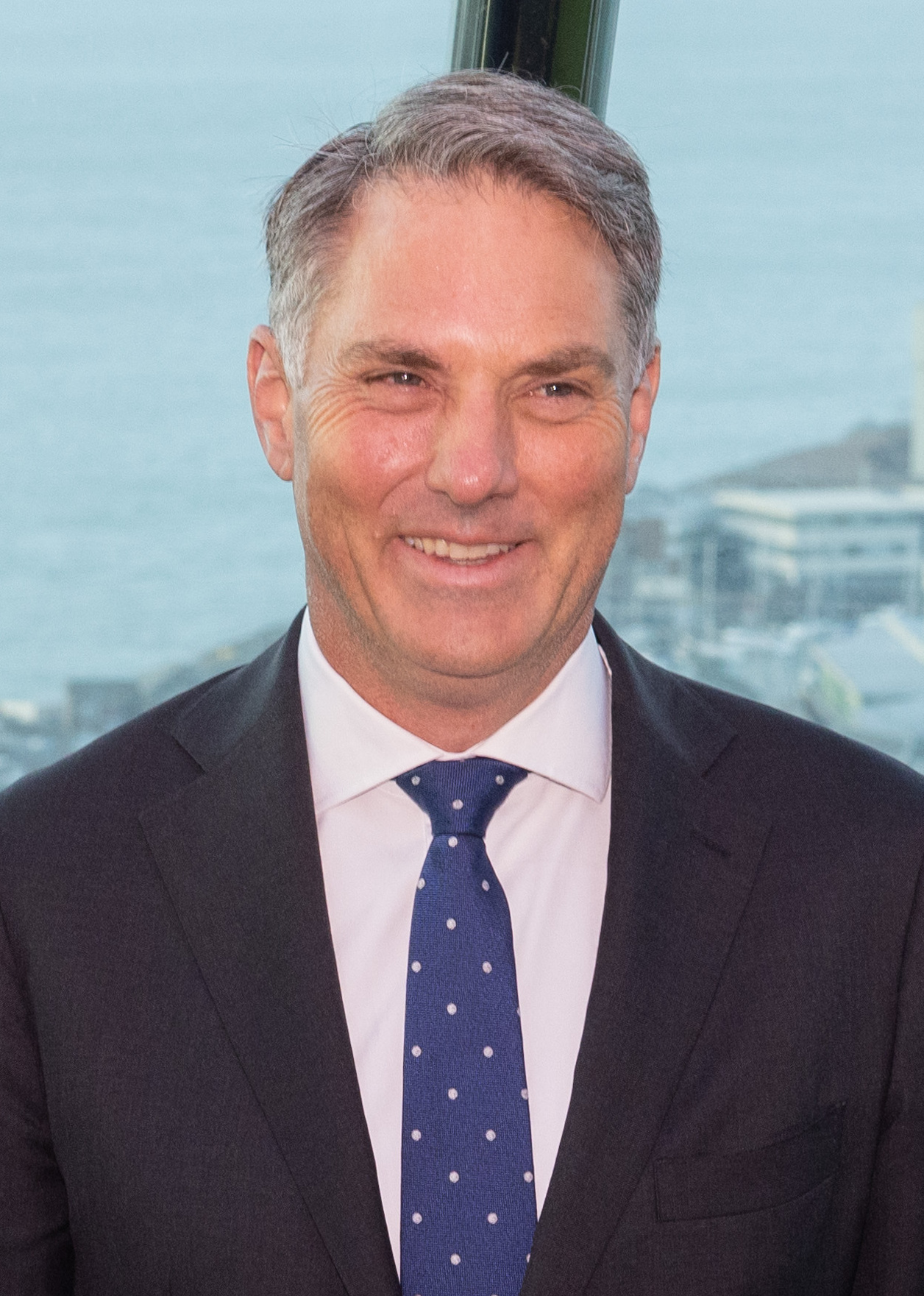
Richard Marles

Opposition Leader

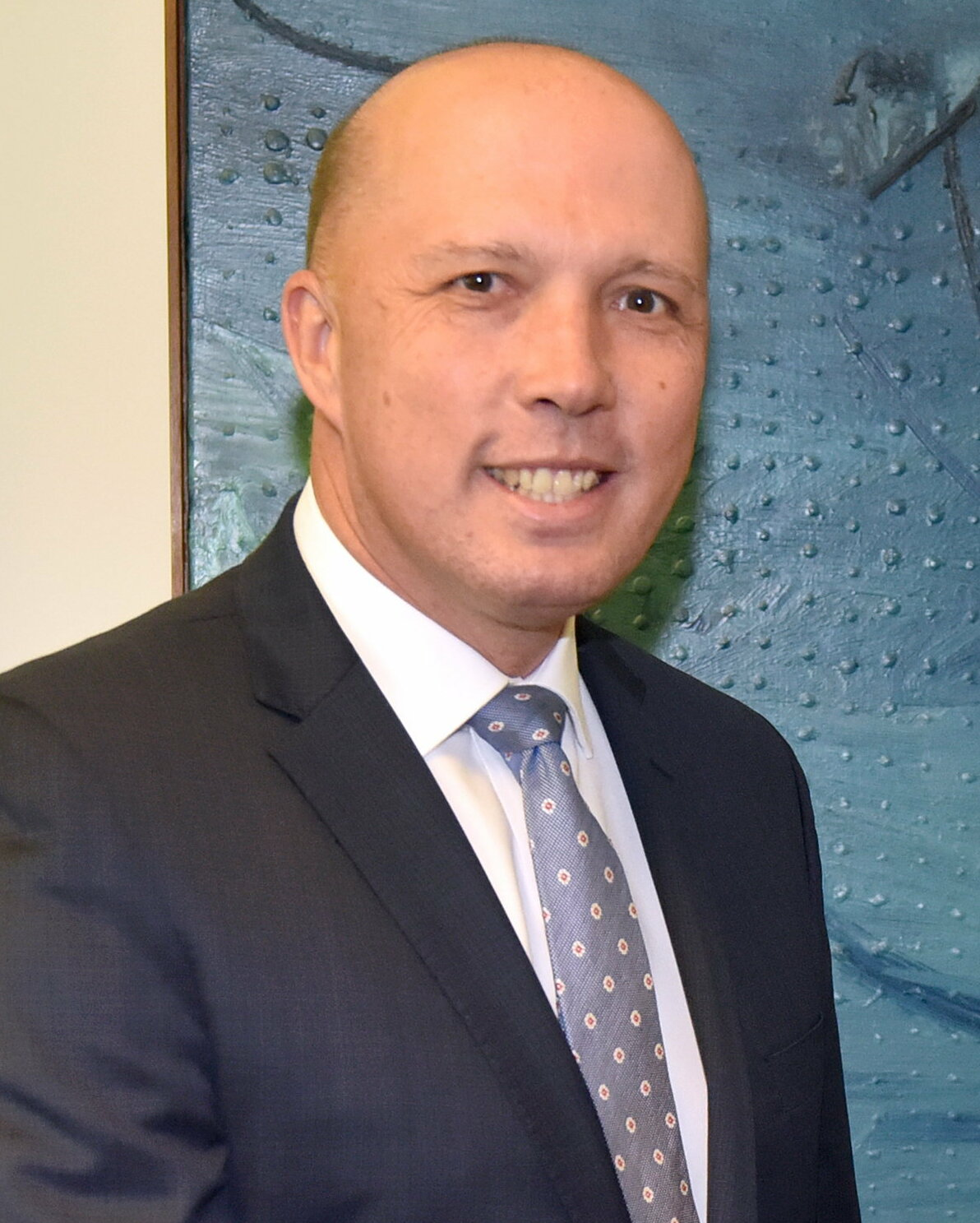
Peter Dutton (until May)
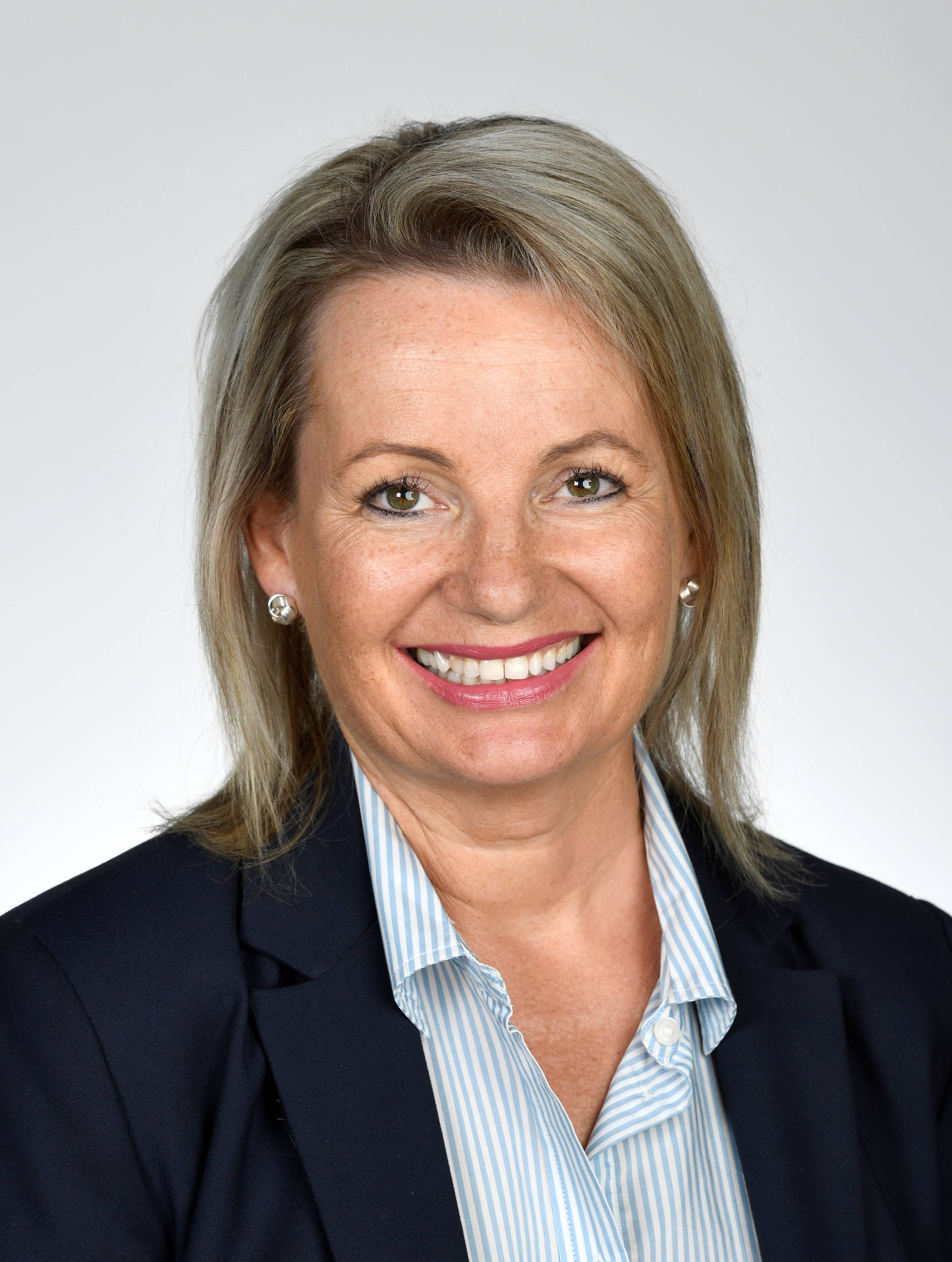
Sussan Ley (from May)

Chief Justice

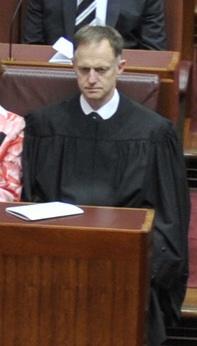
Stephen Gageler

=== State and territory leaders ===
- Premier of New South Wales – Chris Minns
  - Opposition Leader – Mark Speakman (until 20 November) then Kellie Sloane
- Premier of Queensland – David Crisafulli
  - Opposition Leader – Steven Miles
- Premier of South Australia – Peter Malinauskas
  - Opposition Leader – Vincent Tarzia (until 8 December) then Ashton Hurn
- Premier of Tasmania – Jeremy Rockliff
  - Opposition Leader – Dean Winter (until 20 August) then Josh Willie
- Premier of Victoria – Jacinta Allan
  - Opposition Leader – Brad Battin (until 18 November) then Jess Wilson
- Premier of Western Australia – Roger Cook
  - Opposition Leader – Shane Love (until 25 March) then Basil Zempilas
- Chief Minister of the Australian Capital Territory – Andrew Barr
  - Opposition Leader – Leanne Castley (until 10 November) then Mark Parton
- Chief Minister of the Northern Territory – Lia Finocchiaro
  - Opposition Leader – Selena Uibo

=== Governors and administrators ===
- Governor of New South Wales – Margaret Beazley
- Governor of Queensland – Jeannette Young
- Governor of South Australia – Frances Adamson
- Governor of Tasmania – Barbara Baker
- Governor of Victoria – Margaret Gardner
- Governor of Western Australia – Chris Dawson
- Administrator of the Australian Indian Ocean Territories – Farzian Zainal
- Administrator of Norfolk Island – George Plant
- Administrator of the Northern Territory – Hugh Heggie

== Events ==
=== January ===
- 1 January –
  - One home and a number of other buildings are destroyed in a bushfire burning in the communities of The Lakes, Woottating and Wooroloo east of Perth, while a separate bushfire burning in the Great Southern region forces the closure of the South Coast Highway.
  - Woolworths Group announce that it will be running a "Perfect for Australia Day" promotion in Woolworths and Big W stores following last year's controversial decision to not stock Australia Day-themed merchandise.
  - The National Archives of Australia releases Cabinet documents from 2003 and 2004 which reveal the Howard Government avoiding disclosing it had sent Australian troops to the Middle East months before officially authorising the country's involvement in the Iraq War.
- 2 January –
  - Police in Fiji confirm they are investigating the alleged sexual assault and robbery of two Virgin Australia crew members while they were celebrating New Year's Eve at a nightclub in Nadi.
  - A man is shot dead by police in a hospital carpark in Taree, New South Wales after he allegedly pointed a gun at officers. Police were initially responding to reports of the man firing shots into the air in Wingham 13 kilometres away.
  - A 28-year-old man is believed to have been killed in a shark attack while surfing at Granites Beach near Streaky Bay in South Australia.
  - A 3-year-old boy dies in a caravan fire at Boort, Victoria.
- 3 January –
  - A 7-year-old boy drowns in a river near a campsite on the Angusvale Track at Cobbannah in the East Gippsland region of Victoria.
  - A 56-year-old man is killed and a 60-year-old woman is injured when the jetski they were on collided with mangroves on the Barron River in Cairns, Queensland.
  - An abseiler is killed when he falls 20 metres off a cliff in the Ku-ring-gai Chase National Park near Sydney.
  - A 72-year-old man is arrested in relation to the alleged murder 25-year-old Meaghan Louise Rose who was found dead at Point Cartwright on the Sunshine Coast in 1997.
- 4 January – Two people are killed in a light plane crash near Nambucca Heads, just off the New South Wales Mid North Coast.
- 5 January –
  - A Forty Winks furniture showroom in the Melbourne suburb of Nunawading is destroyed by fire in a suspected arson attack.
  - The 50th anniversary of the Tasman Bridge disaster is commemorated.
- 6 January – In his first major announcement prior to the 2025 Australian federal election, prime minister Anthony Albanese announces a federal Labor government would provide $7.2 billion in funding to cover 80% of the cost of upgrading of Queensland's Bruce Highway.
- 7 January –
  - A man is charged for allegedly threatening worshippers at a Sydney synagogue.
  - A Cessna 208 Caravan floatplane crashes during takeoff at Thomson Bay off Rottnest Island. The pilot and two passengers were killed, while another three passengers survived with serious injuries.
- 8 January – After being lost in Kosciuszko National Park since Boxing Day, a 23-year-old bushwalker is found alive.
- 11 January –
  - Deputy leader of the Opposition in South Australia, Jing Lee announces she has resigned from the Liberal Party and will serve as an independent member of the upper house until the 2026 South Australian state election.
  - It is confirmed that 32-year-old Australian man, Happy Charity co-founder Rory Sykes has been killed in the Southern California wildfires.
  - The 60th anniversary of the Wanda Beach Murders is commemorated by the victims' families.
- 13 January –
  - A 58-year-old taxi driver and his two passengers, an 81-year-old woman and her 56-year-old daughter, are killed are when the Toyota Camry they were in was hit head-on by a Toyota RAV4 driven at high speed by a 43-year-old man travelling the wrong way on the Leach Highway in Perth. Authorities allege that the 43-year-old driver, who also died in the crash, had made a "conscious decision" to enter the highway via an off-ramp and drive on the wrong side of the highway, with police also launching an investigation into whether he had committed murder-suicide.
  - A 63-year-old Coles Supermarket employee is critically injured when she is allegedly stabbed in the back by a 13-year-old boy while working at a supermarket in Ipswich, Queensland. The boy is subsequently charged with attempted murder. With police alleging the victim was attacked with a knife taken from the supermarket, Coles withdraws kitchen knives from sale across Australia.
  - An Australian Federal Police officer is allegedly stabbed in the neck with a pen by a 34-year-old Perth woman who they were escorted off an aircraft while disembarking at Perth Airport. The woman is subsequently charged with two counts of causing harm to, and one count of obstructing, a Commonwealth public official.
- 15 January – Prime Minister Anthony Albanese vows to take the strongest possible action against Russia if it can be verified that Russia's military had executed 32-year-old prisoner of war Oscar Jenkins, after being captured while serving in the Ukrainian armed forces. Federal opposition leader Peter Dutton also says if that if Jenkins has been executed, Russian's ambassador to Australia should be expelled.
- 16 January –
  - A 44-year-old Sydney man becomes the first person to be charged in a new AFP operation that attempts to crackdown on antisemitic behaviour. The man is charged following a search of his home in Blacktown in relation to the alleged posting of death threats to a social media page run by a Jewish organisation.
  - 27-year-old Melbourne burlesque performer Katie Tangey who performed under the name of Vivien May-Royale is killed after becoming trapped in a townhouse fire in the Melbourne suburb of Truganina. Police suspect the fire was deliberately lit by two arsonists in a case of mistaken identity.
  - A three-year-old Australian girl dies in an accidental drowning while holidaying with her family in Bali.
- 17 January – A house in the Sydney suburb of Dover Heights, formerly owned by Jewish leader Alex Ryvchin is targeted with antisemitic vandalism. Two cars are also set alight and red paint also used to damage a nearby property. The attack is widely condemned.
- 19 January –
  - A caravan loaded with powergel explosives is discovered in the Sydney suburb of Dural along with antisemitic material and a list of Jewish synagogues, prompting a major counterterrorism investigation to be launched by the New South Wales Police Force, the AFP, ASIO and the Joint Counter Terrorism Team with police alleging the explosives were intended for targeted antisemitic attacks in the Jewish community. A Liverpool home is raided two days after the caravan was discovered.
  - A 22-month-old girl dies in a house fire in the Hobart suburb of Rokeby. Her five-year-old sister is taken to hospital in a critical condition but later dies in hospital.
  - Federal Member for Hinkler Keith Pitt submits his resignation effective immediately, likely leaving the electorate without a member of parliament until the 2025 Australian federal election.
- 21 January – A childcare centre near a synagogue in the Sydney suburb of Maroubra is set on fire and spray painted with antisemitic graffiti. NSW premier Chris Minns describes the alleged perpetrators as "bastards" who will be "rounded up" by New South Police while prime minister Anthony Albanese describes the incident as "an evil hate crime." The latest attack of antisemitism prompts Albanese to call a meeting of National Cabinet, during which the Australian Federal Police confirm they are investigating whether foreign actors have paid local criminals to carry out the attacks.
- 22 January – Western Australia Police commissioner Col Blanch confirms a homeowner who killed a 20-year-old man who police allege was armed with a machete during a home invasion in Kalgoorlie on 29 November 2024 would not be charged.
- 23 January –
  - A crew from Australian space company Equatorial Launch Australia, including its CEO Michael Jones, were allegedly threatened and assaulted in an incident on a rural property near Weipa, Queensland. Three people, aged 36, 64 and 27, were subsequently arrested and charged on 29 January 2025 with over 50 offences.
  - Twenty bronze statues in Prime Ministers Avenue in the Ballarat Botanical Gardens are vandalised, two of which are severed and stolen. The vandalism is condemned by the Gardens' foundation chair Mark Schultz who says he hopes the alleged offenders are identified and charged with "wanton destruction of public property".
- 25 January –
  - Victorian premier Jacinta Allan, Melbourne lord mayor Nick Reece and federal member for Deakin Michael Sukkar condemn the vandalism to an Anzac memorial in Parkville, a memorial to John Batman at Queen Victoria Market and to a Maroondah City Council citizenship ceremony marquee at Ringwood North.
  - Former Australian rules footballer Neale Daniher is named 2025 Australian of the Year.
- 26 January –
  - The 2025 Australia Day Honours list is announced. Allen Cheuk-Seng Cheng, Megan Davis, James Edelman, Gillian Triggs, Lyn Williams and Galarrwuy Yunupingu are all bestowed with the highest honour of the Companion of the Order of Australia (AC).
  - 16 members of the National Socialist Network are arrested in Adelaide and charged with various offences.
- 27 January –
  - The Queensland Parks and Wildlife Service confirm they would increase patrols on K'gari following a string of incidents in which dingoes have bitten children.
- 28 January – The Great Northern Brewing Co. halts its "Outdoors for a Cause" campaign which intended to raise money to buy land for national parks in support of the non-profit organisation Foundation for National Parks & Wildlife. The $200,000 campaign results in its customers boycotting the brand, alleging the campaign would see state forests converted into national parks, reducing the freedom to partake in outdoor recreational activities.
- 29 January –
  - The Supreme Court of Queensland convicts 14 members of the religious group "Saints", including its leader Brendan Stevens, for manslaughter over the death of eight-year old Elizabeth Struhs in 2022 from diabetic ketoacidosis, which came after the group withheld her insulin medication as part of their religious beliefs. Struh's parents and brother are also among those convicted.
  - Prime minister Anthony Albanese confirms the Australian Government is urgently attempting to verify a report it has received from Russia that alleges prisoner-of-war Oscar Jenkins is actually alive despite earlier reports he had been executed by Russian forces.
- 30 January – After pleading guilty to manslaughter after killing his wife Vanessa Godfrey in a hotel room on the Sunshine Coast during a drug-induced psychotic episode on 14 February 2022, Jeffrey James Godfrey is sentenced in the Brisbane Supreme Court to 12 years in jail and is automatically declared a serious violent offender.
- 31 January –
  - An internal investigation is released which finds eight Western Australia Police Force officers did not perform their duties and were subsequently disciplined after failing to correctly assess the risks before Mark Bombara murdered his wife's best friend Jennifer Petelczyz and her daughter Gretle before killing himself in the Perth suburb of Floreat on 24 May 2024 while attempting to locate his wife and daughter. Before the murders, Bombara's daughter had repeatedly attempted to warn police about her father's but to no avail.
  - The federal government's National Redress Scheme awards compensation to two men who allege they were sexually abused when they were children by cardinal George Pell who died in 2023.

=== February ===
- 1 February – To reduce the risk of intentional overdoses and liver damage, changes to the sale of paracetamol take effect which now makes it illegal for supermarkets and convenience stores to sell packs of more than 16 tablets.
- 2 February – Residents in the six suburbs of Townsville are told to evacuate their homes by midday after a slow moving weather system brings intense rainfall and widespread flooding to North Queensland. A woman dies after an SES boat with six people aboard capsizes in floodwaters at Ingham.
- 3 February – A 17-year-old girl is killed in a shark attack while swimming at Bribie Island.
- 4 February –
  - A second woman is found dead following flooding at Bemerside, Queensland.
  - New South Wales transport minister Jo Haylen resigns after admitting to her use of ministerial drivers for private trips, which she describes as an "error of judgement". The scandal prompts state premier Chris Minns to update the policy pertaining to the use of ministerial drivers.
  - The Western Australian Local Government Standards Panel finds Perth lord mayor Basil Zempilas had committed a minor breach of the Local Government Act by promoting his campaign for the 2025 Western Australian state election on his mayoral Facebook page. However, Zempilas raises concerns about how the details of the decision is leaked to the media and confirms he will be reporting it to the Corruption and Crime Commission.
- 7 February – 48-year-old Jonathan Wright is sentenced in the Toowoomba Supreme Court to life in prison for murdering Paul Sia after deliberately ramming Sia's vehicle off the road and then running him down with a 4WD on the Toowoomba Connection Road near Toowoomba on 20 November 2022 after an apparent drug deal had gone wrong.
- 8 February –
  - The 2025 Prahran state by-election is held.
  - The 2025 Werribee state by-election is held.
  - It is confirmed that human remains have been found inside the body of a crocodile located alongside the Watson River in Far North Queensland during a search for a 60-year-old Aurukun man who failed to return home from a fishing trip.
- 11 February –
  - Sam Kerr is found not guilty by a jury in London of racially harassing a Metropolitan Police officer after calling him "stupid and white" in January 2023.
  - The Country Liberal Party Northern Territory Government of Lia Finocchiaro confirms it has ended the NT treaty plans of the former labor government.
- 12 February – A TikTok creator posts a video of two NSW Health workers at Bankstown Lidcombe Hospital appearing to brag about refusing to treat Israeli patients. The two nurses are immediately stood down pending an investigation. However, NSW Health Minister Ryan Park states that he would not allow them to work in state health facilities again. The incident is condemned by NSW Police Commissioner Karen Webb and Prime Minister Anthony Albanese. The male nurse who appears in the video says that it had been "just a joke" and "a misunderstanding" and that he plans to apologise to the Jewish community.
- 13 February – The Department of Defence confirms it has lodged formal objections with the People's Liberation Army after an incident in the South China Sea on 11 February in which a Chinese fighter jet released flares within 30 metres of an RAAF P-8 Poseidon aircraft.
- 14 February – Severe Tropical Cyclone Zelia crosses Western Australia's Pilbara coast near the mouth of the De Grey River north-east of Port Hedland.
- 16 February – Chief Commissioner of Victoria Police Shane Patton resigns following a vote of no confidence from members of the police union.
- 18 February – Around 157 false killer whales are found stranded on a beach near Arthur River, Tasmania.
- 20 February – Australian and New Zealand Defence Ministers Richard Marles and Judith Collins confirm that the Australian and New Zealand Defence Forces are monitoring three Chinese warships that are sailing through international waters near Sydney.
- 21 February – Three airlines divert aircraft in response to reports of Chinese warships conducting live-fire exercises in the Tasman Sea. Foreign Minister Penny Wong meets with Chinese Foreign Minister Wang Yi at the G20 summit in South Africa to raise Australian concerns about Chinese naval activities in the Tasman Sea.
- 22 February –
  - Chinese warships conduct a second day of live fire exercises in the Tasman Sea while being monitored by Australian and New Zealand naval forces. Marles criticises China for failing to give "satisfactory reasons" for its live-fire drill on Friday.
  - The Albanese government announces it will invest A$8.5 billion in Medicare services including A$18 million in subsidised doctor's visits.
- 23 February –
  - Chinese Defence Ministry spokesperson Wu Qian defends Chinese live-fire naval drills in the Tasman Sea, claiming they complied with international law and did not affect aviation flight safety.
  - A large search commences after a 58-year-old Sydney fisherman is dragged into the water while attempting to retrieve a mako shark during a fishing competition near Newcastle.
- 26 February – A female Bankstown Lidcombe Hospital nurse is charged with three federal offences including threatening violence and using a carriage service to threaten to kill and cause offense in relation to an alleged antisemitic video incident.
- 28 February –
  - Ally Fashion collapses with liquidators appointed to the company after the Federal Court orders it to be wound up due to insolvency.
  - Star Entertainment Group enters a brief temporary trading halt before the share market opens prompting shares in the company to plummet by more than 15%.
  - Queensland police commissioner Steve Gollschewski announces he is stepping down from the position immediately after being diagnosed with cancer.

=== March ===
- 1 March –
  - A seven-day search for the remains of the three Beaumont children at the former Castalloy site in the Adelaide suburb of North Plympton concludes without any new evidence discovered.
  - A magnitude 4.4 earthquake occurs in Townsville, Queensland.
- 3 March – Victoria Police announce a $1 million reward for information relating to the murder of 48-year-old Gianni "John" Furlon who was killed in a car bombing on 3 August 1998 in the Melbourne suburb of Coburg North.
- 4 March – Western Australia Police arrest a 16-year old boy in Eaton who allegedly made an online threat against the newly-opened Sydney Islamic House mosque.
- 5 March –
  - A second Bankstown Lidcombe Hospital nurse is charged with using a carriage service to menace, harass or offend, and possessing a prohibited drug in relation to an alleged antisemitic video incident in February 2025.
  - Queensland authorities advise residents in southeast Queensland to evacuate in response to the approaching Cyclone Alfred.
- 6 March –
  - Cyclone Alfred brings stormy weather and heavy rainfall to southeast Queensland and northeast New South Wales.
  - Police arrest a 17-year old youth who breached security at Avalon Airport and attempted to board a Jetstar plane with a loaded shotgun and a fake homemade explosives. The incident leads to the temporary closure of Avalon Airport and prompted investigations by federal and state authorities into the airport's security practices.
- 8 March –
  - Thirteen Australian Defence Force personnel are injured when two army vehicles carrying a total of 36 personnel are involved in an incident near Lismore, New South Wales. One vehicle left the roadway and rolled, causing the other vehicle to tip over while trying to avoid a collision.
  - The 2025 Western Australian state election is held. The Labor Party led by Roger Cook is re-elected in a convincing victory over the Liberal Party which polled poorly. However, Perth lord mayor and former Channel 7 presenter Basil Zempilas wins the seat of Churchlands for the Liberal Party.
- 10 March – A 37-year-old man is killed by a shark while surfing at a beach near Esperance, Western Australia.
- 11 March –
  - In a keynote address to the Australian Institute of Company Directors, Qantas chair John Mullen opined that corporate Australia "did itself no favours" by vocally campaigning in support of the 2023 Australian Indigenous Voice referendum stating that companies risked appearing like they were "virtue signalling". His comments were criticised by Noongar law academic Hannah McGlade who said they showed "a lack of respect to Aboriginal people" and accused Mullen of losing credibility with his comments.
  - American actor Leonardo DiCaprio publicly criticises the Australian Government for approving South32's proposed expansion of its bauxite mine at Worsley in Western Australia's Northern Jarrah Forest with DiCaprio expressing his view on Instagram that mining developments were being prioritised over environmental protection due to separate government policies.
- 12 March –
  - The White House announces that the United States will not be granting Australia an exemption from tariffs on aluminium and steel imports despite president Donald Trump previously stating he would consider excluding Australia from the 25% tariffs. Australian prime minister Anthony Albanese criticises the decision describing it as "entirely unjustified" and "fundamentally at odds with the benefits that our economic partnership has delivered over more than 70 years."
  - American influencer Sam Jones is widely condemned after she posts footage on Instagram of her taking a baby wombat from its mother and holding it up to the camera. After various wildlife organisations criticise her actions, prime minister Anthony Albanese suggests Jones attempts to take a baby crocodile from its mother to see what happens. After returning to the United States, after having been threatened with having her visa cancelled, Jones subsequently apologises but also criticises Albanese for his comments and accuses the Australian Government of allowing farmers to kill wildlife including wombats.
  - A total of ten men aged between 22 and 36 are all found guilty of murdering 19-year-old man Girum Mekonnen at O'Callaghan Park in the Brisbane suburb of Zillmere in September 2020, while two other men are acquitted of all their charges. Justice Lincoln Crowley convicts Ben Abio, Alex Edward Deng, Kresto Wal Wal, Majok Riel Majok, Joseph Lokolong, Abraham Ajang Yaak, Juma Makuol, Santo Wal, Chan Kon and Gabreal Wal on the basis they were all party to a common unlawful purpose. The ten men all receive life sentences for the murder.
  - The High Court of Australia dismisses an appeal by the Commonwealth, ruling that they are liable for compensation for lost or impaired native title rights relating to a bauxite mining lease on the Gove Peninsula in North East Arnhem Land.
- 17 March –
  - Authorities in South Australia close Waitpinga Beach and Parsons Beach to the public after a microalgal bloom leads to a fish kill and the sickening of two surfers.
    - As of 19 June 2025 the algal bloom continued and oyster harvesting in American River, Port Vincent and Stansbury was closed, as was some of the mouth of the Murray River to commercial harvesting of pipis.
  - The Reserve Bank of Australia reveals the new design of the Australian five-dollar note will be a celebration of First Nation peoples' connection to Country.
- 18 March –
  - After entering its third day of deliberations in the Cairns Supreme Court, a jury is discharged after they advised they were deadlocked and unable to reach a verdict in the trial of 40-year-old Rajwinder Singh who is charged with murdering 24-year-old Toyah Cordingly on Wangetti Beach near Cairns in October 2018.
  - An inquest commences into the murder of Lilie James, a water polo coach who was killed by Paul Thijssen at St Andrew's Cathedral School in Sydney before he took his own life.
- 21 March –
  - The Australian Competition and Consumer Commission hands down a 441-page report following their investigation into Australian supermarket operations. The report finds that Woolworths and Coles don't have a strict duopoly in Australia and is unable to conclude whether price gouging is occurring.
  - A 39-year-old Australian woman dies when the snorkelling boat she was on capsizes in rough seas off Bali.
- 22 March – A 54-year-old construction worker dies after falling into a silo at a Boral quarry at Montrose on Melbourne's outskirts.
- 24 March –
  - Peabody Energy is ordered to pay $196,560 in fines plus legal and investigative costs to the New South Wales Environment Protection Authority after the company pleaded guilty in 2024 to two incidents which occurred in 2022 in which contaminated water entered Camp Gully Creek and the Hacking River which flows through the Royal National Park.
  - Federal teal independent MP Monique Ryan and her husband Peter Jordan both apologise after Jordan was observed removing a sign belonging to Ryan's political rival Amelia Hamer in the Melbourne suburb of Camberwell, Victoria. In his apology, Jordan claims the sign had been illegally placed on public property but concedes he should have reported his concerns to council.
- 26 March –
  - Australian clothing retailer Jeanswest collapses with the company's 90 stores across Australia set to close within months, putting hundreds of employees out of work.
  - Alcoa receives a $400,000 fine after pleading guilty in the Rockingham Magistrates Court to failing to ensure the health and safety of workers after work experience students at its refinery in Kwinana suffered caustic burns when a pump discharged a hot caustic solution in September 2022.
  - A woman is injured when a man allegedly drives a car into the Qantas call centre in Goodwood near Hobart. He is subsequently charged with a number of offences including attempted murder and arson.
  - Australian Greens senator Sarah Hanson-Young waves a dead fish during Question Time during a debate about legislation relating to reforms to Tasmania's salmon farming industry.
- 27 March –
  - 40-year-old former South Australian opposition leader David Speirs pleads guilty in the Adelaide Magistrates Court to two counts of supplying or administering a drug that wasn't cannabis to another person at Kingston Park between 1 August 2024 and 10 August 2024.
  - Australian discount retailer The Reject Shop agrees to a $259 million takeover bid by Canada's Dollarama.
- 28 March –
  - Prime minister Anthony Albanese officially calls the date for the 2025 Australian federal election sending voters to the polls on 3 May 2025 following a five-week election campaign.
  - 35-year-old former New South Wales police officer Kristian White is sentenced in the New South Wales Supreme Court to a two-year community correction order, requiring him to perform 425 hours of community service, after he was found guilty in November 2024 of the manslaughter of 95-year-old Clare Nowland, whom he tasered in an aged care facility in Cooma, New South Wales. The sentence is criticised by Nowland's family who describe it as "a slap on the wrist" with legal experts also expressing surprise at the non-custodial sentence imposed.
  - A pilot is critically injured when his aircraft crashes during an aerobatic display at the Australian International Airshow at Avalon Airport in Victoria.
- 31 March – A 16-year-old girl, a 13-year-old girl and a 10-year-old boy are found with stab wounds at a property in the Sydney suburb of Baulkham Hills. They were treated by paramedics before being taken to Westmead Hospital in a stable condition. A 47-year-old woman is also found at the scene with stab wounds and is taken to hospital under police guard. The woman is subsequently charged with the attempted murder of the three children.

=== April ===
- 1 April –
  - Authorities attempt to repair broken flood levees as the worst flooding since 1974 continues in outback Queensland.
  - 29-year-old Andre Rebelo is sentenced in the Western Australian Supreme Court to life imprisonment after he was found guilty in December 2024 of murdering his 58-year-old mother Colleen Rebelo in the Perth suburb of Bicton in May 2020 after he had taken out three life insurance policies in her name and forging her will.
- 2 April –
  - It is announced that an independent review led by former state governor Malcolm McCusker will be held into the 2025 Western Australian state election, following reports of widespread issues on polling day such as a shortage of ballot papers, delays with the counting and long wait times.
  - New South Wales education minister Prue Car criticises a school in the Sydney suburb of Kellyville for their decision to allow students to "opt out" of their annual Anzac Day commemoration. The principal of the school later apologises and says it is now an expectation that "all students" attend the service, while acknowledging the initial messaging "was seen as disrespectful by some members of the broader community and has detracted from our longstanding tradition of acknowledging and respecting Anzac Day..."
- 3 April –
  - 60-year-old Luke Samouel Simon is sentenced in the New South Wales Supreme Court to 31 years in jail with a non-parole period of 22 years for the murder of his daughter's fiance, 38-year-old tradie Damien Conlon in Oberon, New South Wales in February 2023. The murderer's daughter Linda Simon later states that she is "happy that justice was served" which had provided her family with "closure."
  - Two climate protestors from Rising Tide Australia are ushered out of a hospital in Maitland, New South Wales after they begin yelling at prime minister Anthony Albanese during his visit to the hospital.
  - Albanese is uninjured after he falls backwards from a stage at a Mining and Energy Union conference in Lovedale, New South Wales while repositioning himself for a photo opportunity.
- 4 April –
  - After 18 years in custody, 59-year-old Tony Mokbel is granted bail by the Victorian Court of Appeal after three judges approved his bail application.
  - A series of cyberattacks hit large Australian superannuation funds including AustralianSuper, Rest, Hostplus, Insignia, and Australian Retirement.
- 5 April – During opposition leader Peter Dutton's visit to Cazalys Stadium is Darwin during the federal election campaign, 10 News First camera operator Ghaith Nadir suffers a minor injury to his forehead after Dutton kicks a football which hits Nadir's camera, forcefully pushing the viewfinder into his forehead.
- 8 April – A 10-year-old Australian girl is killed in a cooking school fire in Singapore.
- 9 April – The Australian Transport Safety Bureau releases their final report into the fatal 2023 Gold Coast mid-air collision which highlights a series of safety issues that contributed to the collision between the two helicopters near Sea World including a faulty radio antenna.
- 10 April – After appearing in the Brisbane Children's Court, a male teenager is committed to stand trial in the Brisbane Supreme Court charged with "a commonwealth offence of committing acts done "in preparation for, or planning, a terrorist act" allegedly targeting federal opposition leader Peter Dutton.
- 11 April – 64-year-old child killer Rick Thorburn who murdered 12-year-old Tiahleigh Palmer in 2015 is found dead in his jail cell at the Woodford Correctional Centre, north of Brisbane.
- 15 April – Prime minister Anthony Albanese condemns a decision by the Canadian Food Inspection Agency which finds Vegemite to be non-compliant with Canadian health regulations due to the added Vitamin B which would force a chain of Australian-style cafes in Toronto to remove $9000 worth of stock and ban the product from being served. A science-based health risk assessment from Health Canada finds Vegemite presents a low risk to human health when consumed in the suggested serving sizes. The CFIA therefore allows the cafe to continue selling the product with revised labelling while they reach a longer term plan for Vegemite sales across Canada.
- 16 April – Australian footwear chain Wittner collapses and administrators appointed after 113 years of operations.
- 19 April – Prosecutors for the occupied territory of Luhansk confirm Australian teacher Oscar Jenkins has been charged with being a mercenary in an armed conflict with the Russian Federation on the side of enemy troops.
- 20 April – At least seven people are reported to have drowned following two days of strong swells along the coasts of New South Wales and Victoria.
- 21 April – 53-year-old Adrian Torrens is charged with murder after the body of 19-year-old woman Audrey Griffin was found in a creek at Erina on the New South Wales Central Coast on 23 March 2025. Torrens subsequently dies by suicide in his jail cell at the Silverwater Correctional Complex on 24 April.
- 21 April –
  - A 22-year-old woman is killed and another man shot during a string of alleged carjackings on the Sunshine Coast. A 41-year-old Tewantin man is subsequently charged with 15 offences including unlawful possession of a firearm, armed robbery and dangerous operation of a vehicle causing death. The man is accused of losing control of his vehicle and crashing into another vehicle, fatally injuring a 22-year-old passenger before allegedly shooting a 62-year-old man who had stopped to help others involved in the accident. Helen Powers, the mother of The Twinnies also alleges the man threatened her with the gun after stopping to assist. The Twinnies subsequently give an interview about the incident which goes viral for their unique way of communicating.
  - The death of Pope Francis prompts Catholics in Australia as well as other religious and political leaders to pay their respects, while flags on government buildings fly at half-mast. Both Anthony Albanese and Peter Dutton also suspend their campaigning for the federal election out of respect. The pope's death also results in Ukrainian-born Melbourne-based Cardinal Mykola Bychok becoming the youngest member of the 2025 papal conclave.
- 23 April –
  - 71-year-old supermarket owner Linford Feick is fatally stabbed after confronting an accused shoplifter in his Darwin supermarket. An 18-year-old man is subsequently charged with Feick's murder.
  - A series of violent and aggressive incidents occur in the lead-up to the federal election, prompting the Australian Electoral Commission to call for respectful behaviour during the election campaign. The incidents include a 17-year-old boy allegedly punching a 79-year-old man who was allegedly attempting to vandalise a corflute outside a pre-polling centre in the Sydney suburb of Ashfield; A 30-year-old man allegedly intimidating and behaving aggressively towards volunteers and kicking over corflutes in the Sydney suburb of Macquarie Park; and three men disrupting a candidate's forum in the Melbourne seat of Kooyong which local member Monique Ryan describes as "stupid, pointless posturing" by "right-wing bullies."
- 24 April –
  - 40-year-old former South Australian Liberal party leader David Speirs is sentenced in the Adelaide Magistrates Court after having earlier pleaded guilty to two counts of supplying drugs. He is fined $9,000 fine and sentenced to 37.5 hours of community service after being convicted of supplying cocaine to two people in 2024.
  - An anonymous submission to a parliamentary inquiry into Victoria's ambulance service reveals Ambulance Victoria breached strict COVID-19 rules in 2021 by holding an illegal gathering at a funeral while Victorians were enduring Stage 4 lockdowns at the height of the COVID-19 pandemic in Victoria. Despite a 10-person limit for funerals being in place, it's alleged up to 40 persons attended the funeral gathering. Premier Jacinta Allan condemned the event, describing it as incident which was entirely inappropriate.
- 25 April –
  - The 110th anniversary of the Gallipoli landings are commemorated at annual Anzac Day services across Australia and New Zealand.
  - Jacob Hersant, a figurehead of neo-Nazi organisation National Socialist Network, is escorted by Victoria Police away from an Anzac Day dawn service at Melbourne's Shrine of Remembrance after allegedly disrupting the service by leading booing during a Welcome to Country address by Bunurong elder Mark Brown. A similar incident occurs at Perth's ANZAC Day dawn service at Kings Park where a heckler disrupts an Acknowledgement of Country, which premier Roger Cook describes as "disgusting." Among the leaders who condemn the heckling at Anzac services is Prime Minister Anthony Albanese who states: "The disruption of Anzac Day is beyond contempt, and the people responsible must face the full force of the law. This was an act of low cowardice on a day when we honour courage and sacrifice."
  - A 36-year-old woman dies after falling 80 metres from Mapleton Falls on the Sunshine Coast.
  - Valerie the dachshund attracts international attention when she is finally rescued after spending 529 days roaming Kangaroo Island off South Australia after disappearing while her owners were on a camping holiday in November 2023.
- 26 April – The family of Virginia Giuffre, a prominent accuser of Jeffrey Epstein and Prince Andrew, announces that Giuffre had taken her own life on her farm at Neergabby, Western Australia stating that "she lost her life to suicide, after being a lifelong victim of sexual abuse and sex trafficking" and that she "was a fierce warrior in the fight against sexual abuse and sex trafficking".
- 27 April – A 37-year-old woman and a 41-year-old man are arrested, and four police officers are injured after protesters at an anti-vilification law rally organised by Women's Voices Australia held on the steps of Melbourne's Parliament House clashed with counter-protestors. Following the rally, some protestors moved through the CBD obstructing traffic and removing road signs before a stand-off with police occurs on Swanston Street culminating in officers deploying OC spray.
- 28 April – The coronal inquest into the Bondi Junction stabbings commences in the Coroners Court of New South Wales.
- 29 April – The 2023 Leongatha mushroom murders trial commences in the Supreme Court in Morwell, Victoria.

=== May ===
- 1 May – The South Australian Parole Board confirms one of the convicted Snowtown murderers, James Vlassakis has applied for parole with his hearing expected to be held in at least eight weeks.
- 2 May – 25-year-old Tyrone Thompson is sentenced to 22 years and six months imprisonment for murdering 21-year-old Mackenzie Anderson on 25 March 2022 in Newcastle while he was on parole for a previous DV assault.
- 3 May – The 2025 Australian federal election is held which sees the Australian Labor Party led by prime minister Anthony Albanese return to government defeating the Coalition in a landslide victory, and also sees Liberal leader Peter Dutton defeated in his own seat of Dickson by ALP candidate Ali France - a seat he was first elected to at the 2001 election.
- 4 May – Following his re-election as the Member for New England, Nationals MP and former deputy prime minister Barnaby Joyce announces he has been diagnosed with prostate cancer and will undergo surgery.
- 5 May –
  - Police officers discover the bodies of brothers, seven-year-old Max Johnson and six-year-old Sam Johnson at a home in Coonabarabran, New South Wales. Their 66-year-old grandmother is found at the scene with self-inflicted wounds and was arrested at the scene. She is taken to hospital before being transferred to a mental health facility. She is subsequently charged with murder.
  - Queensland Police charge a 55-year-old man with one count each of murder (domestic violence), fraud and attempted fraud after a 54-year-old woman drowned while kayaking at Lake Samsonvale on 27 November 2020.
- 6 May –
  - Former Australian soldier Nick Parsons has been killed alongside a British colleague while working for a land mine clearing charity near the eastern Ukraine city of Izyum.
  - Mike Bush is offiially announced as Victoria's new chief police commissioner to officially commence in the role on 27 June 2025.
  - Hungry Jack's pays fines to the Australian Competition and Consumer Commission totalling just over $150,000 for allegedly distributing Garfield toys between 20 May 2024 and 30 May 2024 without the required warnings about button batteries.
- 7 May –
  - Three children aged 4, 7 and 9 die in a suspicious house fire in the Toowoomba suburb of Harristown. Their 36-year-old mother is subsequently charged with three counts of murder, along with three counts of attempted murder and one count of arson.
  - NSW police commissioner Karen Webb announces her resignation after 38 years of service with the New South Wales Police Force.
- 8 May –
  - After a 12-week trial, a jury finds 24-year-old Jack Brearley and 29-year-old Brodie Palmer guilty of murdering 15-year-old schoolboy Cassius Turvey in the Perth suburb of Middle Swan in October 2022 while 27-year-old Mitchell Forth is found guilty of manslaughter. A fourth person is acquitted of both murder and manslaughter.
  - Australian Greens leader Adam Bandt concedes defeat seat of Melbourne which is won by Labor's Sarah Witty.
- 9 May – 200 members of the Coonabarabran community gather on the Castlereagh River for a candlelight vigil to mourn the deaths of brothers Max and Sam Johnson who were allegedly murdered by their grandmother.
- 11 May – Following his demotion from the Cabinet, Labor's Ed Husic describes deputy prime minister Richard Marles as a "factional assassin" in a television interview and says he believes the reason he was demoted from the front bench was partly due to his views on the Gaza conflict.
- 12 May – David Littleproud is re-elected as the leader of the National Party of Australia after being challenged for the role by Senator Matt Canavan.
- 13 May –
  - Sussan Ley is elected as the leader of the Liberal Party of Australia, becoming the party's first female leader. Ley narrowly defeats Angus Taylor who also contested for the leadership after former leader Peter Dutton lost his seat at the 2025 federal election. Ted O'Brien is elected as deputy leader.
  - Yarra City Council votes unanimously to permanently remove a statue of Captain Cook from Edinburgh Gardens in North Fitzroy following frequent attacks from vandals, a decision which prompts criticism from Victorian premier Jacinta Allan.
- 14 May – Fears grow for former Gladstone resident Caleb List who is serving in Ukraine's Foreign Legion with military sources suspecting he was recently killed in Kharkiv Oblast.
- 15 May –
  - Larissa Waters is elected as the leader of the Australian Greens following former leader Adam Bandt losing his seat at the 2025 federal election.
  - Australia's Go-Jo finishes in the semifinal of Eurovision 2025 in Switzerland with the single "Milkshake Man".
- 16 May –
  - Former soldier Ben Roberts-Smith loses his appeal in the Federal Court against a decision handed down in 2023 by Justice Anthony Besanko that he had, on the balance of probabilities, committed war crimes while serving in Afghanistan. Roberts-Smith indicates that he and his legal team will immediately challenge the decision in the High Court of Australia.
  - Australian man Oscar Jenkins is sentenced to 13 years imprisonment in a "strict regime penal colony" by a Russian-controlled court in Luhansk, Ukraine after having early been convicted of being a mercenary in an armed conflict. Australia's foreign minister Penny Wong criticises the sentence, accusing Russia of holding a "sham trial".
  - The Federal Court of Australia orders former Victorian Liberal Party leader John Pesutto pay $2.3 million in costs after having been successfully sued for defamation by Moira Deeming. The order puts Pesutto at risk of bankruptcy and a GoFundMe page is quickly established by Pesutto's supporters in an attempt to avoid him becoming bankrupt and therefore prevented from sitting in parliament.
- 17 May – Sarah Game resigns from One Nation to sit as an independent in the South Australian parliament.
- 18 May –
  - Hundreds of pro-Palestinian protestors gather at the State Library in Melbourne before marching towards St Kilda via the United States Consulate to commemorate Nakba. Smaller groups hold similar protests in other capital cities.
  - The Queensland Government announces it will be holding a 17-month commission of inquiry into the state's child safety system led by former Federal Court judge Paul Anastassiou KC.
- 20 May – The federal Coalition between the Liberal Party of Australia and the National Party of Australia is dissolved.
- 22 May – At least three people are killed while another is reported missing due to flooding along the Mid North Coast of New South Wales.
- 24 May – 2025 Tasmanian Legislative Council periodic election
- 28 May – The Liberal Party of Australia and the National Party of Australia parties reach a new Coalition agreement.
- 29 May - Angelina Lati dies from Lafora disease after being the first person in Australia to be diagnosed with it.

=== June ===
- 2 June –
  - Senator Dorinda Cox leaves the Greens and joins the Australian Labor Party.
  - The most expensive transport infrastructure project in Tasmania's history, the Bridgewater Bridge in Hobart, opens to traffic after two years of construction.
- 5 June – After the Disappearance of Pheobe Bishop on 15 May, James Wood and Tanika Bromley are arrested and charged with murder and interfering with a corpse.
- 5 June – Tasmanian Premier Jeremy Rockliff loses a vote of no-confidence 18 votes to 17. Labor speaker Michelle O'Byrne uses her casting vote to break a 17 to 17 vote tie. Rockliff announces he will seek an early election after emergency budget measures are passed on 10 June.
- 6 June – Human remains, consistent with the timeframe of Pheobe Bishop's disappearance, are found near the Goodnight Scrub National Park, which had been searched previously.
- 11 June – Australia joins New Zealand, Canada, the United Kingdom and Norway in banning and freezing the assets of two far-right Israeli government ministers Itamar Ben-Gvir and Bezalel Smotrich for advocating violence and the displacement of Palestinians.
- 16 June – A police officer is shot dead while serving a warrant to repossess a rural home in North Motton, Tasmania. The shooter is arrested after being shot and injured by a second police officer.
- 27 June – Jack Brearley and Brodie Palmer are sentenced to life imprisonment for the 2022 murder of 15 year-old Noongar Yamatji Cassius Turvey outside Perth.

=== July ===
- 1 July – 26-year-old childcare worker Joshua Dale Brown is arrested on over 70 charges, including child sexual abuse and producing child abuse material. The charges relate to offences allegedly committed against eight children at a Point Cook childcare centre between April 2022 and January 2023. The alleged victims are between five months and two years of age. Victoria Police and the Department of Health orders infectious diseases screening for 1,200 children who attended centres where Brown was employed between January 2017 and May 2025.
- 2 July –
  - It is revealed that another Melbourne man, Michael Simon Wilson, had been charged with serious sex offences, including bestiality and possession of child abuse material. The charges relate to the alleged sexual assault of a teenage boy in Coburg on 16 August 2024. The ABC reports that detectives discovered material on Wilson's devices that linked him with Joshua Dale Brown, with police alleging that the two men were known to each other.
  - The Yoorrook Justice Commission finds that British colonial settlers committed genocide against the Aboriginal population of Victoria from 1834 to 1851.
  - Airline Qantas is hit by a cyberattack affecting a third-party platform used for its customer service support, compromising the data of 6 million customers.
- 3 July – A man from northern New South Wales dies from Australian bat lyssavirus, making him the first confirmed case of the disease in NSW and only the fourth human case since the virus was discovered in 1996.
- 4 July – Two suspected antisemitic attacks are made on a synagogue in East Melbourne and a Jewish-owned restaurant in the Melbourne central business district.
- 6 July – One person is injured in a lion attack at the Darling Downs Zoo in Queensland.
- 7 July –
  - Erin Patterson is convicted of murder and attempted murder of her former in-laws in the 2023 Leongatha mushroom murders.
  - An inquiry into the death of Kumanjayi Walker finds that police constable Zachary Rolfe, who fatally shot the Aboriginal youth during a home arrest in Yuendumu, Northern Territory in 2019, was "racist" and finds "clear evidence of entrenched, systemic and structural racism" within the Northern Territory Police Force.
- 19 July – 2025 Tasmanian state election
- 20 July – A Reims-Cessna F406 operated by a logistics company crashes and catches fire in Oakey, Queensland, killing the pilot and a medical examiner on board.
- 25 July – New South Wales State MP Gareth Ward is convicted of sexual assault and rape in a case brought by two male victims.
- 30 July –
  - The government includes video-sharing site YouTube in the Online Safety Amendment for teenagers starting December, following a survey on harmful content being reported on the site.
  - Eris, the first domestically-made rocket to attempt to reach orbit from Australian territory, malfunctions during its maiden flight and crashes 14 seconds after its launch from a spaceport in Bowen, Queensland.

=== August ===
- 2 August – A Chinese national holding permanent Australian residency is arrested on charges of covertly collecting information about a Canberra Buddhist association. She appears in the ACT Magistrates Court on 4 August over a charge of "reckless foreign interference, contrary to section 92.3 of the Criminal Code Act 1995 (Cth)."
- 3 August – Tens of thousands of protestors march across Sydney Harbour Bridge in support of Palestine.
- 8 August – Gareth Ward resigns from the Parliament of New South Wales after losing an appeal against his conviction for sexual assault and rape in July.
- 11 August – Australian Prime Minister Anthony Albanese announces plans to recognise the State of Palestine at the United Nations in September.
- 16 August –
  - A magnitude 5.6 earthquake hits Kilkivan, Queensland and is felt across most of south-east Queensland, including in Brisbane and as far south as the Gold Coast, Queensland.
  - Australia grants asylum to Adelaide-based dissident former Hong Kong MP Ted Hui, who fled the territory in 2020 over his pro-democracy views.
- 18 August –
  - The Australian Federal Court issues a AU$90 million fine to Qantas for the illegal dismissal of 1,800 ground staff during the COVID-19 pandemic in 2020.
  - Australia bars far-right Israeli lawmaker Simcha Rothman from entering the country, prompting Israel to revoke the visas of Australian representatives to the Palestinian Authority in response.
- 23 August – 2025 Northern Territory local elections
- 24 August – Widespread protests across the country including Sydney, Brisbane and Melbourne with over 350,000 participants marching in support of Palestine.
- 26 August:
  - Prime Minister Albanese expels the Iranian Ambassador, Ahmad Sadeghi, and announces the Australian Government will designate the Islamic Revolutionary Guard Corps (IRGC) as a terrorist organisation after the Australian Security Intelligence Organisation (ASIO) found that the IRGC was responsible for instigating two attacks on a Jewish restaurant and a synagogue in late 2024.
  - Two Victoria Police officers are killed and a third is wounded while executing a warrant for historical sex offences at a property in Porepunkah, Victoria. Victorian Police launch a manhunt for the accused gunman Dezi Freeman, a self-described "sovereign citizen."
  - Australia Post indefinitely suspends most deliveries to the United States and Puerto Rico, citing tariffs imposed by the Trump administration.
- 28 August – Federal MP Bob Katter holds a press conference, in which he expressed support for the March for Australia protests. He was asked a question by a Nine News reporter about Katter's Lebanese heritage, to which Katter responded by threatening to punch the reporter.
- 29 August – Australia signs an agreement with Nauru allowing for the deportation of formerly detained people without valid Australian visas to the islands in exchange for financial compensation of at least AUD408 million.
- 31 August – March for Australia, a series of far-right, anti-immigration, and white nationalist protests are held in multiple Australian cities. A group of men from National Socialist Network identified as originally part of those protests in Melbourne, break away from the larger group and storm the Aboriginal Camp Sovereignty. Among those caught on video carrying out the attack is Thomas Sewell, a known neo-Nazi leader.

=== September ===
- 1 September –
  - A South Australian law banning fish-shaped soy sauce plastic dispensers comes into force.
  - A man is arrested after crashing his car through the gate of the Russian consulate in Sydney.
  - Three dockworkers are charged over the discovery of 506 kilograms of cocaine valued at more than AUD164 million ($107 million) behind a false wall in a shipping container from Europe on the Sydney waterfront over the weekend.
- 3 September – Former Premier of Victoria Daniel Andrews attends the 2025 China Victory Day Parade along with notable leaders such as General Secretary Xi Jinping of China, General Secretary Kim Jong Un of North Korea and President Vladimir Putin of Russia, triggering criticism over Andrews' relations with these leaders.
- 6 September – One person dies in a suspected shark attack at Long Reef Beach in the Northern Beaches of Sydney.
- 8 September – Erin Patterson, who was convicted of murdering three of her relatives and the attempted murder of a fourth, is sentenced to life imprisonment with a non-parole period of 33 years. Her sentencing hearing is the first in Victorian history to be broadcast live.
- 9 September – The Australian Pesticides and Veterinary Medicines Authority approves a vaccine developed by the University of the Sunshine Coast for use against chlamydia in koalas.
- 10 September – Jacinta Nampijinpa Price is ejected from the shadow ministry by Liberal leader Sussan Ley after refusing to apologise for anti-Indian immigration comments and refusing to support Ley's leadership.
- 18–19 September – The deaths of three people in South and Western Australia are blamed on calls to emergency services being prevented by a service outage that affects Optus over a 13-hour period.
- 21 September – Australia formally recognises the State of Palestine.
- 24 September – The Federal Court of Australia issues a $66 million fine on Optus for selling unwanted or unneeded products to financially vulnerable customers from 2019 to 2023.
- 29 September – Optus is hit by a nine-hour service outage.
- 30 September – The Therapeutic Goods Administration identifies 21 sunscreen brands as having failed to provide adequate Sun Protection Factors contrary to what they had claimed in marketing.

=== October ===
- 3 October – Andrew Hastie resigns from the Ley shadow ministry due to disagreements with Sussan Ley on immigration policy.
- 5 October – A man is arrested after opening fire on a busy thoroughfare in Sydney's Inner West, injuring 16 people.
- 6 October – Papua New Guinean Prime Minister James Marape and Australian Prime Minister Anthony Albanese sign a mutual defence agreement in Canberra.
- 9 October – India and Australia sign a bilateral security agreement allowing for the establishment of a forum for joint staff talks between their militaries and submarine rescue cooperation.
- 11 October – A Piper PA-32R crashes during takeoff at Shellharbour Airport in Albion Park Rail, New South Wales, killing all three occupants.
- 16 October – the NSW Supreme Court struck down anti-protest laws by ruling the laws were unconstitutional, due to its impermissible burden on the Australian Constitution's implied freedom of political communication.
- 18 October – 2025 Western Australian local elections.
- 26 October – An 80-year old passenger of the cruise ship Coral Adventurer is found dead on Lizard Island in the Great Barrier Reef after being accidentally marooned on the island the previous day.
- 28 October – Two workers are killed and another injured in an underground explosion at the Endeavor Silver Zinc Lead mine near Cobar; mining and trading operations are then suspended, pending investigation.
- 29 October – The Supreme Court of Queensland rules the ban on gender affirming care to teenagers unlawful but the ban is reinstated by the minister hours later.
- 30 October –
  - The Liberal–National Coalition polls at its record low in Newspoll.
  - The Victorian Legislative Council passes a Treaty Bill with 21 votes to 16. Labor, the Greens, Animal Justice Party and Legalise Cannabis Victoria vote yes while the Coalition, Shooters, Fishers and Farmers, Libertarian party and One Nation vote against.

=== November ===
- 2 November – The National Party of Australia abandons its support for net zero by 2050.
- 8 November –
  - Approximately 60 individuals associated with the National Socialist Network gather outside the New South Wales Parliament in Sydney carrying a banner reading "Abolish the Jewish Lobby" and chanting phrases including "blood and honour." The incident prompts widespread condemnation and resulted in the Premier announcing a review of police procedures and consideration of expanded powers to prevent hate-driven assemblies.
  - The Tasmanian House of Assembly passes an order to build Macquarie Point Stadium in Hobart by 25 votes to 9.
- 10 November –
  - The Wurundjeri people file native title claims over Melbourne and surrounding areas.
  - 2025 Canberra Liberals leadership election; Mark Parton and Deborah Morris are elected leader and deputy leader.
- 12 November –
  - The High Court of Australia upholds a 2023 law that revoked a 99-year lease by the Russian government on a property near Parliament House, Canberra that was to have been the site of a new Russian embassy.
  - Prime Minister Albanese and Indonesian President Prabowo Subianto confirm plans to sign a bilateral defence treaty in January 2026.
  - The South Australian Legislative Council votes down 11 to 9, a bill that would ban late-term abortions.
- 13 November – The Liberal Party of Australia abandons its support for net zero by 2050.
- 18 November –
  - 2025 Victorian Liberal Party leadership spill; Jess Wilson and Sam Groth are elected leader and deputy leader.
  - 2025 New South Wales National Party leadership election; Gurmesh Singh and Kevin Anderson are elected leader and deputy leader. Singh becomes the first person of Sikh descent to lead a major party in Australia.
- 21 November – 2025 New South Wales Liberal Party leadership election; Kellie Sloane and Natalie Ward are elected leader and deputy leader.
- 22 November – Tropical Cyclone Fina makes landfall over the Northern Territory as a category 3 storm, causing power outages and damage in Darwin.
- 24 November – Pauline Hanson wears a burqa on the Senate floor in a scene similar to a stunt performed in 2017 following the rejection of a bill to ban the burqa, resulting in a 90-minute suspension of proceedings. She is formally censured by the Senate the next day and suspended for seven sitting days.
- 26 November – The Digital Freedom Project announces it would commence legal action in the High Court against the new Social media age ban laws, saying they violate the implied right to political communication in the Constitution.
- 27 November –
  - Barnaby Joyce announces that he would resign from the National Party to sit as an independent MP.
  - One person is killed in a shark attack off Kylies Beach in Crowdy Bay National Park, New South Wales.
  - Australia designates the Iranian Islamic Revolutionary Guard Corps to be a State Sponsor of Terrorism due to its role in orchestrating and perpetrating terrorist attacks in Australia in 2024.
- 29 November – Prime Minister Albanese marries Jodie Haydon in a private ceremony at The Lodge, making him the first Australian prime minister to marry while in office.

=== December ===
- 4 December
  - The Tasmanian Legislative Council passes an order to build Macquarie Point Stadium in Hobart by 9 votes to 5.
  - Meta Platforms begins removing users under the age of 16 years from its Facebook, Instagram and Threads platforms in anticipation of the Australian Government's new social media restriction that came into force on 10 December.
- 6 December – Australia imposes a weapons embargo on Afghanistan and sanctions on four senior Taliban officials (Minister for the Propagation of Virtue and the Prevention of Vice Sheikh Mohammad Khalid, Minister of Higher Education Neda Mohammad, Minister of Justice Abdul-Hakim Sharei, and Chief Justice Abdul Hakim Haqqani), citing their role in human rights violations against women.
- 7 December – A firefighter is killed by a falling tree during a bushfire in Bulahdelah, New South Wales, that affects 3,500 ha (8,600 acres) and destroys four homes.
- 8 December – Barnaby Joyce joins One Nation.
- 10 December
  - The Online Safety Amendment comes into effect, introducing identification-based age checks to social media with the goal of restricting access to minors under the age of 16.
  - The Parliament of Queensland confirms plans to introduce new legislation in 2026 enabling child offenders aged ten years or over to be fit with ankle bracelets without parental consent following a successful 2021 trial targeting serious youth offenders.
- 14 December – At least 16 people are killed and 43 wounded during a mass shooting at a Hanukkah function at Bondi Beach. New South Wales Police Commissioner Mal Lanyon classifies the incident as a terrorist attack. One of the shooters is killed while a second shooter is in police custody.
- 15 December – Prime Minister Albanese vows to "eradicate" antisemitism in Australia and proposes new tougher gun laws limiting the number of weapons and firearms licenses in response to the Bondi Beach massacre.
- 16 December – Taekwondo instructor Kwang Kyung Yoo is sentenced to life imprisonment for the 2024 murder of a seven-year old boy and his parents in Sydney.
- 17 December:
  - The surviving Bondi Beach shooting perpetrator is charged by the New South Wales Police with 59 offenses including 15 counts of murder, committing a terrorist act and 40 counts of causing grievous bodily harmed.
  - New South Wales Premier Chris Minns announces that the New South Wales Parliament will reconvene the following week to introduce new firearms laws and a ban on protests during a "terror designation."
- 18 December:
  - Albanese announces that the federal government will introduce new hate speech legislation creating new aggravated offenses and giving the Department of Home Affairs new visa cancellation powers.
  - NSW Police conduct an operation in Liverpool, New South Wales and detain seven men in response to a "potential violent act being planned." NSW Police confirm that the seven men are assisting with their inquiries.
- 19 December:
  - Hundreds of surfers and beach-goers form a circle off the coast of Bondi Beach to pay tribute to victims of the Bondi Beach shooting.
  - Albanese announces that the federal government will introduce a new gun buy-back scheme to reimburse gun owners who hand in firearms that have been proscribed by new firearms legislation to be introduced in the wake of the Bondi beach shooting.
- 21 December:
  - A national day of reflection to honour victims of the Bondi Beach shooting is held. 10,000 people gather on Bondi Beach to honour the victims of the terror attack.
  - Anti-immigration protests are held in Sydney and Melbourne in the wake of the Bondi Beach shooting. The Sydney rally was organised by One Nation leader Barnaby Joyce, who called for the Albanese government to be fired.
- 24 December – The New South Wales Parliament passes new laws tightening access to firearms for people with suspected terror links and restricting mass protests following major terror incidents.
- 25 December – A suspected firebombing is carried out on a car belonging to a rabbi in the St Kilda East suburb of Melbourne.

== Arts and entertainment ==
=== January ===
- 1 January – Sydney's Burwood Council defends the demolition of the childhood home of Malcolm, Angus and George Young at 4 Burleigh Street, after it was purchased for $5.8 million in February 2023. The council confirms that despite the property being on the National Trust Register of Historic Houses, the register did not offer protection from the building being demolished as it has no statutory authority.
- 2 January – While in Australia to promote his biopic Better Man which was filmed at Melbourne's Docklands Studios, British singer Robbie Williams is presented with the keys to the city in Federation Square. At the event, he also defends using the Australian Broadcasting Corporation to promote the film during the New Year's Eve broadcast on ABC TV.
- 3 January – Nicole Kidman is presented with the International Star Award at the 36th Palm Springs International Film Festival in California for her role in Babygirl, which she dedicates to her late parents.
- 6 January – A Sydney developer apologises and conveys their "heartfelt regret" for the "oversight" which saw Sydney's "AC/DC house" in Burwood demolished, claiming they were not informed of the property's cultural significance. The demolition of the house casts questions on the effectiveness of the heritage protection process in saving historically significant landmarks from being destroyed.
- 8 January – The 50th anniversary of the Coca-Cola billboard in the Sydney suburb of Kings Cross is commemorated.
- 9 January – Australian actor Benjamin Rigby confirms his house is one of many to be destroyed in the Southern California wildfires.
- 14 January – The Australian Broadcasting Corporation confirms Hamish Macdonald will be succeeding Sarah Macdonald as the host of ABC Radio Sydney's Mornings program. He will be hosting the show from Monday to Thursday with Kathryn Robinson hosting the Friday edition.
- 23 January – Organisers of the Splendour in the Grass music festival confirm the event will not be returning in 2025.
- 25 January –
  - "Good Luck, Babe!" by American singer Chappell Roan tops Triple J's Hottest 100.
  - The 53rd annual Country Music Awards of Australia are held in Tamworth. Troy Cassar-Daley wins Album of the Year for Between the Fires, and Song of the Year for "Some Days". Cassar-Daley is also named Male Artist of the Year while Max Jackson is awarded Female artist of the Year. Jackson also wins Single of the Year for "Little More Country". Lane Pittman is named New Talent of the Year while Keith Urban is inducted onto the Australian Roll of Renown.
- 31 January –
  - Organisers of the Groovin' the Moo music festival confirm the event will not be returning in 2025.
  - Queensland Ballet announces Ivan Gil-Ortega as their new artistic director. Gil-Ortega succeeds Leanne Benjamin who departed from the role in August 2024 after having taken over from Li Cunxin just six months prior.

=== February ===
- 3 February – Following the Daily Mail's publication of photos of Nova 96.9 radio presenter Kate Ritchie sitting in a park looking distressed, Ritchie announces she is taking a break from the Fitzy and Wippa with Kate Ritchie radio show due to mental health issues which she says are being exacerbated by "relentless stalking" by the paparazzi.
- 6 February – The Coroners Court of Victoria confirms that the investigation into the death of celebrity chef Jock Zonfrillo at a Melbourne hotel on 30 April 2023 was finalised in August 2024 when the coroner determined the findings would not be disclosed to the public.
- 7 February – The 14th AACTA Awards are held on the Gold Coast. Among the major winners, Better Man wins the AACTA Award for Best Film with Jonno Davies winning for Best Lead Actor in a Film. Sarah Snook wins for Best Lead Actress in a Film for Memoir of a Snail. Heartbreak High wins for Best Drama Series while Boy Swallows Universe wins the AACTA Award for Best Miniseries or Telefeature.
- 13 February – Following criticism of Lebanese Australia artist Khaled Sabsabi from shadow arts minister Claire Chandler during Question Time in The Senate, Creative Australia rescinds an invitation to Sabsabi and curator Michael Dagostino for the 61st Venice Biennale. The rescinding of the invitations is condemned by the arts community triggering resignations and prompts Australian Greens senator Sarah Hanson-Young to call for a full independent inquiry into the controversy.
- 14 February – Creative Australia's visual arts head Mikala Tai and program manager Tahmina Maskinyar resign over the decision to drop Sabsabi.
- 26 February – Southern Cross Austereo announces that the company and Triple M presenter Marty Sheargold had "mutually agreed to part ways" after he is widely condemned for comments which included alleging endometriosis was a "made up condition" as well as those in which he criticised women's sport and players from the Matildas.

=== March ===
- 21 March – Maud Page is announced as the new director of the Art Gallery of New South Wales, making her the first woman to hold the position in the gallery's history.
- 25 March –
  - The annual Queensland Music Awards are held in Brisbane. Troy Cassar-Daley wins the public-voted Album of the Year award for Between the Fires while Young Franco's "Wake Up" wins Song of the Year. Amy Shark wins the awards for both the highest selling album (Sunday Sadness) and the highest selling single ("Beautiful Eyes") while Christine Anu receives the Lifetime Achievement Award.
  - Brisbane pianist Kellee Green wins the Jazz Award at the Queensland Music Awards for her work "River to Sea". In her acceptance speech she criticised the federal government for helping Israel "kill innocent Palestinian men, women and children" in Gaza. She received some backlash and accusations of antisemitism. Brisbane City Council withdraws funding from the event, with lord mayor Adrian Schrinner criticising the decision to present Green with the award and for her acceptance speech, stating: "The decision to hand a major prize to an offensively titled anti-Jewish song raises serious questions about whether the awards have been hijacked by extremists...The promotion of antisemitism at Tuesday night's Queensland Music Awards was utterly shameful and divisive. Allowing such vile hate speech to occur shows the awards seem to be no longer capable of achieving their own stated goal to 'promote diversity and inclusion'. As a result, we will be immediately withdrawing our funding and support for these awards." Brigidine College asks Green to take leave from her position as a teacher and issues a letter to parents which states that the college does not condone her comments and told parents that they value their connection with the Jewish community. Green received support from local musicians who rejected Schrinner's characterisations and said "These inflammatory claims are unfounded and dangerous in their attempt to suppress dissenting voices".
- 26 March – The opening performance of the Melbourne International Comedy Festival is cancelled after an audience member dies during the Opening Night Allstars Supershow at the Palais Theatre in St Kilda.
- 31 March –
  - Runner starring Alan Ritchson and Owen Wilson commences filming in Queensland.
  - Pianist Jayson Gillham confirms that his dispute with former managing director of the Melbourne Symphony Orchestra Sophie Galaise has been resolved. However, he also confirms his legal case against the Melbourne Symphony Orchestra pertaining to the cancellation of his performances after he made comments about the Gaza war, is still ongoing.

=== April ===
- 17 April – Palace Cinemas chief executive Benjamin Zeccola says a screen will need to be replaced at an estimated cost of $50,000 after cinema goers threw their drinks at it as part of the Chicken Jockey TikTok trend which also sees disruptive behaviour from patrons across Australia during screenings of A Minecraft Movie.
- 18 April – It is announced Byron Bay Bluesfest would return in 2026 after the 2025 event attracts 109,000 patrons - a decision which angers some people who say they feel betrayed after having bought tickets to what they thought was the final festival.
- 27 April – Kita Alexander's cover of Madonna's 1983 song "Holiday" commences being used in a Queensland tourism campaign.
- 29 April – Australian cookbook author Nagi Maehashi alleges Penguin Random House Australia has infringed her copyright, accusing fellow cookbook author Brooke Bellamy of plagiarism. Maehashi accuses Bellamy of publishing her recipes for caramel slice and baklava in her book Bake with Brooki. Bellamy rejects the allegations and claims her book contains over 100 recipes she created over many years. Although standing by her allegations, Maehashi subsequently issues a plea for online trolling of Bellamy to stop, emphasising it is a legal dispute between herself and Penguin Random House Australia. After Maehashi made her claims, US author Sally McKenney also levels similar accusations against Bellamy relating to a vanilla cake recipe. The allegations prompt an international conversation about the law surrounding the ownership, sharing, copying or republishing of recipes.

=== May ===
- 4 May – Lauren Zonfrillo, the widow of celebrity chef Jock Zonfrillo confirms that she will not be revealing the cause of her husband's death, following the Coroners Court of Victoria confirming that the findings would not be released publicly.
- 8 May – Chief Justice of the Federal Court Debra Mortimer orders the discrimination case brought by pianist Jayson Gillham against the Melbourne Symphony Orchestra to go to trial.
- 9 May – Julie Fragar wins the Archibald Prize for her portrait of artist Justene Williams.
- 15 May – ABC Radio Melbourne Breakfast co-host Bob Murphy apologises on air to colleague Sharnelle Vella for insinuating during the previous day's program that she had worked at strip club Spearmint Rhino. Vella rebuffs the apology stating that although she appreciated Murphy's words: "I won't let you off the hook on it. It was not okay."

=== July ===
- 11 July – The Murujuga Cultural Landscape is designated as a World Heritage Site by UNESCO.

== Sport ==
=== January ===
- 1 January – New South Wales police confirm Richmond player Noah Balta has been charged with assault following an alleged incident at a sports club in Mulwala, New South Wales in the early hours of 30 December 2024. Balta is granted conditional bail to appear before Corowa Local Court on 30 January 2025.
- 3 January –
  - Sydney Thunder player Cameron Bancroft sustains a broken nose when he and teammate Daniel Sams collide while fielding during a Big Bash League match against the Perth Scorchers at Perth Stadium.
  - The Tasmanian Government is undeterred by an independent report by Nicholas Gruen into Hobart's proposed Macquarie Point Stadium which finds the costs being significantly underestimated and describes the project as having the "hallmarks of mismanagement."
- 4 January –
  - The first day of the Magic Millions carnival on the Gold Coast is forced to be relocated to the Sunshine Coast after damage to the track at the racecourse in Bundall is discovered. Police commence investigations into the damage but animal rights activists deny that protestors would have been responsible.
  - The 2025 Canberra Tennis International tournament concludes with Brazil's João Fonseca crowned the winner of the men's singles, defeating American Ethan Quinn while Japan's Aoi Ito is crowned the winner of the women's singles, defeating China's Wei Sijia. The American duo of Ryan Seggerman and Eliot Spizzirri defeat France's Pierre-Hugues Herbert and Switzerland's Jérôme Kym in the men's doubles while the Australian pairing of Jaimee Fourlis and Petra Hule defeat Latvia's Darja Semeņistaja and Serbia's Nina Stojanović in the women's doubles.
- 5 January –
  - Australia regain the Border–Gavaskar Trophy after defeating India by six wickets in the fifth test at the Sydney Cricket Ground.
  - The United States wins the 2025 United Cup tennis tournament, defeating Poland in the final at Ken Rosewall Arena in Sydney.
  - The 2025 Brisbane International tennis tournament concludes. Czech Jiří Lehečka wins the men's singles after American Reilly Opelka retires due to injury. Belarusian Aryna Sabalenka defeats Russia's Polina Kudermetova in the women's singles. In the men's doubles, British duo Julian Cash and Lloyd Glasspool defeat the Czech duo of Jiří Lehečka and Jakub Menšík while Russians Mirra Andreeva and Diana Shnaider defeat the pairing of Australian Priscilla Hon and Russian Anna Kalinskaya in the women's doubles.
- 6 January –
  - It emerges that Ice Hockey Australia had advised the International Ice Hockey Federation in December 2024 that the 2025 Men's Ice Hockey World Championships's Division II Group A tournament would no longer be played at Melbourne's Icehouse as they feared the presence of the Israeli team would put the safety of the event at risk, due to the escalation of anti-Israeli sentiment in the city.
  - While playing for the Utah Jazz in their 105-92 defeat against the Orlando Magic, Patty Mills becomes the first Australian to play 1,000 NBA basketball games in North America.
- 7 January – A fire breaks out in the Norman Robinson Stand at Melbourne's Caulfield Racecourse. Police quickly deem the fire to be suspicious and establish a crime scene. A 51-year-old man is subsequently arrested.
- 9 January – Richmond player Noah Balta is suspended for four AFL matches and will be forced to miss two pre-season matches following the alleged assault at Mulwala on 30 December 2024.
- 10 January – Sam Welsford and Amber Pate win the respective elite men's and women's events at the Australian National Criterium Championships in Perth.
- 11 January – After the running of three races, heavy rain prior to the fourth race forces the Magic Millions race day on the Gold Coast to be rescheduled to 17 January 2025 due to the track becoming unsafe.
- 12 January – Australia defeat England by four wickets at North Sydney Oval in the first Women's Ashes WODI match.
- 14 January – Australia defeat England by 21 runs at Sydney's Junction Oval in the second Women's Ashes WODI.
- 17 January –
  - Australian motorcyclist Daniel Sanders wins the 2025 Dakar Rally.
  - Australia defeat England by 86 runs at Hobart's Bellerive Oval in the third Women's Ashes WODI.
  - During the 2025 Australian Open, Nine News sports presenter Tony Jones heckles fans of Novak Djokovic during Nine News Melbourne describing Djokovic as a "has-been" and "over rated" and they should "kick him out". As a result, Djokovic refused to do an on-court interview the following Sunday night with Jim Courier and describes Jones' comments as "insulting and offensive" which also made a "mockery of Serbian fans" declaring he would boycott Channel 9. Jones, who said the comments were intended to be humorous banter said he had contacted Djokovic's camp and apologised, which he later re-iterated on Today on 20 January. Djokovic ultimately accepts the apology.
- 18 January –
  - A spectactor is seriously injured when several cyclists competing in Adelaide's Down Under Classic crash into a safety barrier on the corner of East Terrace and Rundle Street.
  - Sam Welsford claims victory in the 2025 Down Under Classic.
- 19 January – Swiss cyclist Noemi Rüegg claims victory in the 2025 Women's Tour Down Under.
- 20 January – Australia retains the Women's Ashes after they defeat England by 57 runs at the SCG.in the first Women's Twenty20 International.
- 23 January – Australia wins the second Women's Twenty20 International at Manuka Oval in Canberra, with Australia winning by six runs under the DLS method in a rain affected match.
- 25 January –
  - Jhonatan Narváez wins the 2025 Tour Down Under.
  - Australia defeat England by 72 runs at the Adelaide Oval in the third Women's Twenty20 International.
- 26 January –
  - The 2025 Australian Open concludes in Melbourne with Madison Keys defeating Aryna Sabalenka in the women's singles and Jannik Sinner defeating Alexander Zverev in the men's singles.
  - At the official Australian Open trophy presentation, men's singles runner-up Zverev is heckled from the crowd by a spectator who screams "Australia believes Olya and Brenda" referencing domestic abuse allegations which Zverev strongly refutes. Tournament director Craig Tiley later condemns the heckling and says he was pleased when the woman was removed from Rod Laver Arena.

=== February ===
- 1 February –
  - Australia wins the first test match against Sri Lanka at Galle International Stadium by an innings and 242 runs.
  - Australia completes a 16-0 whitewash of The Women's Ashes series after they defeat England by an innings and 122 runs at the Melbourne Cricket Ground. Alana King is named Player of the Series.
- 3 February – Travis Head wins the Allan Border Medal while Annabel Sutherland wins the Belinda Clark Award at the Australian Cricket Awards in Melbourne.
- 6 February – America's National Football League announces it will play one of its regular season games featuring the Los Angeles Rams at the Melbourne Cricket Ground in 2026 as part of a multi-year agreement after discussions with the Victorian Government.
- 8 February – A Launceston man aged in his 60's drowns while competing in Tasmania's Coles Bay Triathlon.
- 9 February – Jordan Mailata becomes the first Australian to play in a winning Super Bowl team when the Philadelphia Eagles defeat the Kansas City Chiefs 40-22 in Super Bowl LIX at Caesars Superdome in New Orleans.
- 11 February –
  - Sydney Kings player Xavier Cooks is suspended from the National Basketball League following a potential anti-doping violation.
  - Matildas captain Sam Kerr says she is "fully focused on getting back on to the pitch" after a jury finds her not guilty of racially harassing a London police officer following her admission of calling him "stupid and white".
- 12 February – Olympic diver Melissa Wu announces her retirement.
- 20 February – Japan defeats The Matildas 4-0 in the opening match of the 2025 SheBelieves Cup at Shell Energy Stadium in Houston, Texas.
- 23 February – The United States defeat The Matildas 2-1 in the SheBelieves Cup match at State Farm Stadium in Glendale, Arizona.
- 26 February – Colombia defeat The Matildas 2-1 in the SheBelieves Cup match at Snapdragon Stadium in San Diego, California.

=== March ===
- 1 March –
  - The Young Socceroos win the 2025 AFC U-20 Asian Cup defeating Saudi Arabia in a penalty shootout in Shenzhen.
  - The 2025 NRL season commences at Allegiant Stadium in Las Vegas. (Note: local time in Las Vegas)
  - The Australian Jillaroos defeat England 90- 4 in the rugby league test match at Allegiant Stadium in Las Vegas.
- 4 March -
  - Due to the impact of Cyclone Alfred on South East Queensland, the two Round 1 AFL games which were scheduled to be played at Brisbane's Gabba and Carrara Stadium on the Gold Coast are both postponed to later rounds.
  - Due to the impact of Cyclone Alfred on South East Queensland, the NRL announces it will relocate the Round 1 game between the Dolphins and the South Sydney Rabbitohs from Lang Park in Brisbane to Western Sydney Stadium.
- 9 March – Neil Robertson defeats Stuart Bingham 10-0 to win the 2025 World Grand Prix snooker tournament in Hong Kong. It is the second time Robertson has won the World Grand Prix.
- 16 March – Lando Norris wins the 2025 Australian Grand Prix in Melbourne.
- 22 March – Marhoona, ridden by Damian Lane and trained by Michael Freedman, wins the Golden Slipper Stakes at Rosehill Racecourse.
- 25 March – Queensland premier David Crisafulli announces the venues for the 2032 Olympic Games. Admitting he is breaking his 'no new stadium' promise prior to the 2024 Queensland state election, he confirms a new 60,000-seat Olympic stadium would be built at Victoria Park alongside a new National Aquatic Centre. As part of the announcement, Crisafulli announces that the 2032 Olympics would likely be The Gabba's "swansong" prior to its demolition. The Fitzroy River in the city of Rockhampton is contentiously chosen as the venue for the rowing and canoe sprints which is met with opposition from Rowing Australia and World Rowing citing the river's current as problematic.
- 29 March – South Australia ends a 29-year-drought by winning the 2024-2025 Sheffield Shield, defeating Queensland by four wickets at Adelaide's Karen Rolton Oval.
- 30 March – Min Woo Lee claims his first PGA tour victory, winning the Houston Open finishing 20 under par.

=== April ===
- 1 April – Upon the release of the WTA rankings, world #12 tennis player Daria Kasatkina officially switches allegiances to Australia, celebrating her first official day as an Australian player after she is granted permanent residency.
- 3 April –
  - Two men smuggle firearms, one of which is loaded, into the Melbourne Cricket Ground for the AFL match between Collingwood and Carlton. Police discover the weapons while searching the men after they refuse requests to leave the MCG over their behaviour. The incident raises concerns about security measures at the MCG, in particular AI technology which was being used to screen for weapons.
  - It is announced former Wallabies player Jordan Petaia has signed a three-year contract with American NFL team the Los Angeles Chargers.
- 4 April – The Matildas defeat South Korea 1-0 in an international friendly at the Sydney Football Stadium.
- 7 April – The Matildas defeat South Korea 2-0 in an international friendly match at McDonald Jones Stadium in Newcastle.
- 8 April – Will Pucovski announces his retirement from all forms of cricket.
- 10 April – The Australian Transport Safety Bureau releases a report into the incident involving an aerobatic Extra EA 300-LT aircraft delivering the trophy at the Bathurst 1000 in December 2024, during which the aircraft sustained damage when the tail hit a concrete barrier. The report finds the pilot breach safety restrictions by not inspecting the damage to the aircraft before taking off despite being alerted to the issue by a helicppter, and also found the aircraft's landing and take-off occurred in no-fly zones occupied by spectators.
- 21 April – John Evans and Bree Rizzo win the men's and women's finals respectively at the 2025 edition of the Stawell Gift.
- 22 April – After admitting to assaulting a man in Mulwala, 25-year-old Richmond player Noah Balta is sentenced in Albury Local Court to an 18-month community corrections order, fined $3,000 and issued with a 10pm to 6am curfew which he must adhere to until 22 July 2025. Following sentencing, the AFL says they will take no further action in addition to the punishment they had already issued to Balta but says Balta will continue to undertake a behavioral change program, and that his actions do not represent behaviours acceptable to anyone in the AFL of the community.
- 25 April – A scheduled Welcome to Country address by Wurundjeri elder Joy Murphy Wandin at Melbourne's AAMI Park ahead of the ANZAC Day match against the Melbourne Storm and the South Sydney Rabbitohs is cancelled. The decision is made after neo-Nazi Jacob Hersant and his associates disrupt the dawn service during the Welcome to Country by at Melbourne's Shrine of Remembrance earlier in the day. Murphy Wandin describes the decision as hurtful as she had planned to wear her father's war medals during the address. Melbourne Storm chairman Matt Trips blames the cancellation on a "misunderstanding between the board and management" which led to "confusion with the pre-game cultural ceremony." Murphy alleges chief executive Justin Rodski had told her that the cancellation was partly because they wanted to "protect her" after the incident at the Shrine of Remembrance.
- 27 April –
  - Isabella Nichols and Jack Robinson complete an Aussie double by winning the respective women's and men's finals in the Rip Curl Pro finals at Bells Beach.
  - 23-year-old Jeremy Crawshaw is drafted by the Denver Broncos in the NFL.

=== May ===
- 1 May – The NRL Magic Round commences in Brisbane.
- 3 May – Tahli Gill and Dean Hewitt win bronze at the 2025 World Mixed Doubles Curling Championship at Fredericton in Canada - Australia's first ever World Curling Championships medal.
- 7 May – It is announced that the Australian Rugby League Commission has reached an agreement with the Western Australian Government which will result in a Perth-based team entering the National Rugby League in 2027.
- 8 May – Football Australia CEO James Johnson resigns.
- 9 May – Former Australian cricketer Stuart MacGill is sentenced to a one year and 10-month intensive corrections order and almost 500 hours of community service after having been found guilty in March of knowingly taking part in the supply of cocaine.
- 14 May – Former professional cyclist Rohan Dennis is sentenced in the Adelaide District Court for the events leading up to the death of his wife Melissa Hoskins in December 2023. After previously pleading guilty to an aggravated charge of creating the likelihood of harm, Dennis is given a 17-month prison term which is suspended on a two year good behaviour bond while also being banned from driving for five years. Judge Ian Press reiterated that Dennis was not criminally responsible for Hosking's death and was not being sentenced for causing it.

=== June ===
- 10 June – Australia qualifies for the 2026 FIFA World Cup after defeating Saudi Arabia 2-1 at the 2026 FIFA World Cup qualification in Jeddah.

=== August ===
- 21 August – Adelaide player Izak Rankine is suspended by the Australian Football League from playing in four matches after making homophobic remarks during a match against Collingwood.

=== September ===
- 7 September – Canberra Raiders claim the minor premiership following the conclusion of the main 2025 NRL season, their second overall and their first since 1990. Newcastle Knights finish in last position, securing the wooden spoon.
- 25 September – Montrezl Harrell has his contract terminated by the Adelaide 36ers after testing positive for tetrahydrocannabinolic acid in April while he was playing for the Xinjiang Flying Tigers in China.

=== October ===
- 15 October – The Australian Rugby League Commission imposes a 10-year competition ban on players who would participate in the R360 competition.
- 28 October – A 17-year old cricket-player dies after being hit in the neck by a ball during a local Twenty20 game at the Ferntree Gully Cricket Club in Melbourne.

=== November ===
- 13 November – Formula One racer Oscar Piastri is awarded the Don Award.

== Deaths ==
=== January ===
- 1 January –
  - Chad Morgan, country musician (b. 1933)
  - Tom Wyatt, horticulturist (b. 1946)
- 3 January –
  - Kate Coolahan, Australian-born commercial artist and fashion illustrator (b. 1929) (died in New Zealand)
  - Ron Challinor, actor (b. 1944)
- 5 January –
  - Mike Rinder, former senior executive of Church of Scientology International (b. 1955)
  - Jim Short, comedian (b. 1967)
- 6 January – Ken Randall, journalist (b. c. 1936)
- 8 January –
  - Lyn Lepore, Paralympic tandem cyclist (b. 1961)
  - Bill McMaster, Australian rules footballer (b. 1930)
- 9 January –
  - Bill Clements, Australian rules footballer (b. 1933)
  - Ian Miles, Australian rules footballer (b. 1952)
- 10 January –
  - Frank Cicutto, business executive, CEO of National Australia Bank (b. c. 1950)
  - Ted Kilmurray, Australian rules footballer (b. 1934)
- 12 January –
  - Arnold Frolows, radio personality (b. 1950)
  - Darryl Pearce, basketballer (b. 1960)
  - Jan Randles, Paralympic marathon runner (b. 1945)
  - Keith Rayner, bishop (b. 1929)
  - Bob Sercombe, politician (b. 1949)
- 13 January – Tony Gresham, golfer (b. 1940)
- 14 January –
  - Simon Townsend, television presenter (b. 1945)
  - Alan Green, businessman (b. 1947)
- 16 January – Colin MacNeil, Australian rules footballer (b. 1936)
- 20 January –
  - Leila Hayes, actress (b. 1942) (death announced on this date)
  - Adam Steinhardt, pole vaulter (b. 1969)
- 22 January – Nicholas Eadie, actor (b. 1958)
- 24 January – Ken Newland, Australian rules footballer (b. 1949) (death announced on this date)
- 26 January – Grant Tambling, Northern Territory politician (b. 1943)
- 28 January – Alan Demack, judge (b. 1934)
- 29 January –
  - Bruce Howe, musician
  - Harold Luntz, law professor (b. 1937)
  - Gary Stevens, rugby league player (b. 1944)

=== February ===
- 3 February –
  - Roger Charles Carolin, botanist and pteridologist (b. 1929)
  - Josh Mail, Australian rules footballer (b. 1974)
- 4 February –
  - Troy Selwood, Australian rules footballer (b. 1984)
  - Adrian Snodgrass, architect (b. 1931) (death announced on this date)
  - Dale Tapping, Australian rules footballer and coach (b. 1965)
- 5 February – Adam Hunter, Australian rules footballer (b. 1981) (death announced on this date)
- 7 February – Warren Pitt, politician (b. 1948)
- 11 February – Philip Brady, radio broadcaster (b. 1939)
- 14 February – Leonard Warwick, bomber and murderer (b. 1947).
- 15 February –
  - Barry Urban, politician (b. 1968)
  - Basil Rigg, cricketer (b. 1925)
- 17 February – James Harrison, blood donor (b. 1936)
- 18 February –
  - Corinne Cantrill, filmmaker (b. 1928)
  - Gerald Ridsdale, laicised Catholic priest and sex offender (b. 1934)
- 19 February – Snowy Fleet, musician (b. 1945)
- 23 February – Jacques de Jongh, musician (death announced on this date)
- 24 February – Keith Slater, cricketer (b. 1935) (death announced on this date)
- 25 February – Bob Hagan, rugby league player and coach (b. 1940)

=== March ===
- 1 March – Rosemary Crowley, politician (b. 1938)
- 2 March –
  - Colin Burdett, Olympic basketballer (b. 1931)
  - Roger Gyles, lawyer and judge (b. 1938)
- 3 March – Peter Bevilacqua, Australian rules footballer (b. 1933) (born in Italy)
- 5 March – Fred Stolle, tennis player (b. 1938)
- 6 March – Broderick Shepherd, wrestler (b. 1992)
- 8 March – Donald Hazelwood, violinist (b. 1930)
- 10 March – Sven Coomer, Olympic pentathlete and ski boot designer (b. 1940) (died in the United States)
- 12 March – John French, racing driver (b. 1930)
- 20 March – Leanne Cowie, drummer
- 21 March – Terry Reilly, Olympic archer (b. 1947)
- 26 March –
  - Kerry Greenwood, writer (b. 1954)
  - Nick Lalich, politician (b. 1945)
  - Jeff Potter, Australian rules footballer (b. 1941)
- 28 March – Richard Norton, actor and stuntman (b. 1950)
- 30 March – Andrew Krakouer, Australian rules footballer (b. 1983)

=== April ===
- 4 April –
  - Perri Cutten, fashion designer (b. 1952)
  - Petro Georgiou, politician (b. 1947)
  - Paul Karo, actor (b. 1935)
- 6 April – Tony Rundle, politician (b. 1939)
- 7 April – Elspeth Probyn, academic (b. 1958)
- 8 April – Keith Windschuttle, historian (b. 1942)
- 9 April – Sean King, Australian rules footballer (b. 1960)
- 10 April – Doug Ringholt, Australian rules footballer (b. 1942)
- 11 April –
  - Robyn Kahukiwa, artist and author (b. 1938) (died in New Zealand)
  - Lucy Markovic, model (b. 1998) (died in Germany)
- 18 April – Julian Benson, dancer and choreographer (b. 1971) (died in Ireland)
- 19 April –
  - Damien Broderick, author (b. 1944) (died in Portugal)
  - Rodney Francis Cameron, serial killer (b. 1952)
  - Aurelio Costarella, fashion designer (b. 1964)
  - Chum Taylor, motorcycle speedway rider (b. 1927)
- 20 April – Kimble Rendall, musician and film director (b. 1957) (death announced on this date)
- 21 April – Gerard Kennedy, actor (b. 1932)
- 22 April – Keith Stackpole, cricketer (b. 1940)
- 24 April – Happy Clapper, racehorse (b. 2010)
- 25 April – Virginia Giuffre, American-born justice advocate (b. 1983)
- 28 April –
  - Peter Bosustow, Australian rules footballer (b. 1957)
  - Ron Sigsworth, Australian rules footballer (b. 1961)

=== May ===
- 1 May – Peter Nixon, politician (b. 1928)
- 3 May – Ian Polmear, metallurgist (b. 1928)
- 4 May – Dennis Tipping, Olympic sprinter (b. 1939)
- 5 May –
  - James Baker, musician (b. 1954)
  - Race Mathews, politician (b. 1935)
  - Tracy Sorensen, author (b. 1963)
- 6 May – Iain Finlay, journalist (b. 1935)
- 8 May – Frances Crampton, gymnastics coach (b. 1945)
- 9 May – Gordon Nuttall, politician (b. 1953) (death announced on this date)
- 10 May – Bob Cowper, cricketer (b. 1940)
- 12 May – Adam Burton, baseball player (b. 1972)
- 15 May – Robert Walls, Australian ruler footballer and coach (b. 1950)
- 17 May –
  - Creswell Eastman, endocrinologist (b. 1940)
  - Adam Selwood, Australian ruler footballer (b. 1984)

=== June ===
- 13 June – Vic Aanensen, Australian ruler footballer (b. 1953)
- 23 June – Kevin Connor, artist, twice Archibald Prize winner (b. 1932)

=== July ===
- 1 July – Max McAlary, Olympic wrestler (b. 1929)
- 2 July –
  - Julian McMahon, actor (b. 1968) (died in the United States)
  - Richard Smart, viticulturist (b. 1945)
- 15 July – Bradley John Murdoch, convicted murder (b. 1958)
- 16 July – Barrie Robran, Australian rules footballer (b. 1947)
- 23 July – Henri Szeps, actor (b. 1943)
- 25 July – Sir Guy Green, judge, governor of Tasmania (1995–2003), and acting Governor-General of Australia (2003) (b. 1937)

=== August ===
- 5 August – Col Joye, musician (b. 1936)
- 7 August – Anthony Irvine Adams, public health physician (b. 1936)
- 11 August – Noel Tovey, dancer and choreographer (b. 1934)
- 13 August – Gary Hooper, Paralympian (b. 1939)
- 14 August –
  - Mark McArdle, Queensland politician (b. 1956)
  - David Stratton, film critic, historian and co-host of At the Movies (b. 1939 in England)
- 15 August – Tristan Rogers, actor (General Hospital, The Young and the Restless, The Rescuers Down Under) (b. 1946)
- 16 August –
  - Graeme Campbell, ALP politician and founder of the Australia First Party.(b. 1939)
  - Bob Simpson, cricket player (New South Wales, national team) and coach (national team) (b. 1936)

=== September ===
- 1 September – Joe Bugner, Hungarian-born British-Australian boxer and actor (b. 1950)
- 2 September – Sir Eric Neal, governor of South Australia (1996–2001), chief commissioner of Sydney (1987–1988), and chancellor of Flinders University (2002–2010) (b. 1924)
- 11 September – Tiana Mangakahia, basketball player (b. 1995)
- 16 September – Marion Maddox, academic and political commentator (b. 1965)

=== October ===
- 11 October – Michael Pratt, recipient of George Cross (b. 1954)
- 26 October – Howard Olney, judge and Western Australian politician (b. 1934)

=== November ===
- 8 November – Graham Richardson, politician (b. 1949)
- 9 November – John Laws, radio presenter (b. 1935)
- 16 November – Paige Greco, para-cyclist, Paralympic champion (2020) (b. 1997)
- 22 November –
  - Allan Moffat, Canadian-Australian race car driver (b. 1939)
  - Skye Gyngell, chef and food editor (Vogue) (b. 1963)
- 29 November – Toni Lamond, singer and actress (b. 1932)

=== December ===
- 4 December – Ted Egan, folk singer and public servant (b. 1932)
- 6 December – Bevan Spencer von Einem, convicted child murderer and suspected serial killer (b. 1946)
- 7 December – Rachael Carpani, actress (b. 1980)
- 23 December – Katie Allen, politician (b. 1966)
- 25 December – Nick Bolkus, politician (b. 1950)
- 26 December – Emma Johnston, marine ecologist and academic administrator, vice-chancellor of the University of Melbourne (since 2025) (b. 1973)

== Holidays ==
Holiday	Date	ACT	NSW	NT	QLD	SA	TAS	VIC	WA	Ref.
New Year's Day	Wednesday 1 January	Yes	Yes	Yes	Yes	Yes	Yes	Yes	Yes	
Australia Day	Monday 27 January	Yes	Yes	Yes	Yes	Yes	Yes	Yes	Yes	
Royal Hobart Regatta (only observed in certain areas of Tasmania)	Monday 10 February	No	No	No	No	No	Yes	No	No	
Labour Day (WA)	Monday 3 March	No	No	No	No	No	No	No	Yes	
Public holiday under different names	Monday 10 March	Canberra Day	No	No	No	Adelaide Cup Day	Eight Hours Day	Labour Day	No	
Good Friday	Friday 18 April	Yes	Yes	Yes	Yes	Yes	Yes	Yes	Yes	
Easter Saturday	Saturday 19 April	Yes	Yes	Yes	Yes	Yes	No	Yes	No	
Easter Sunday	Sunday 20 April	Yes	Yes	No	Yes	No	No	Yes	No	
Easter Monday	Monday 21 April	Yes	Yes	Yes	Yes	Yes	Yes	Yes	Yes	
Easter Tuesday	Tuesday 22 April	No	No	No	No	No	Yes	No	No	
ANZAC Day	Friday 25 April	Yes	Yes	Yes	Yes	Yes	Yes	Yes	Yes	
May Day	Monday 5 May	No	No	Yes	Labour Day (QLD)	No	No	No	No	
Reconciliation Day	Monday 2 June	Yes	No	No	No	No	No	No	No	
Western Australia Day	Monday 2 June	No	No	No	No	No	No	No	Yes	
King's Birthday	Monday 9 June	Yes	Yes	Yes	No	Yes	Yes	Yes	No	
Picnic Day	Monday 4 August	No	No	Yes	No	No	No	No	No	
Royal Queensland Show (Brisbane area only)	Wednesday 13 August	No	No	No	Yes	No	No	No	No	
Friday before the AFL Grand Final	Friday 26 September	No	No	No	No	No	No	Yes	No	
King's Birthday	Monday 29 September	No	No	No	No	No	No	No	Yes	
Labour Day	Monday 6 October	Yes	Yes	No	King's Birthday	Yes	No	No	No	
Melbourne Cup	Tuesday 4 November	No	No	No	No	No	No	Yes	No	
Recreation Day (all parts of Tasmania which do not observe Royal Hobart Regatta)	Monday 3 November	No	No	No	No	No	Yes	No	No	
Christmas Eve (from 7pm to 12 midnight)	Wednesday 24 December	No	No	Yes	Yes	Yes	No	No	No	
Christmas Day	Thursday 25 December	Yes	Yes	Yes	Yes	Yes	Yes	Yes	Yes	
Boxing Day	Friday 26 December	Yes	Yes	Yes	Yes	Yes	Yes	Yes	Yes	
New Year's Eve (from 7pm to 12 midnight)	Wednesday 31 December	No	No	Yes	No	Yes	No	No	No	

- 1 January – New Year's Day
- 26 January – Australia Day
- 10 March – Canberra Day
- 18 April – Good Friday
- 19 April – Easter Saturday
- 20 April – Easter Sunday
- 21 April – Easter Monday
- 25 April – Anzac Day
- 2 June – Reconciliation Day
- 9 June – Sovereign's Birthday
- 6 October – Labour Day
- 25 December – Christmas Day
- 26 December – Boxing Day

== See also ==
=== Country overviews ===
- 2020s in Australia political history
- History of Australia
- History of modern Australia
- Outline of Australia
- Government of Australia
- Politics of Australia
- Years in Australia
- Timeline of Australia history
- 2025 in Australian literature
- 2025 in Australian music
- 2025 in Australian television
- List of Australian films of 2025
