= Twinnies =

Twinnies may refer to:

- Twinnies (duo), a musical duo from Bavaria
- Natalie and Nadiya Anderson, Survivor contestants
- Paula and Bridgette Powers (born 1974), Australian conservationist identical twin sisters
