= Adam Burton =

Adam Burton may refer to:

- Maxwell Atoms (Adam Maxwell Burton, born 1974), American animator, screenwriter, storyboard artist, and voice actor
- Adam Burton (baseball) (1972–2025), Australian baseball player
