= Death of Pheobe Bishop =

2025 Australian murder case

Pheobe Bishop
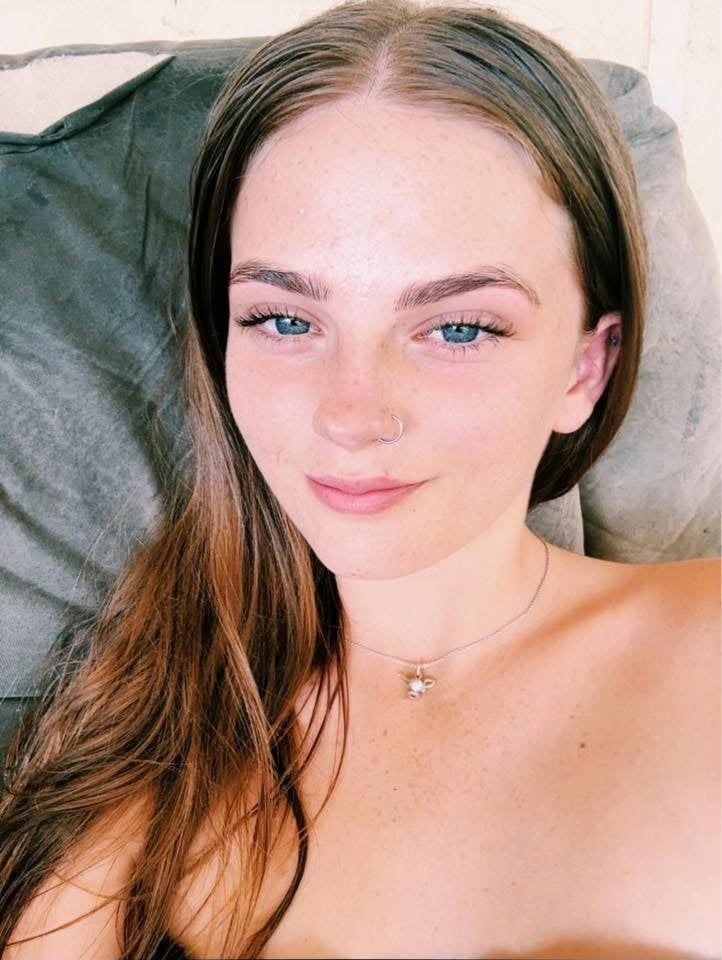
- Disappeared: 15 May 2025
- Body discovered: 6 June 2025 near Goodnight Scrub National Park
- Height: 180 cm (5 ft 11 in)
- Mother: Kylie Johnson

On 15 May 2025, Pheobe Bishop, a 17-year-old Australian teenager, disappeared in Bundaberg, Queensland, Australia. On 5 June, police arrested Bishop's housemates, James Wood and Tanika Bromley, who were each charged with murder and two counts of interfering with a corpse. The following day, Bishop's remains were found near Goodnight Scrub National Park.

== Background ==
Bishop was described at the time of her disappearance as being approximately 180 cm (5 ft 11 in) tall and having a pale complexion, long dyed red hair, and hazel eyes. At the time, Bishop was living in a property with two housemates, James Wood and Tanika Bromley, in the rural town of Gin Gin, approximately 51 kilometres (32 mi) west of Bundaberg. Bromley had previously worked for Bishop's mother before she was made redundant in 2024.

Following her disappearance Bishop's mother described her as someone who is "strong-willed and [has] followed her own beat to life".

== Disappearance ==
On the morning of 15 May 2025, Bishop was seen at approximately 8:30am at Airport Drive, Bundaberg. She was last seen carrying luggage, wearing a green tank top and grey sweatpants, and was due to fly from Bundaberg to Brisbane before travelling to Western Australia to see her boyfriend. Bishop did not check in for the flight and had not been seen since. A missing person's alert was issued by Queensland Police the following day.

== Investigation ==
When Bishop failed to arrive in Brisbane or Western Australia, Queensland Police Service launched an investigation into her disappearance. The investigation initially sought information and dashcam footage from the Airport Drive and Samuels Road area in Bundaberg, and the Gin Gin area from 15 May 2025. Police declared the vehicle Bishop was last seen in, a grey Hyundai ix35, and the property she was living in at Gin Gin, as crime scenes. On 16 May 2025, Queensland Police issued a missing persons alert.

Detective Acting Inspector Ryan Thompson said Bishop was dropped at Airport Drive by "associates" but did not enter the terminal. Detective Inspector Craig Mansfield later said that Bishop was in the car that drove by the airport, but that no one exited the vehicle.

On 23 May, police expanded the investigation following the discovery of phone data, deploying specialist police, including the Dive Squad, to Goodnight Scrub National Park to conduct land and waterway searches. Some items, believed to be linked to the investigation, were located during the search and were seized for forensic examination. Police suspected that some evidence may have been moved from Goodnight Scrub National Park prior to police arrival.

On 26 May 2025, Queensland Premier David Crisafulli said Bishop's disappearance was deeply concerning. Search efforts intensified, with the deployment of cadaver dogs in the Good Night Scrub National Park.

=== Arrests ===
On 4 June 2025, police announced they were suspending the search. On the same day, police arrested James Wood - who lived in the same house - over Bishop's disappearance.

On 5 June 2025, police arrested both housemates, Wood and Bromley, and charged each with one count of murder and two counts of interfering with a corpse. They had previously been charged with unrelated weapons charges after firearms and ammunition were found in their car and home.

On 1 July, a third person, Kieran Daniel Mittelheuser, was arrested in connection with Bishop's alleged murder, having used her phone to interfere with the investigation.

=== Remains discovered ===
On 6 June, police located human remains following the search of a back road surrounded by dense bushland near Goodnight Scrub National Park. On 17 June, Police released confirmation that the remains found were identified as belonging to Pheobe Bishop. The remains were found 'not too far' from the original search area and did not appear to have been buried. Bishop's luggage and phone have not been located.

== Criminal proceedings ==
On 6 June 2025, Wood's and Bromley's criminal matters were mentioned at Bundaberg Magistrates Court. Both Wood and Bromley were remanded into custody until their next court appearance set for 11 August 2025.

Police allege that Bishop was killed soon after she was spotted by CCTV on Airport Drive. They allege that her body was moved twice, first on 15 May, the day she disappeared, and again two days later.

== See also ==
- List of solved missing person cases (post-2000)
