= Ian Miles =

Australian rules footballer (1952–2025)

Personal information
- Full name: Ian William Miles
- Born: 15 October 1952
- Died: 9 January 2025 (aged 72); Melbourne, Victoria, Australia
- Original team: Essex Heights
- Height: 183 cm (6 ft 0 in)
- Weight: 71 kg (157 lb)

Playing career^{1}
Years	Club	Games (Goals)
1971–72	Richmond	4 (0)
- ^{1} Playing statistics correct to the end of 1972.

Ian Miles (15 October 1952 – 9 January 2025) was an Australian rules footballer who played with Richmond in the Victorian Football League (VFL). He died in Melbourne on 9 January 2025, at the age of 72.
