= Perri Cutten =

Australian fashion designer (1952–2025)

- Born: 1952
- Died: 4 April 2025 (aged 73); Melbourne, Victoria, Australia
- Occupation: Fashion designer
- Years active: 1981–2025

Perri Cutten (1952 – 4 April 2025) was an Australian fashion designer.

== Early life ==
Born in 1952, Cutten launched her eponymous brand in Melbourne in 1981. The following year, her first boutique was established in Armadale, Victoria. She focused on making office-wear for women.

Cutten died at home in Melbourne, on 4 April 2025, at the age of 73.
