= Oscar Jenkins =

Australian volunteer

Oscar Jenkins is an Australian teacher. He volunteered to fight for Ukraine during the Russian invasion and was taken prisoner by Russian forces. In December 2024, videos posted on social media showed him being questioned and struck repeatedly by a Russian interrogator. On 14 January 2025, reports emerged that Jenkins had been killed. Australian Prime Minister Anthony Albanese promised the "strongest action possible" against Russia if the death of Jenkins was confirmed. Leader of the opposition Peter Dutton called for Russia's ambassador to Australia to be expelled if Jenkins had been executed.

On 29 January 2025, Australian Foreign Minister Penny Wong stated that Jenkins was alive in Russian custody.

On 31 August 2026, the Australian Broadcasting Corporation (the Australian Government Broadcaster) reported that Oscar Jenkins had been interviewed by Vladivostok based Australian born Mark Lowe inside a Russian Prison.

== Background ==
Oscar Jenkins was born in Melbourne and graduated from Melbourne Grammar School, where he was vice-captain, in 2010. He was a member of the Toorak Prahran Cricket Club and studied biomedical sciences at Monash University. In 2015, Jenkins left Australia to work as a lecturer at Tianjin College in China. Jenkins was also a vegan activist and a youtuber; he made both serious and comedic youtube videos, no longer publicly visible, many of them linked to his interest in veganism, and books he'd read about veganism.

== Ukrainian International Legion ==
He joined the International Legion in 2024 following the Russian invasion of Ukraine and had been fighting in the Donbas region. Jenkins served in the 402nd Separate Rifle Battalion, part of the 66th Mechanized Brigade, according to reports.

== Capture and sentence ==
In December 2024, video was released showing that Jenkins had been captured by Russian forces. The date of Jenkins' capture is unknown, with some reports that he may have been missing for months. The footage, which showed Jenkins being slapped and taunted, was condemned by the Australian government. A government spokesperson said that Russia must "comply with international legal obligations and ensure Mr Jenkins' welfare". Russian Ambassador Alexey Pavlovsky was summoned to meet with Australian officials after the video was released.

On 14 January 2025, reports emerged that Jenkins had been killed while held prisoner by Russia. A sergeant who had served with Jenkins reported that he had been "executed" and that he may have been subjected to torture. The Australian government reported that it was working to verify reports of Jenkins' death.

On 29 January 2025, Australian Foreign Minister Penny Wong stated that Jenkins was alive, saying "The Australian government has received confirmation from Russia that Oscar Jenkins is alive and in custody". She also said "We have made clear to Russia in Canberra and in Moscow that Mr Jenkins is a prisoner of war and Russia is obligated to treat him in accordance with international humanitarian law”.

In February, a video apparently of Jenkins alive in Russian captivity became available on YouTube, suggesting he had had a broken arm. Australian Prime Minister Anthony Albanese said the video appeared to confirm that Jenkins was alive, and expressed concern for his welfare.

In May 2025, Jenkins was sentenced to 13 years in jail, to be served at a maximum-security penal colony. The trial generated significant controversy, as Jenkins was charged with being a mercenary, allowing Russia to prosecute him under their criminal code rather than treating him as a prisoner of war. Australian Foreign Affairs Minister Penny Wong, in a statement, said the Australian Government was "appalled", calling the sentencing a "sham trial".

== Reactions while reported to be dead ==
While at least seven Australians have been killed in combat in Ukraine, Jenkins was the first to be captured. He would have been the first Australian to be killed while a prisoner of war in over 70 years.

Australian Prime Minister Anthony Albanese vowed to take the "strongest action possible" if reports that Jenkins had been killed were confirmed, and said that the Australian government was seeking "urgent clarification" of Jenkins' status. Opposition leader Peter Dutton and foreign affairs spokesman Simon Birmingham called for the Russian ambassador to Australia to be expelled if Jenkins' death was confirmed. Foreign Minister Penny Wong confirmed that the expulsion of Russian diplomats was "on the table". The Russian Embassy did not comment on reports of Jenkins' death, and pointed to a 25 December statement in which a spokesperson said that Russia was "checking information on the detained Australian citizen".

== See also ==
- Prisoners of war in the Russian invasion of Ukraine
