= Mount Isa Murders =

1978 triple murder in Mount Isa, Queensland, Australia

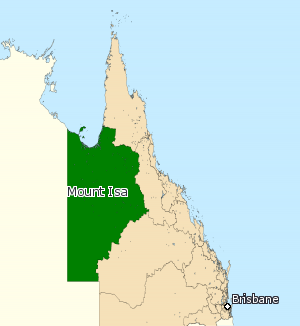
Mount Isa area in North-West Queensland, Australia

The Mount Isa Murders, also known as the Spear Creek Killings, took place 12 km (7.5 mi) from the small North Queensland town of Mount Isa at Spear Creek. While there have been a number of other murders, the term "Mount Isa Murders" here refers to the Spear Creek Killings. This triple murder took place in October 1978 and remained unsolved until an arrest was made in April 2019.

== History of the area ==
The Mount Isa area has a history of murders and unsolved crimes. Historically, the Mount Isa area was a region of economic and social instability. In the 1930s, entrepreneurs seeking economic gain from mining and farming land in the area caused significant social change. The introduction of a class structure disrupted the social balance of the area. These social structures were a fundamental influence on the type of crimes that were committed. During the Depression and World War II, itinerant workers entered the Mount Isa area in large numbers, increasing crime rates significantly. Thefts and violent crime greatly increased. It was a time of social, political and economic pressure. There were tensions between social groups, mining and farming industries, and classes.

== The Spear Creek Killings ==
Karen Edwards (23) and her partner, Tim Thomson (31), and his friend Gordon Twaddle (21) were on a motorcycle expedition through central Australia. Edwards was a trainee medical psychologist from Dandenong, whereas Thomson was a teacher and Twaddle a pastry cook. Both men were New Zealanders who had been in Australia for less than two years.

The trio was travelling from Alice Springs towards Cairns and then Melbourne. Edwards and Thomson rode on a red and gold 1977 BMW 100S with a homemade sidecar which carried their gear and 9-month-old Doberman. Twaddle rode a blue 1977 Suzuki GS750 with a racing cowling.

The distinctive group were last seen on 5 October 1978, in the Moondarra Caravan Park in Mount Isa. Witnesses had earlier seen the group accompanied by a third motorcyclist, and later by an unidentified bearded man in a 4WD (a brown-and-white Toyota Land Cruiser) on their last day.

=== Killings ===
Edwards was found shot dead 12 km (7.5 mi) north of Mount Isa near Spear Creek on the morning of 24 October 1978. The body was discovered by a local resident, Stan Harris, while with his wife exercising their greyhounds. He found her body sprawled against a tree. The following morning, police found the bodies of Thomson and Twaddle, nearby and similarly positioned.

=== Police investigation ===
The victims had been stripped of identification, and investigators initially thought they were hitchhikers. Four detectives were injured when a helicopter, hired to search the site, crash landed. One week after the discovery, Edwards’ father came forward after identifying his daughter’s watch in a newspaper report.

The 4WD man quickly became a suspect, with sightings of both him and his vehicle in several locations around the time of the murders. He was never found and his identity remains unknown.

The original investigation focused on linking the triple murder to other murders at the time. The murder of John Tzelaidis in July 1978 in Dampier, Western Australia was originally thought to be associated with the murders. Ivan Milat was later also a person of interest. There is little public information on the original investigation, and a suspect was never identified or charged.

In 2018, detectives from the Cold Case Investigation Team along with the Mount Isa Criminal Investigation Branch launched a review of the unsolved triple homicide. This included a review of the information provided by witnesses over the years. In March 2019, a new appeal was made by police, urging anyone with information regarding the murders to come forward. These appeals led to almost 50 leads in the span of a week. Police revealed that while some of these contained information they already had, there were some new leads.

==== Suspect ====
On 12 April 2019, the Homicide Cold Case Investigation Team arrested a 63-year-old Goulburn man and former prison guard, Bruce John Preston, on three counts of murder. Preston was known to the victims, and he was originally interviewed by police in 1977 after they found him in possession of the BMW. Preston had the stolen motorcycle cleaned, the wheels changed, and parts removed. In 1978, he was convicted of theft of the vehicle and fined $300. He maintained that he had simply found the motorcycle.

Preston was also on a motorcycle trip across Australia at this time. Witnesses saw a man matching Preston's description with the victims the night prior to their murder. The friends were last seen entering a brown Toyota Land Cruiser. At the time, Preston's father owned a car similar to this description.

Detective Senior Sergeant Tara Kentwell stated that little was known regarding Preston's motives. Preston's lawyer appeared in court on behalf of the accused in April 2019, stating that his client denied being in Mount Isa at the time of the murders and would be appealing the charges. His claim contradicted by an earlier statement in an interview prior to his arrest when he stated that he was in Mount Isa when the three friends went missing. Preston remained in custody and was later permitted to apply for bail.

Despite this progress in the 2019 investigation, police continued to look for any further information regarding the killings, and offered indemnity from prosecution for any accomplice who can provide insight. A reward of $250,000 is currently being offered.

In July 2023, charged against Preston were dropped.

=== Timeline ===
- 30 September 1978: Edwards arrived in Alice Springs where she met up with Thomson and Twaddle before they rode north.
- 2 October: The trio started their trip. They stopped at Aileron where they camped overnight.
- 3 October: The friends made four stops at Wauchope, Devils Marbles, The Three Ways, and Frewena before they camped overnight in the Barry Caves. Between The Three Ways and Frewena, they met up with another male motorcyclist who travelled on with them to their campsite.
- 4 October: It is believed this male continued to travel with the friends until they reached Moondarra Caravan Park, where the trio and their dog checked in for two nights. That evening, another unidentified man driving a brown and white Toyota Land Cruiser joined the friends at the campsite.
- 5 October: The trio were last seen leaving the caravan park in the morning in the 4WD. Late that afternoon, the driver hastily packed up the camp and bikes and took Thomson's Doberman, Tristie.
- 6 October: Tristie was found abandoned at the Mount Isa Dump. She was later euthanised before the victims were discovered.
- 16 October: Twaddle’s motorbike was found abandoned in Mt Isa.
- 24 October: The body of Edwards is discovered.
- 25 October: The other bodies are found.
- 30 October: The possessions of the victims were found dumped in some of the barrels bordering the Mount Isa Dump. This was next to where the dog was found.
- 13 November: Thomson’s motorcycle is located in a raid on Preston’s garage. A 4WD and rifles are also impounded.
