= Twinnies (duo) =

German musical duo

- Origin: Neufang, Bavaria, Germany
- Genres: rock, pop, volksmusik
- Labels: Ariola (Sony BMG)
- Past members: Astrid Paster; Franziska Pauli

Twinnies was a musical duo from Bavaria consisting of Astrid Paster and Franziska Pauli. They were noted for singing and playing their accordions while rollerblading.

== Biography ==
Astrid Paster and Franziska Pauli lived in the small Bavarian village of Neufang, which had only 40 inhabitants. They played guitar and steirische harmonikas since childhood. They said that they were such good friends that they could be considered twins.

The duo demonstrated the unique talent of performing while rollerblading. They explained: "The idea came about by accident. We used to perform music in the evenings at Astrid's father's health resort hotel, and [once] while we were out on rollerskates in the middle of the day, the guests asked us to take our accordions out". It was at that hotel that they were discovered by DJ Ötzi's producer Christian Seitz. As he said, "[t]he girls were so brilliant that I signed them the same evening".

On 6 March 2009, the Twinnies (then aged 12 and 13) released their debut album Wir rocken auf Rollen ("We Rock on Rolls") on Sony BMG. The album contained songs written for them by DJ Ötzi's producers Seitz and Martin Neumeyer. Franciska explained: "We told the two which topics we would like to sing about. That included our passion for long talks, as well as fashion and karaoke parties".

On 7 March 2009, they debuted on television, on the ARD folk music program Musikantenstadl. Their performance (with accordions on rollerblades) brought them instant fame. A video of the duo on that day's show (they sang a song "Bayernmädels" from their debut album) is now popular on YouTube, having attracted over 14 million views by the end of 2017.

== Members ==
The members of the group were:

- Astrid Paster (born May 20, 1996)
- Franziska Pauli (born November 24, 1995)

== Discography ==
=== Studio albums ===
Title	Album details	Charts
Title	Album details	AUT
Wir rocken auf Rollen	Released: 6 March 2009; Label: Sony BMG; Format(s): CD	64
