= 2025 Western Australian local elections =

- 18 October 2025

The 2025 Western Australian local elections were held on 18 October 2025 to elect representatives to each of the local governments in Western Australia.

== Background ==
In Western Australia, elections are held every 2 years to elect half of all councils. In September 2025, there were reports of issues with postal vote packages.

== Turnout ==
The voter turnout was reportedly low, with around 29.7% of enrolled voters voting, down from 31.2% in 2023. Premier Roger Cook has raised the prospect of compulsory voting for local government.

== Controversies ==
A few self described Neo Nazis ran in the election, notably Stephen Wells in Busselton and Samuel Croll in Mosman Park

== Candidates ==
Up to 40 Labor candidates ran, several Liberal. The Greens ran candidates in several districts including Vincent Victoria Park, the newly formed Socialist Party ran candidates all across the Perth Metro Area. One Nation ran candidates in Swan and other districts the Australian Christians put up a candidate for Mayor of City of Rockingham.

== See also ==
- 2025 Western Australian state election
