= Colin MacNeil (footballer) =

Australian rules footballer (1936–2025)

Colin McNeil

Personal information
- Born: 5 August 1936
- Died: 16 January 2025 (aged 88); Australia
- Height: 197 cm (6 ft 6 in)
- Weight: 96 kg (212 lb)

Playing career^{1}
Years	Club	Games (Goals)
1959–60	Fitzroy	8 (9)
- ^{1} Playing statistics correct to the end of 1960.

Colin McNeil (5 August 1936 – 16 January 2025) was an Australian rules footballer who played with Fitzroy in the Victorian Football League (VFL). He died on 16 January 2025, at the age of 88.
