= Death of Elizabeth Struhs =

Incident in 2022 in Queensland, Australia

On the night of 6 January 2022, 8-year-old Elizabeth Struhs died of diabetic ketoacidosis at her home in Toowoomba, Queensland, Australia. Her family, members of a religious sect known as the "Saints", deliberately withdrew insulin from Elizabeth due to a belief that God would intervene to save her life.

== Background ==
In 2005, Kerrie Struhs became a member of a Christian religious sect called the "Saints".

In 2019, Elizabeth Struhs became extremely ill over a six-day period. On the sixth day, Jason Struhs took Elizabeth to hospital, where she fell into a coma. Elizabeth survived and was diagnosed with type 1 diabetes, and Jason and Kerrie Struhs were convicted of failing to provide the necessities of life. Kerrie was sentenced to an 18-month prison sentence but only served five months in jail. Jason was sentenced to six months in prison, but his sentence was suspended as he had eventually brought Elizabeth to hospital and had testified against Kerrie during the case.

On 21 August 2021, Jason Struhs was baptised and inducted into the Saints.

== Death ==
Kerrie Struhs returned home from jail on 16 December 2021. On New Year's Day 2022, Jason Struhs ceased administering Elizabeth rapid-acting insulin and stopped giving her slow-release insulin in the days following. Elizabeth's health deteriorated over the next six days, and the members of the Saints prayed and sang for her to be miraculously cured by God.

Sometime during the night of 6 January 2022, Elizabeth died of diabetic ketoacidosis. Upon discovering Elizabeth's body, members of the Saints covered her with a blanket and began praying for her to be raised from the dead. The Saints also texted each other to come to the Struhs' house to pray for Elizabeth's resurrection. On 8 January, Jason Struhs called emergency services to report Elizabeth's death. The decision to contact emergency services was, according to one member of the Saints, in order to make more people see Elizabeth's body so that more people would be amazed when she rose from the dead.

== Court proceedings ==
During the court case, Crown Prosecutor Caroline Marco stated that Elizabeth's death was preventable and that she would not rise from the dead, prompting laughter from the defendants.

== Sentencing ==
All the defendants did not enter a plea, and a plea of Not Guilty was entered for them by the judge. Fourteen members of the Saints were convicted of manslaughter, and sentenced over the death:

Defendant	Age	Role	Sentence
Jason Struhs	53	Elizabeth's father	14 years
Brendan Stevens	63	Leader of the Saints	13 years
Kerrie Struhs	49	Elizabeth's mother	14 years
Zachary Struhs	22	Elizabeth's brother	6 years
Loretta Mary Stevens	67	Brendan's wife	9 years
Andrea Louise Stevens	34		7 years
Acacia Naree Stevens	31		7 years
Camellia Claire Stevens	28		7 years
Therese Maria Stevens	37		7 years
Keita Courtney Martin	22		7 years
Lachlan Stuart Schoenfisch	34		7 years
Samantha Emily Schoenfisch, née Crouch	26		6 years
Sebastian James Stevens	23		7 years
Alexander Francis Stevens	26		7 years

== Reactions ==
The case made international news.
