= Rodney Francis Cameron =

Australian serial killer (1952–2025)

Rodney Francis Cameron (1952 – 19 April 2025), also known as Rodney Mallard, commonly referred to in media as the Lonely Hearts Killer, was an Australian serial killer who murdered several women during the 1970s and the 1990s.

== Crimes ==
In 1974, Cameron was arrested for the murder of two people , Florence Edith Jackson, 49, whom he killed following the loss of his job as a trainee nurse. Following the murder, he fled to Victoria and murdered 19-year-old hitchhiker Francesco Ciliberto. Following his release, Cameron received a life sentence, following the murder of 44-year-old Maria Goellner. Cameron lured Goellner to an Inn at Katoomba, New South Wales by using a radio matchmaking show.

== Death ==
Cameron died from cancer at the Prince of Wales Hospital in Sydney, on 19 April 2025, at the age of 72.
