= Colin Burdett =

Australian basketball player (1931–2025)

Personal information
- Full name: Colin James Burdett
- Nationality: Australian
- Born: 4 January 1931
- Died: 2 March 2025 (aged 94); Adelaide, South Australia

Sport
- Sport: Basketball

Colin James Burdett (4 January 1931 – 2 March 2025) was an Australian basketball player. He competed in the men's tournament at the 1956 Summer Olympics. Burdett died on 2 March 2025, at the age of 94.
