= Ally Fashion =

Australian women's fast fashion retailer

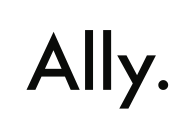
- Type: Private
- Industry: Fashion retail
- Founded: 2001; 25 years ago
- Headquarters: Sydney, Australia
- Number of locations: 156
- Area served: Australia
- Key people: Anne-Marie Wade (CEO)
- Products: Clothing, accessories
- Website: allyfashion.com

Ally Fashion is an Australian women's fast fashion retailer. The company commenced operation in 2001 as a wholesaler launching its first store in Macarthur Square, Sydney. Ally Fashion had more than 100 physical stores throughout Australia and is also focused on online fashion retail.

In 2025 it was compulsorily placed into liquidation and closed a third of the stores, but it was then placed under deed of company arrangement, cleanly exiting liquidation.

== History ==
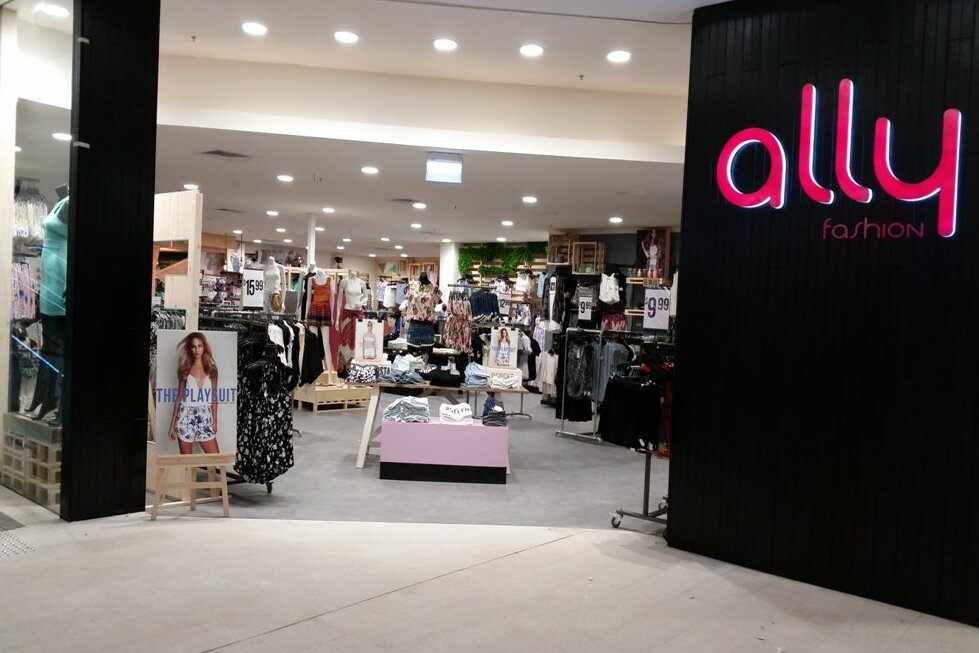
Ally Fashion store in Warnbro

Founded in 2001, Ally Fashion have over 100 stores across Australia and an online store.

In 2018, Ally Fashion launched a curvy line called You & All. In 2020, the company launched a maternity and childrenswear line called Mummy and Me.

In September 2021, Ally Fashion launched a menswear brand called AM Supply.

In March 2025, Ally Fashion was declared insolvent and ordered to be wound-up by the Federal Court of Australia, following a referral from a property group over unpaid rent backed up by other creditors. BDO Sydney was appointed liquidator. The liquidation process resulted in the closure of 50 Ally Fashion stores. Four months later, in July 2025, control of the company was returned back to the company's director, after creditors accepted a deed of company arrangement.

== Products ==
Ally Fashion sells women's fashion trend items such as: dresses, tops, basics, skirts, shorts, denim, outerwear and accessories.

== Stores ==
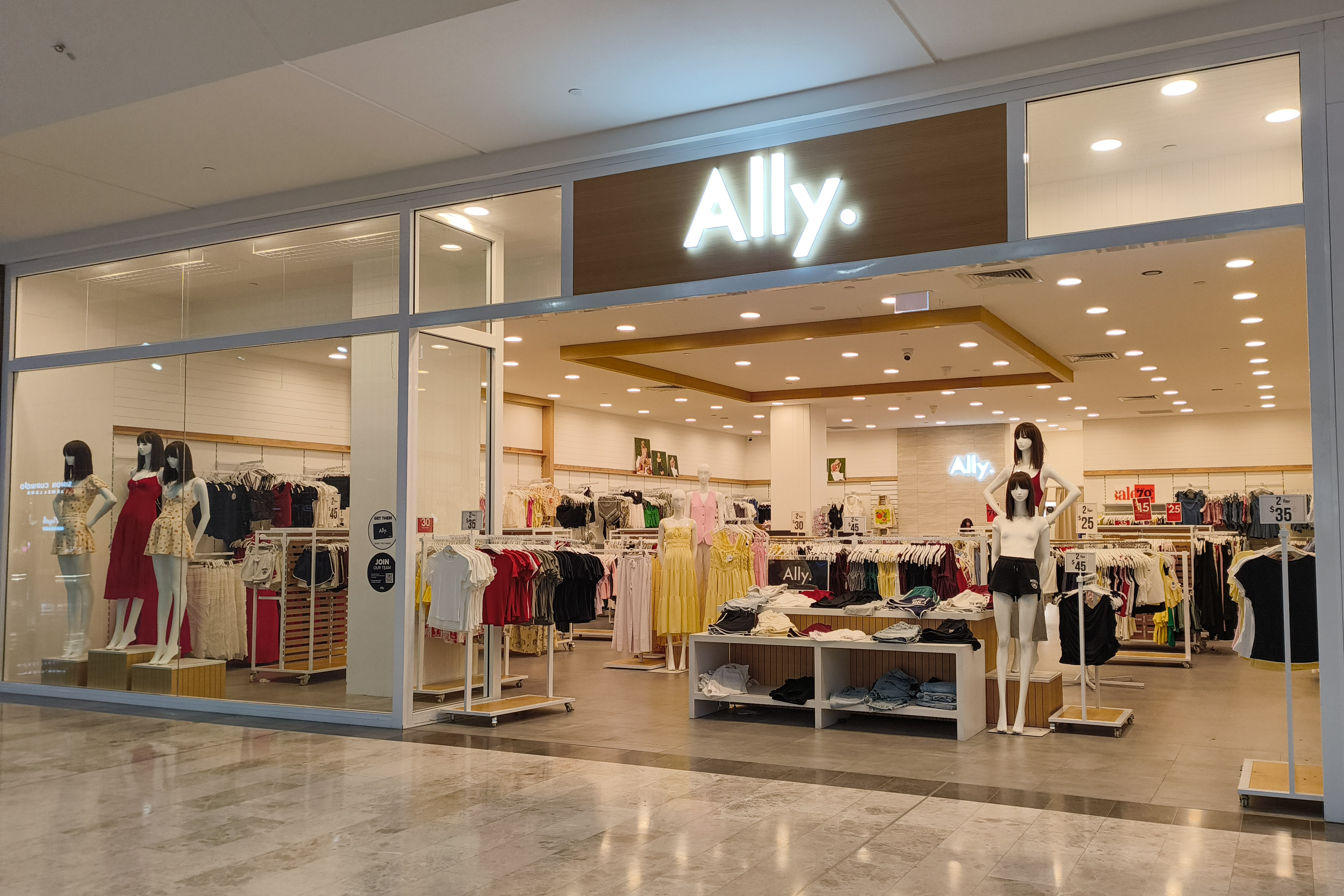
Ally Fashion store in Westfield Carousel

Ally Fashion has over 100 stores across Darwin, Queensland, New South Wales, Australian Capital Territory, Victoria, South Australia, Western Australia and Tasmania. Ally Fashion online store is also available internationally with shipping available worldwide.
