= Doug Ringholt =

Australian rules footballer (1942–2025)

Personal information
- Full name: Douglas Stuart Ringholt
- Born: 8 September 1942; Brunswick, Victoria, Australia
- Died: April 2025 (aged 82)
- Original team: West Coburg
- Height: 179 cm (5 ft 10 in)
- Weight: 74 kg (163 lb)

Playing career
Years	Club	Games (Goals)
1963–64	Carlton	4 (0)
1965–70	Claremont	114 (2)
Total		118 (2)

Douglas Stuart Ringholt (8 September 1942 – April 2025) was an Australian rules footballer who played with Carlton in the Victorian Football League (VFL) and Claremont in the West Australian Football League (WAFL). Ringholt died in April 2025, at the age of 82.
