= Adam Burton (baseball) =

Australian baseball player (1972–2025)

Personal information
- Born: 17 March 1972 Melbourne, Victoria, Australia
- Died: 12 May 2025 (aged 53)

Sport
- Country: Australia
- Sport: Baseball

Adam Burton (17 March 1972 – 12 May 2025) was an Australian baseball player. He represented Australia at the 2000 Summer Olympics. Burton also played for the Melbourne Reds in the 1997–98 season. Burton died on 12 May 2025, at the age of 53.
