= Goodnight Scrub National Park =

National park in Queensland, Australia

- IUCN category II (national park)
- Location within Queensland
- Location: Queensland
- Coordinates: 25°13′19″S 151°55′12″E
- Area: 63.30 km^{2} (24.44 sq mi)
- Governing body: Queensland Parks and Wildlife Service
- Website: Official website

Goodnight Scrub is a national park in Queensland, Australia, 274 km northwest of Brisbane. It is located in the locality of Good Night which is split between the Bundaberg Region and the North Burnett Region local government areas, but is predominantly in the Bundaberg Region part of the locality. The park covers an area of 66.7 square kilometres (25.8 sq mi) of land within the Burnett River water catchment and the South East Queensland bioregions. At the southern extent of the park is the Paradise Dam.

Goodnight Scrub National Park protects dry rainforest predominated by hoop pine. At least five rare or threatened species have been identified in the park.

Camping is not permitted in the park. No walking tracks are provided, however there are fire trails.

The elevation of the terrain is 154 metres.

== See also ==
- Protected areas of Queensland
