= Paula and Bridgette Powers =

Australian identical twins and wildlife carers

Paula Powers and Bridgette Powers (born 1974), known as The Twinnies, are Australian identical twin sisters who operate Twinnies Pelican and Seabird Rescue, a nonprofit organization in Landsborough, Queensland. They have received attention for their work with injured birds, and for their very close and overlapping speech patterns, the latter going viral following a 2025 interview about a carjacking both witnessed.

== Biography ==
=== Early life and conservation work ===
Born in 1974 on the Sunshine Coast, the pair experienced developmental delays from birth and were sent to an institution at age two before their parents, Helen and John, eventually got them out and raised Paula and Bridgette alongside their six other siblings. The two of them spoke in their own language from a young age and were often separated by teachers because they believed the pair were cheating. They dropped out of high school due to health problems, and they developed an interest in wildlife conservation, influenced by their coastal environment and early work at Australia Zoo. The pair met Steve Irwin in a chance encounter after helping a green sea turtle who had been stranded on a beach. After meeting he offered them a job at the Australia Zoo.

Their rescue organization, established in the late 1990s, focuses on rehabilitating injured seabirds, such as pelicans, kookaburras, and darters, with thousands of birds treated across 187 species. The facility faced financial challenges in 2023 but was supported by donations, including a 2025 GoFundMe campaign. The twins work with veterinarians and conservationists, earning recognition for treating complex injuries.

=== Association with Cliff Young ===
During the 1990s and early 2000s, the Powers family formed a close relationship with ultra-marathon runner Cliff Young. Following the decline of his health and his divorce, Young moved into the Powers family home in Beerwah, Queensland, where he lived for the final years of his life.

While the twins were children and teenagers during this period, they acted as Young's support crew during his later races, often running alongside him to keep his spirits up. Their mother, Helen Powers, acted as Young's manager and primary carer. Young died of cancer at the Powers' residence in November 2003.

=== Media prominence ===
The sisters are noted for their synchronized speech and identical appearance, which have attracted media attention. The Twinnies gained renewed media attention through a 2016 Good Morning Britain interview and a 2025 7News Queensland segment about a carjacking incident on Steve Irwin Way, where their mother confronted an armed suspect. The 2025 interview, in which they discussed the incident while wearing matching outfits, went viral due to their synchronized speech, incidentally boosting awareness of their conservation work. Their efforts, addressing threats to Australian seabirds from pollution and habitat loss, have been documented in outlets like ABC News and Australian Story.
