= 10 Years Younger =

10 Years Younger may refer to:

- 10 Years Younger (British TV series), a Channel Four makeover show since 2004
- 10 Years Younger (American TV series), a TLC makeover show 2004—2009
- 10 Years Younger in 10 Days, an Australian Seven Network makeover show since 2009
