= Meredith Jones (author) =

Australian cultural theorist (born 1965)

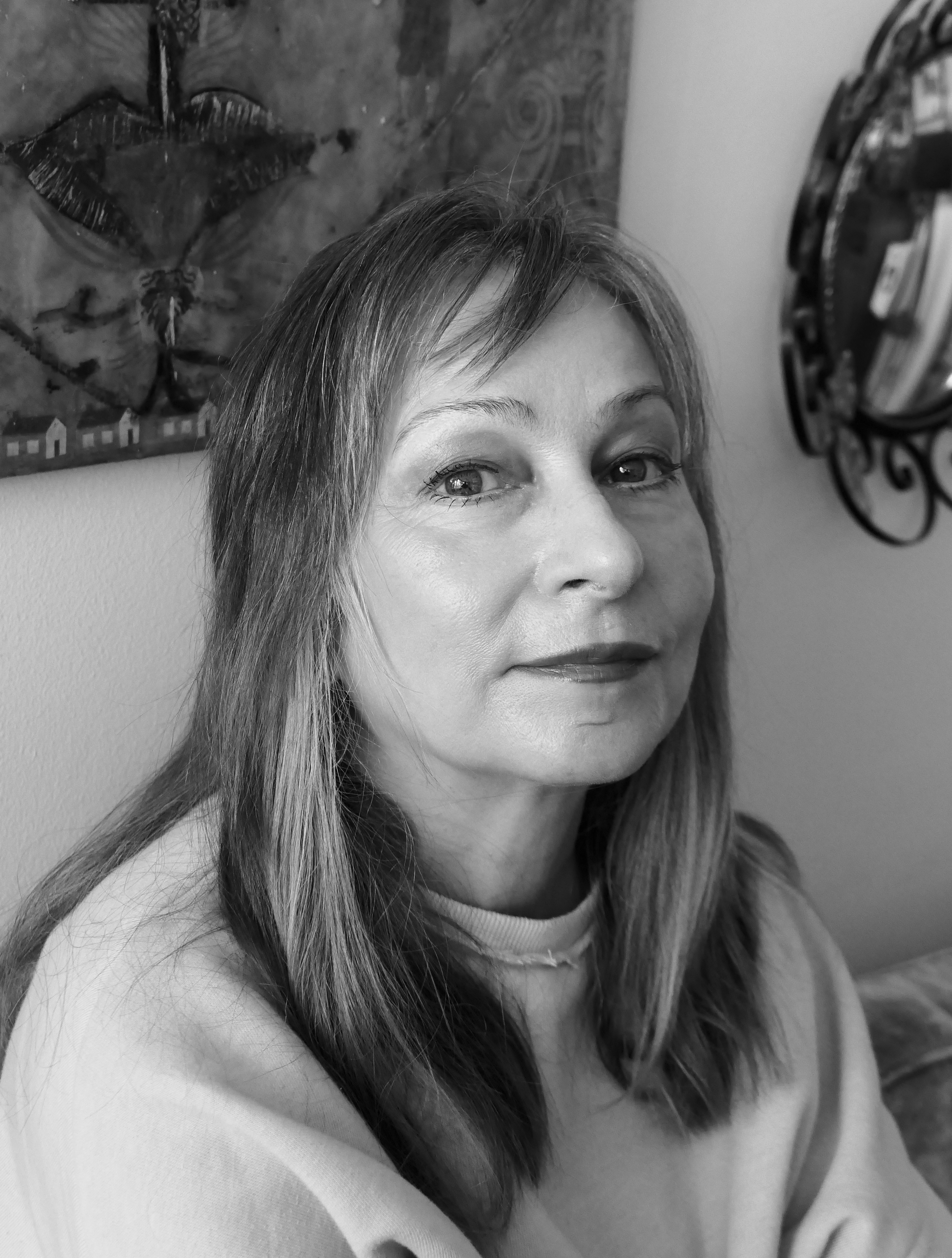
Prof. Meredith Jones

Meredith Rachael Jones (born 1965) is an Australian cultural theorist, currently employed at Brunel University London as Professor in Arts and Humanities, and as the director of its Institute of Communities and Society.

== Education and academic career ==
Meredith Rachael Jones was born in 1965. She took a pass degree in Arts from the University of Melbourne, and upgraded this to a first-class honours degree in gender studies under Elspeth Probyn at the University of Sydney in 1998. Taking a position at the University of Technology, Sydney teaching media studies, Jones earned a Graduate Diploma in Communications and began studying for her doctorate. Her PhD project was supervised by Zoë Sofoulis in the Centre for Cultural Research at the University of Western Sydney and was completed in 2006. Parts of her doctoral work were published in the academic journals Continuum: Journal of Media & Cultural Studies, Space and Culture: International Journal of Social Spaces, and Social Semiotics, and contributed to her first book. Together with her supervisor, Jones contributed a chapter to the book The Cyborg Experiments: The Extensions of the Body in the Media Age, examining the work of Stelarc and Orlan.

In 2015, Jones became a Reader in gender and media studies, as well as the Director of the Research Centre for Global Lives, in the College of Business, Arts and Social Sciences at Brunel University London. In 2022, she became full Professor and the inaugural Director of the Institute of Communities and Society.

== Academic research ==
Jones describes her research as occurring "at the intersections of media theory, gender studies, and cultural studies." Her research has explored cosmetic surgery and the phenomenon of cosmetic surgery tourism, popular culture through the lens of feminist theory, and empowerment and visualisation of bodies. Her PhD thesis was titled Makeover Culture: Landscapes of Cosmetic Surgery Language and explored surgical makeovers as a cultural phenomenon. Skintight: An Anatomy of Cosmetic Surgery, her first book, was published in 2008. It "argues that cosmetic surgery is the most provocative and controversial aspect of a new 'makeover culture'" with direct connections to reality television programs that "demonstrate that 'fixing' the body is a way to improve lifestyle and uncover true identity", citing examples including 10 Years Younger (United States and United Kingdom versions) and Extreme Makeover.

=== Body visualisation / empowerment ===
Jones has researched how human bodies are portrayed, how we visualise our own bodies, and how these are culturally influenced; she explored this topic in Skintight. She has examined the cultural impact of the availability of graphics-editing software such as Photoshop, which have problematised the ideal of photography as a means to capture an accurate and authentic representation of reality. Digital manipulation of images is now so frequent as to have become "an integral part of the performance of public life" and Jones argues that we now inhabit "media-bodies". Jones introduced this term in an earlier study examining the expansion of reality television coverage to including cosmetic surgery. Camille Nurka picked up the term in her book Female Genital Cosmetic Surgery, noting that "cosmetic surgery can approximate the effect of digital airbrushing to make us look less disappointingly human and more like ageless plastic". Nurka linked the concept to objectification theory, developed by Barbara Fredrickson and Tomi-Ann Roberts and referring to "the experience of being treated as a body (or collection of body parts) valued predominantly for its use to (or consmuption by) others," and used it as a basis for an extended discussion of self-objectification.

Jones has also explored popular understandings of vaginas and vulvas, referring to the result of labiaplasty as a "Designer Vagina." She contends that societal attitudes are changing in a way that sees skin as a surface that is increasingly being considered for its visually expressiveness, causing it to take on screen-like properties. At the same time, there is a growing trend for screens to be more affective. The interplay is leading in Jones' view to "two-dimensional images and three-dimensional 'real life' bodies ... blending in ways that parallel skin–screen mergers." Nurka also explored this concept, noting that Jones is describing a world "where people wish they could be Photoshopped in real life and where scalpels can be aligned with digital tools," and comparing Jones work with her own previous argument that the "surgically altered genitals-without-labia are a post-human phenomenon in a world in which we strive to leave the messy, hairy business of the biological body behind". Jones interest in this area extends to being involved in the founding of the Vagina Museum, which aims to reduce the stigma and shame surrounding gynaecological anatomy and to confront what the British Society for Paediatric and Adolescent Gynaecology has described as the "unrealistically narrow representations of vulval appearance in popular culture". The Museum will be a world-first when it opens in London, and Jones is a member of its advisory board.

=== Cosmetic surgery ===
Jones was one of the four co-investigators on the Sea, Sand, Sun and Silicone project, along with David Bell (Professor of Cultural Geography at the University of Leeds), Elspeth Probyn (Professor of Gender and Cultural Studies at the University of Sydney, and Jones' supervisor in her BA(Honours) project) and Jacqueline Sanchez Taylor (Lecturer in Sociology, the University of Leicester), with the team leader being Ruth Holliday (Professor of Gender and Culture, the University of Leeds). The project examined reasons for travelling overseas to seek cosmetic surgery (so-called cosmetic surgery tourism, a kind of medical tourism) from Australia and the United Kingdom from the perspectives of patients, medical practitioners and carers, and tourist agents and guides. The project produced both a preliminary and final report for the Economic and Social Research Council, a part of UK Research and Innovation. The work led to three journal articles and two book chapters with Jones as an author, plus three other publications and nine conference proceedings. The project team have also written a book, Beautyscapes: Mapping Cosmetic Surgery Tourism, which was published by Manchester University Press in June 2019.

The Sea, Sand, Sun and Silicone project has been written up by both by project members and discussed by mainstream media outlets, including in print by The Guardian and Therapy Today, on television in documentaries The Beauty Race, Change My Race, and The Nip Tuck Trip, and on BBC Radio 4, BBC Radio 5 Live, and ABC Radio National.

=== Popular culture ===
Jones has written articles about Keeping Up with the Kardashians for The Conversation and The Guardian newspapers, and in 2015 she organized "Kimposium," the world's first academic conference for scholarship on the Kardashians. She described the experience as having required her to "argue quite hard about the academic, social, and cultural significance of the Kardashians," and that she learned "too much about Twitter trolls who seem to hate academics and Kardashians in equal parts." The following year, she edited a Kardashian-themed edition of the journal Critical Studies in Fashion & Beauty (volume 7, issue 2), and wrote Je Suis Kim, the editorial for the issue. Jones is preparing a book about the Kardashians.

== Podcast ==
In 2023 Jones launched a podcast based on her research titled The Beauty Chronicles. In the podcast Jones discusses cosmetic surgery, media, popular culture, celebrity, and more. It is hosted on Spotify but also available on Apple Podcasts, Patreon, and YouTube

== Writings ==
Jones' first book was reviewed by Brenda Weber, Professor of Gender Studies at Indiana University Bloomington, who wrote in Women's Studies Quarterly about it and two other books: Self-Transformations: Foucault, Ethics, and Normalized Bodies by Cressida Heyes, and Surgery Junkies: Wellness and Pathology in Cosmetic Culture by Victoria Pitts-Taylor. Weber began by noting that elective plastic surgical procedures are growing in popularity, as are the number and styles of media representations of the associated transformations. Each of the three books present "studies that complement, rather than reproduce, one another", which Weber contends is an indication of the "breadth and fascination" of cosmetic surgery as a "topic [for] analysis" and academic study. Drawing on "representative samples from the current mediascape" and commenting on "television's role in making body-modification practices intelligible," each pays particular attention to the program Extreme Makeover. This ABC (America) program began in 2002 and led "the putsch for the extreme" that brought "a new level of self-reinvention [into the] mainstream [by turning] [w]hat had formerly been the preserve of Hollywood stars and the terminally rich [into] the new aspiration for those determined to change their image." Weber states that each of the books "succeeds in offering a useful and intelligent reading of plastic surgery as a cultural practice that speaks of and shapes our present contemporary moment, in which image functions as indexical to identity". Each author situates their analysis "within a broader theoretical context of feminism and cultural studies ... using a blended methodological approach [and] ... include complex schools of thought (such as postmodern and poststructural, Foucauldian, and actor–network theories)." Tomaž Krpič reviewed Skintight for Media International Australia, as did Meghan Griffin for the Journal of Popular Culture.

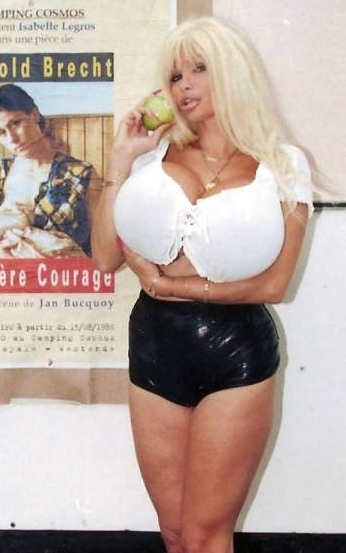
Lolo Ferrari, photographed in 1995

In an interview on ABC Radio National, Jones discussed Skintight and the cosmetic surgery choices made by women. She discussed the way in which cosmetic surgery operates at both ends of the mother / infant dyad, with most working "at making the appearance increasingly youthful: dermabrasions ideally create a baby-like skin, blepharoplasties widen the eyes, [and] lip enhancements give the mouth a perpetual baby pout." By contrast, breast augmentation emphasises the area that "most differentiates a woman from a child ... [as a] full bosom signifies fertile, sexualised adulthood and represents the opposite of childhood asexuality and innocence." The discussion explored the case of Lolo Ferrari, whose breast implants won her a Guinness World Record in 1999, and the way that breast augmentation can produce a costume that "might appear to represent fertile womanliness but in fact represent only themselves", resulting in what Ferrari herself described as "a femininity that's completely artificial." Niall Richardson and Adam Locks touch on Ferrari in their discussion of resistance to and conformity with cultural norms when using bodies as a means of self-expression, arguing that in "her exaggeration of the "ideal" female form, [Ferrari's] appearance is challenging – carnivalising – discourses of what is deemed erotic or desirable", and then refer to Jones' work as "an excellent analysis of Ferrari."

Her next book was Cosmetic Surgery: A Feminist Primer, which she jointly edited with Cressida Heyes, as well as contributing two chapters. The book was described by Richardson and Locks in their book Body Systems as "an excellent collection which has been assembled by two internationally respected scholars on body image" and reviewed in Gender and Society and in the e-journal Sextures.

Together with artist and designer Suzanne Boccalatte, Jones founded the Trunk series of books, which they edit. Books on Hair (reviewed in Fashion Theory: The Journal of Dress, Body & Culture) and Blood have been published by this imprint, and one of Breath is in development. Jones also edits the series Gender, Bodies and Transformation for Routledge.

== Personal life ==
Jones was inspired to pursue a career in academia from watching her mother study at La Trobe University as a mature age student after winning a scholarship. By the age of 30, Jones was separated and raising her daughter alone. Qualified with a pass degree, she was working in the scholarships office at the University of Sydney and assisting students with the administrative side of their PhD scholarships. It was this experience that fed her desire to earn a scholarship and do a PhD herself, which led Jones to seeking honours with Elspeth Probyn. After working for the University of Technology, Sydney and earning her PhD, Jones relocated to London in 2015. She enjoys attending organ concerts with her partner at Royal Festival Hall and is a vegan.

== Publications ==
The following table of shows Jones' publications with citation data collected from Google Scholar on 9 May 2019.

Year	Publication Type and Contribution	Title	Google Scholar Citations
2002	Book Chapter (Joint Author)	Stelarc and Orlan in the Middle Ages	8
2004	Journal Article (Sole Author)	Mutton Cut Up as Lamb: Mothers, Daughters and Cosmetic Surgery	25
2004	Journal Article (Sole Author)	Architecture of the Body: Cosmetic Surgery and Postmodern Space	13
2006	PhD Thesis (Sole Author)	Makeover Culture: Landscapes of Cosmetic Surgery Language	17
2008	Book (Sole Author)	Skintight: An Anatomy of Cosmetic Surgery	215
2008	Journal Article (Sole Author)	Makeover Culture's Dark Side: Breasts, Death and Lolo Ferrari	26
2008	Journal Article (Sole Author)	Media-Bodies and Screen-Births: Cosmetic Surgery Reality Television	49
2009	Book (Joint Editor)	Cosmetic Surgery: A Feminist Primer	79
2009	Book Chapter (Joint Author)	Cosmetic Surgery in the Age of Gender	32
2009	Book Chapter (Sole Author)	Pygmalion's Many Faces	11
2011	Journal Article (Joint Author)	Bikinis and Bandages: An Itinerary for Cosmetic Surgery Tourism	62
2011	Journal Article (Single Author)	Clinics of Oblivion: Makeover Culture and Cosmetic Surgery	15
2012	Journal Article (Single Author)	Cosmetic Surgery and the Fashionable Face	13
2013	Book Chapter (Sole Author)	Media-Bodies and Photoshop	17
2013	Book Chapter (Joint Author)	Beauty and the Beach: Mapping Cosmetic Surgery Tourism	14
2013	Book Chapter (Sole Author)	New Clothes, New Faces, New Bodies: Cosmetic Surgery and Fashion	–
2014	Journal Article (Joint Author)	Clinical Trails: Cosmetic Surgery Tourism	N/A
2014	Book Chapter (Joint Author)	Facebook and Facelifts: Communities of Cosmetic Surgery Tourists	N/A
2015	Journal Article (Joint Author)	Beautiful Face, Beautiful Place: Relational Geographies and Gender in Cosmetic Surgery Tourism Websites	31
2015	Journal Article (Joint Author)	Brief Encounters: Assembling Cosmetic Surgery Tourism	46
2015	Journal Article (Sole Author)	Sleep, Radical Hospitality, and Makeover's Anti-Matter	–
2016	Journal Article (Sole Author)	Je Suis Kim	1
2017	Journal Article (Sole Author)	Expressive Surfaces: The Case of the Designer Vagina	8
2019	Book (Joint Author)	Beautyscapes: Mapping Cosmetic Surgery Tourism	–
