= Jerome Krase =

American academic

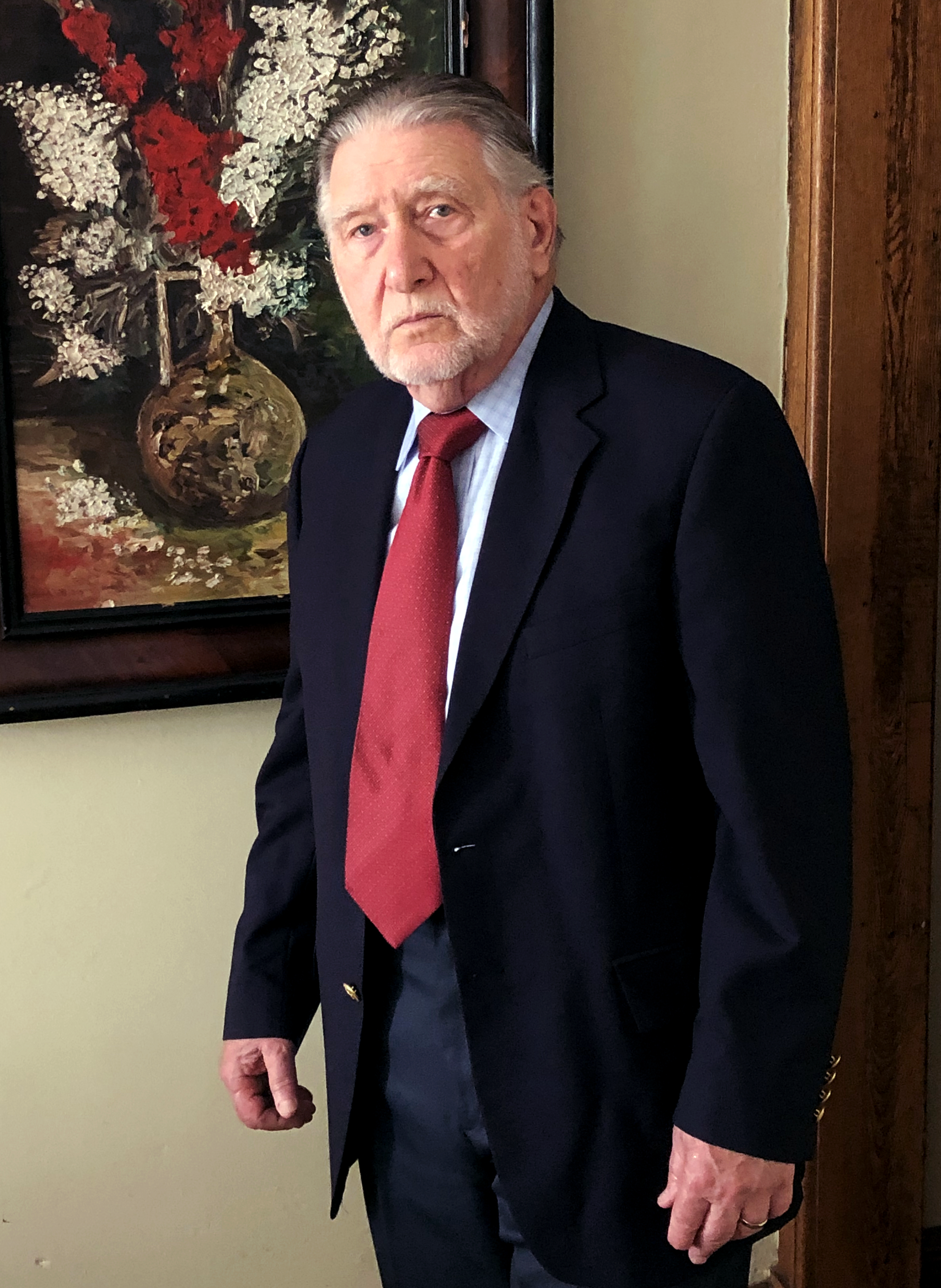
- Born: Jerome Krase; March 2, 1943 (age 83); Brooklyn, New York City, US.
- Education: Indiana University's Bloomington
- Occupations: Public figure; professor Emeritus of Sociology and Murray Koppelman. Professor at School of Humanities and Social Sciences. President of the European Academy of Sciences of Ukraine. Expert in sociology and gentrification

Jerome Krase (born March 2, 1943, in Brooklyn, New York City) is a professor emeritus of sociology at the Murray Koppelman School of Business, and professor at the School of Humanities and Social Sciences at Brooklyn College. He is also president of the European Academy of Sciences of Ukraine.

Krase is an expert in sociology and gentrification (ethnic groups and Italian-American politics, especially in Brooklyn and its neighborhood, culture, class, urban life, Urban culture, ethnicity and race in New York City). Krase is a public activist-scholar and serves as a consultant to public and private agencies regarding urban community issues. He is a co-editor of Urbanities, and an editorial board member of Visual Studies and CIDADES.

== Early life ==
Krase was born on March 2, 1943, in Brooklyn, New York. He calls himself an "authentic Brooklynite," like Bernie Sanders.

His father, Stephen Krase, was born in Trumbull, Connecticut, the son of Janos Hrasc and Elizabeth Valya who were Ruthenian (Rusyn) immigrants from Austro-Hungary. His mother, Martha Krase, was born in Brooklyn to Geralamo Cangelosi and Marie Trentacosta, who were immigrants from Marineo, Sicily. Stephen Krase had a series of working-class jobs, and Martha Krase was an assistant purchaser for the City of New York.

After graduating from Brooklyn Technical High School in 1960, Jerome went on to study at Indiana University Bloomington campus. In 1963–66 he volunteered and served in the US Army. After a three-year enlistment in the US Army, he earned a BA in Sociology, with minors in History and philosophy, in 1967. In 1973, Krase received his PhD in sociology at New York University. His Doctoral dissertation, "The Presentation of Community in Urban Society," dealt with the underserved stigmatization of a Black neighborhood in Brooklyn, thereby questioning unwarranted negative racial stereotypes in general.

== Academic career ==
Jerome Krase's Service to Brooklyn College and the university is exceptional as he has dedicated more than fifty years to the Brooklyn College of the CUNY. He twice chaired the Department of Sociology at Brooklyn College, served as Director of its Center for Italian American Studies, was on the advisory board of the CUNY Mexican Studies Institute, and was Founding Member, Officer, and board member, of the Academy of Humanities and Sciences of the City University of New York.

Professor Krase participated and organized different online scholarly meetings, roundtables, forums, seminars, and conferences. He is the author of numerous journalistic and scholarly published articles.

He took part in the discussion "What Images Teach Us," a Philadelphia Photo Arts Center webinar – "Finding Focus In Times of Crisis" (2020), and presented "Life in the Time of Covid-19 in a Hyper-Super-Gentrified Neighbourhood".

In 2020, he was a speaker at the International interdisciplinary online conferences "City as a Classroom," "Sketch a subculture", and "Real Life and Real Economics" organized by the Academy of Sciences of Ukraine.

Dr. Krase has also contributed to video documentaries such as the Voice of America's "The Magic Bus" (2004) and "Hear Every Voice," a National Park Service documentary about his visual sociology and immigrant outreach (2009). Over the years, Professor Krase has served on the Boards of Directors, Awards, Grants and Prize Committees, as well as chairing, or otherwise helping to organize, annual meetings for the American Sociological Association, International Sociological Association, International Visual Sociology Association, Eastern Sociological Society, H-NET Humanities and Social Sciences On-Line, Society for the Study of Symbolic Interaction, Association for Humanist Sociology, American Italian Historical Association, Polish Institute of Arts and Sciences in America, Polish American Historical Society, International Urban Symposium, American Association for the Advancement of Science, and the Society for the Study of Social Problems.

He has reviewed many grant proposals for the PSC/CUNY Research Grants in Ethnic and Area Studies, United States Department of Health, Education, and Welfare, the Qatar National Research Fund, the Rockefeller Foundation Humanities Program, as well as research grants for projects in Canada, Belgium, and the European Union. In addition, Professor Krase has served on doctoral, or other graduate degree programs at the University of Trento, University of the Witwatersrand, South Africa, Catholic Pontifical University, São Paulo, University of Bergen, Norway, State University of New York at Albany, and the John Jay College of Criminal Justice CUNY.

Professor Krase has been active, presenting papers, in these and many other scholarly organizations such as the European Sociological Association and Eastern Sociological Society.

Krase has often been invited to lecture and participate in distinguished panels around the globe, such as: conducting a Graduate Visual Sociology Workshop at the Jagiellonian University, Krakow, Poland (2018) and lecturing on Urban Life and Culture at Zhejiang University, Hangzhou, China (2017).

He gave keynote addresses for the 2016 Fieldwork Photography Symposium, at the University of Central Lancaster, Preston UK (2016); "Cultural, Architectural Heritage and Social Inclusion," at the Università Suor Orsola Benincasa Naples, Italy (2015); a Doctoral Seminar: "Seeing Inequality," at Trento University, Italy (2014);

Forschungskolleg, Siegen, Germany (2013); "Thematic Doctoral School of Social Sciences," Catholic University of Louvain 2011, Offenes Symposium: Neue Mobilität & Vielfalt Eine Herausforderung für den Umbau der Stadtgesellschaft zur Inclusive City at the University of Siegen, Germany (2013); "Ethnic Crossroads: Visualizing Urban Narratives," University of Cologne, (2009); and The URC Lent Term seminar Series, London School of Economics and Political Science (2007).

Professor Krase has been a frequent Consultant and Tour Leader, for the United States' State Department, International Visitors Program. In 1983–1995 he was a Guberna¬torial Appointment to the board of directors of the New York Council for the Humanities.

== Public activity ==
Professor Krase has long been an Activist and Public Scholar who continues to consult with public and private agencies regarding urban community and cultural diversity issues.

He has written and photographed widely on urban life and culture and has lectured, exhibited, and researched urban neighborhoods in the US and abroad.

His past, and continuing service, on journal editorial boards, and as a manuscript reviewer for publishers is notable.

These include the following: American Sociological Review, Visual Studies, The Journal of Video Ethnography, Humanity and Society, International Sociology, Ethnologies, City, Culture and Society, Qualitative Sociology, Ethnologies International Migration Review, Housing, Theory, and Society, Contemporary Sociology, Space and Culture, The Cordoba Foundation Cultures in Dialogue, the University of Minnesota Press, Random House, Columbia University Press, SUNY Albany Press and the University of Manchester Press.

He has served on many of New York City's community organizations such as the Gowanus Development Corporation, Prospect Lefferts Gardens Association, the American Italian Coalition of Organizations, and TAMKEEN- The Center for Arab American Empowerment.

He advised the Greenwich Village Society for Historical Preservation, the NYC Controller's Office, and the Brooklyn Economic Development Corporation.

He was also a member, of the Brooklyn Borough President's Task Force on Equity, (2004–08) and consulted with the New York City Human Rights Commission.

As a concerned resident of Brooklyn, and a Brooklyn College faculty member, I have provided a wide variety of services over the years to the following organizations. As part of my commitment to bringing the college and community together, I have developed courses, and programs which bring my students to the community, and the community to the college. For example, in Research Seminars, paper assignments, and field trips to neighborhoods through the borough for my graduate and undergraduate courses. This work and my own research have resulted in many of the previously cited publications, papers, and other professional activities. Denotes current membership or activity

=== Photo credits and exhibitions ===
Curator, "The Italians of Brooklyn Revisited," Center for Italian American Studies Student Photographic Exhibition. Brooklyn College Library, October 4 – November 4, 2016.

Judge, and Art Submission, Brooklyn Museum Click! "The Changing Face of Brooklyn" Summer 2008.

Co-Curator, "Brooklyn Rising: The '70s and '80s, the Roots of Modern Brooklyn," Exhibit, Brooklyn College, BC Library Archives and Special Collections, Wolfe Institute, and the Center for the Study of Brooklyn, Venues: Brooklyn College Library, Brooklyn Borough Hall, Brooklyn Historical Society, Sovereign Bank Main Branch, Spring 2007 "White Ethnics" photographs used as chapter openers in Joseph F. Healey, Race, Ethnicity, Gender, and Class: The Sociology of Group Conflict and Change, Fourth Edition, Chapter 2, Sage/Pine Forge, 2006.

Archival and Other Photographs, in Contexts Magazine, American Sociological Association, 2005, 2006, 2007.

"The Dream… per non-dimenticare: la diaspora del popolo italiano negli state uniti d'america nel xx saecolo" ("Don't Forget the Dream: The Diaspora of the Italians to the United States of American in the 20th Century,") "le immagini dell'emigrazione nelle collezione americane" archivio centrale dello stato, 2006: 23–34.

Curator, Archival Photographs, in The Italians of New York: Five Centuries of Struggle and Achievement. Edited by Philip V. Cannistraro. New York: New York Historical Society, 1999.

Photographs for Chapters on "Analysis," and "Using Documents & Images as Qualitative Data," in Carol A.B. Warren and Tracy X. Karner, Discovering Qualitative Methods, Roxbury Publishing Company, 2005.

Curator, "The Italians of Brooklyn: Past and Present," Center for Italian American Studies Student Photographic Exhibition. Brooklyn College, May 1982.

=== Journalism and other published writing ===
- Jerry Krase Blog at: "Mall Wonder," "Traces" Blog at 2007, "What Makes you Part of Us?," USITALIA, 2006, "Ethnic Changes in Big and Little Italy," USITALIA, 2006
- Reprinted as "Don't Forget the Dream: The Diaspora of the Italians to the United States of America in the 20th Century," in Communes of Italy, 2006
- "Images of the Silent Majority," USITALIA, 2005.
- "Yes in My Backyard," Op-Ed in The New York Sun, 2004.
- Print Columns on Politics, Ethnicity, and Community in The Free Press, Brooklyn, New York, 1989.
- The NYC Free Press. Online.
- Now as Your free press.
- The Brownstoner. A publication of the Brownstone Revival Committee of New York City. 1987–88.
- "URBAN ISSUES" Column.
- "The 'Catch 22's' of Housing Integration", 1988.
- "Yuppies and the Market Crash", 1987.
- "Taking' the Fifth," 1987.
- "Displacement: Good, Bad and Inevitable", 1987.
- United Charitable Trust of Boston. Brooklyn College Center for Italian American Studies. Special Photographic Projects. 1978.

== Honors, grants and awards ==
- President, European Academy of Sciences of Ukraine, 2020.
- Honorary Editorial board member, Visual Studies, Journal of the International Visual Sociology Association, 2020.
- New York State Assembly Citation for Community Service as a Journalist, educator, and author, 2019.
- Fulbright Specialist Assignment Prague, Charles University, May 11–25, 2018.
- Ernest Gellner Seminar, "Seeing the Image of Cities Change. Again," Visual Presentation, Sponsored by the Czech Association for Social Anthropology and the Czech Sociological Society, in Cooperation with the Institute of Sociological Studies of the Faculty of Social Sciences, Charles University, Prague, Czech Republic, May 15, 2018.
- J. William Fulbright Foreign Scholarship, Fulbright Specialist Program, 2017–20.
- Mentor, Bridges Across Brooklyn: "City as Classroom" Faculty Fellowship program at the Brooklyn College Roberta S. Matthews Center for Teaching, 2009–10.
- America's Best Idea Program, National Park Foundation and the Evelyn and Walter Haas Jr. Fund, Gateway National Recreation Area, Outreach to Underserved Communities, 2009.
- New York City Women's Foundation Grant, "New York City's Arab American Community Needs Assessment," 2006–2007.
- Brooklyn College Foundation, "Tolerance Project," "The People of Coney Island Avenue," Photography Project Grant, 2007.
- "The Staten Island Italian American Experience, " Wagner College, Staten Island, 2005–06.
- Monsignor Gino Baroni Award, Italian Americana, 2005.
- The Bill Cecil-Fronsman Teaching Award for Aural and Visual Literacy in the Social Science Classroom H-Net: Humanities and Social Sciences Online, Annual Meeting of the American Historical Association, Washington DC, January 2004.
- Associate Calandra Scholar. John D. Calandra Italian American Institute, New York City Project: "Little Italies and Chinatowns." 2003–04.
- Making a Difference Award, Fifth Annual Student Life Conference, Dean for Student Life, Brooklyn College of The City University of New York, 2003.
- committee member, Brooklyn College Brooklyn Institute Proposal. Independence Community Bank Foundation. Project committee member. Project Development Grant Awarded. Summer, 2002.
- committee member, Brooklyn College's "Community in Diversity and Global Citizenship Project" Proposal for the Association of American University and College's Office of Diversity and Global Initiatives. Project committee member. 2002. 3-year Grant Awarded.
- Murray Koppelman Professor, 1999–2001 Brooklyn College Foundation Endowed Chair.
- Brooklyn College Foundation, Murray Koppelman, Travel Awards. 2000–2001.
- Visiting professor, University of Rome, Rector's Award. La Sapienza, June 1998.
- Kosciuszko Foundation and Polish Ministry of National Education Fellowship Awards to "Explore Polish Vernacular Architecture" Spring, 1997.
- Visiting professor, University of Trento, October 1996.
- Fulbright Award, Cancelled by Conflict, Croatia, 1996.
- Honor for "Interest and Concern to the Brooklyn Community," The Idea of Work in the 21st Century Conference, Chinese American Scholars Association, 1995.
- Brooklyn College Academy. Diamond Foundation. Grants. Two Years. "The Great Depression." And "Teenage Years." High School-College Collaboration. 1990–1992. Project committee member.
- PSC/CUNY Faculty Research Award. "Photographic Research in Southern Italy." Summer, 1985.
- PSC/CUNY Faculty Research Award. "Madision Club of Brooklyn" C. LaCerra. Project Director. 1982.
- Italian American Institute to Foster Higher Education. Book Project. "Italo-America" With R. Caporale of St. John's University. 1982.
- Italian American Institute to Foster Higher Education. Special Projects for Brooklyn College Center for Italian American Studies. 1982.
- Giovanni Agnelli Foundation of Turin, Italy. Brooklyn College Center for Italian American Studies. Special Collection "Italians of Brooklyn: Past and Present.", 1981.
- Brooklyn College Foundation. Brooklyn College Center for Italian American Studies. Special Projects. 1981.
- New York State Department of Education Umbrella Program, Curriculum Development on Community Education. Carroll Gardens Neighborhood Association. 1981–1982.
- National Endowment for the Humanities, Youth Division, Special Projects. Carroll Gardens Neighborhood Association. 1981–1982.
- Chemical Bank. Brooklyn College Center for Italian American Studies. Special Projects. 1980.
- Alpha Sigma Lambda, National Honorary Society of Evening Colleges, 1979.
- Federation of Italian American Organizations of Brooklyn. Brooklyn College Center for Italian American Studies. Special Projects. 1979.

== Personal life ==
In 1964, Krase married Suzanne Nicoletti. She had an EdD and worked as a Hospital Administrator. They have three daughters Kristin Martha Krase, MS, an Educational psychologist; Karen Rose Krase, MS, a Pediatric Occupational Therapist; and Kathryn Suzanne Krase, PhD, JD, MSW a Legal and Educational Consultant.

== Publications ==
=== Books ===
- Self and Community in the city.
- The Presentation of Community in Urban Society.
- A Comprehensive Substance Abuse Information System.
- Statistical Guide to Greenwich Village.
- Traces of Home.
- Greenwich Village: Statistical Trends and Observations.
- Seeing Cities Change.
- Italian-Americans and College Life: A Survey of Student Experiences at Brooklyn College.
- The Melting Pot and Beyond: Italian Americans.
- Race, Class, and Gentrification in Brooklyn.
- Ethnicity and Machine Politics.
- Race and Ethnicity in New York City.
- Ethnic Landscapes in an Urban World.
- The Status of Interpretation in Italian American Studies (editor).
- Italian Americans in a Multicultural Society.
- The Staten Island Italian American Experience.
- Industry, Labor, Technologies and the Italian American Communities.
- The Review of Italian American Studies.
- Italian American Politics: Local, Global/Cultural, Personal.
- Diversity and Local Contexts.
- Italian Americans Before Mass Migration.
- Gentrification around the World, Volume I.
- Gentrification around the World, Volume II.
- The Melting Pot and Beyond.
- Varieties of Urban Experience.

=== Other publications ===
- The World in Brooklyn: Gentrification, Immigration, and Ethnic Politics in a Global City.
- Diversity and Local Contexts: Urban Space, Borders, and Migration.
- Invisible angel or what to photograph.
- Researching the Visual.
- Journal of Architectural and Planning Research.
- The Routledge Handbook of Religion and Cities.
- Ethnic Landscapes of America.
- Leaving Little Italy: Essaying Italian American Culture.
- An Offer We Can't Refuse: The Mafia in the Mind of America.
- Environment and Planning: Society & space. D, Volume 26, Issues 4–6.
- A Historical Context and Archaeological Research Design for Townsite Properties in California.
- Cities and Urban Life.
