= NHJ =

NHJ may refer to:

- Nicky Hambleton-Jones (born 1971), television presenter with the personal stylist consultancy NHJ Style
- Nikole Hannah-Jones (born 1976), American journalist, professor, and lead author of The 1619 Project
- Niels Hansen Jacobsen (1861–1941), Danish sculptor and ceramist
- Norra Hälsinglands Järnväg, a Swedish railway from 1896 to 1962
- Norsk Hoved-Jernbane class of locomotives in Manning Wardle
- NHJ, a Brazilian company that sponsors the Museu da Imagem e do Som do Rio de Janeiro
- nhj, a deprecated ISO code for Sierra Puebla Nahuatl
