= Skin Tight =

Skin Tight may refer to:

== Literature ==
- Skin Tight (novel), a 1989 novel by Carl Hiaasen
- Skintight, a 2008 nonfiction book by Meredith Jones

== Music ==
- Skin Tight (album), by the Ohio Players, or the title song, 1974
- "Skin Tight", a song by Chicago from the 1976 album Chicago X
- Skintight, an album by Liv Kristine, or the title song, 2010
- "Skin Tight", a song by Scissor Sisters from Night Work, 2010
- "Skintight", a song by Kid Confucius, 2005
- "Skintight", a song by Ted Nugent from the 1988 album If You Can't Lick 'Em... Lick 'Em

== Other uses ==
- Skin-tight garment
- Skin Tight (TV series), a 2016 spin-off from My 600-lb Life
