= Meredith Jones =

Meredith Jones may refer to:

- Meredith Jones (athlete), Australian Paralympic athlete
- Meredith Jones (author) (born 1965), Australian-British cultural theorist
- Meredith Leam Jones (1926–1996), American zoologist
