= Optimax =

UK laser eye treatment clinic

Optimax Clinics Limited
- Company type: Private
- Industry: Healthcare
- Founded: 1991
- Headquarters: Birmingham, England, UK
- Area served: United Kingdom
- Key people: Beata McManus (CEO)
- Website: https://www.optimax.co.uk

Optimax is a laser eye treatment specialist based in Birmingham, England, owned by Russell Keith Ambrose.

Laser eye surgery in the UK is dominated by three main companies Optical Express, Ultralase and Optimax which, in total, account for approximately 56% of clinics in the UK.

== History ==
In 2002, Optimax performed their 100,000th laser eye surgery procedure.

Optimax operates clinics throughout the UK, providing laser and lens eye surgery procedures.

Optimax advertise as being the first company to introduce Femtosecond laser, IntraLASIK and Schwind lasers.

In December 2012 Russell Keith Ambrose acquired Ultralase Ltd.

Under Eye Hospitals Group Limited, Ultralase Eye Clinics Limited is the sister company to Optimax, sharing clinics, surgeons, optometrists, and working as one family.

In April 2014 Nominet dismissed a complaint by Optical Express that Russell Keith Ambrose had funded a website critical of Optical Express. Its author, Sasha Rodoy, My Beautiful Eyes Foundation campaigner and Patient Advocate, underwent lasek eye surgery at Optimax in 2011, resulting in her eyes being irreparably damaged.

On 27 November 2020, after claiming insolvency, Optimax Clinics Ltd entered a Company Voluntary Arrangement (CVA) for four years.

== See also ==
- Private healthcare in the United Kingdom
