= Inéquilibre =

Coordinates: 1.27465°N 103.84474°E

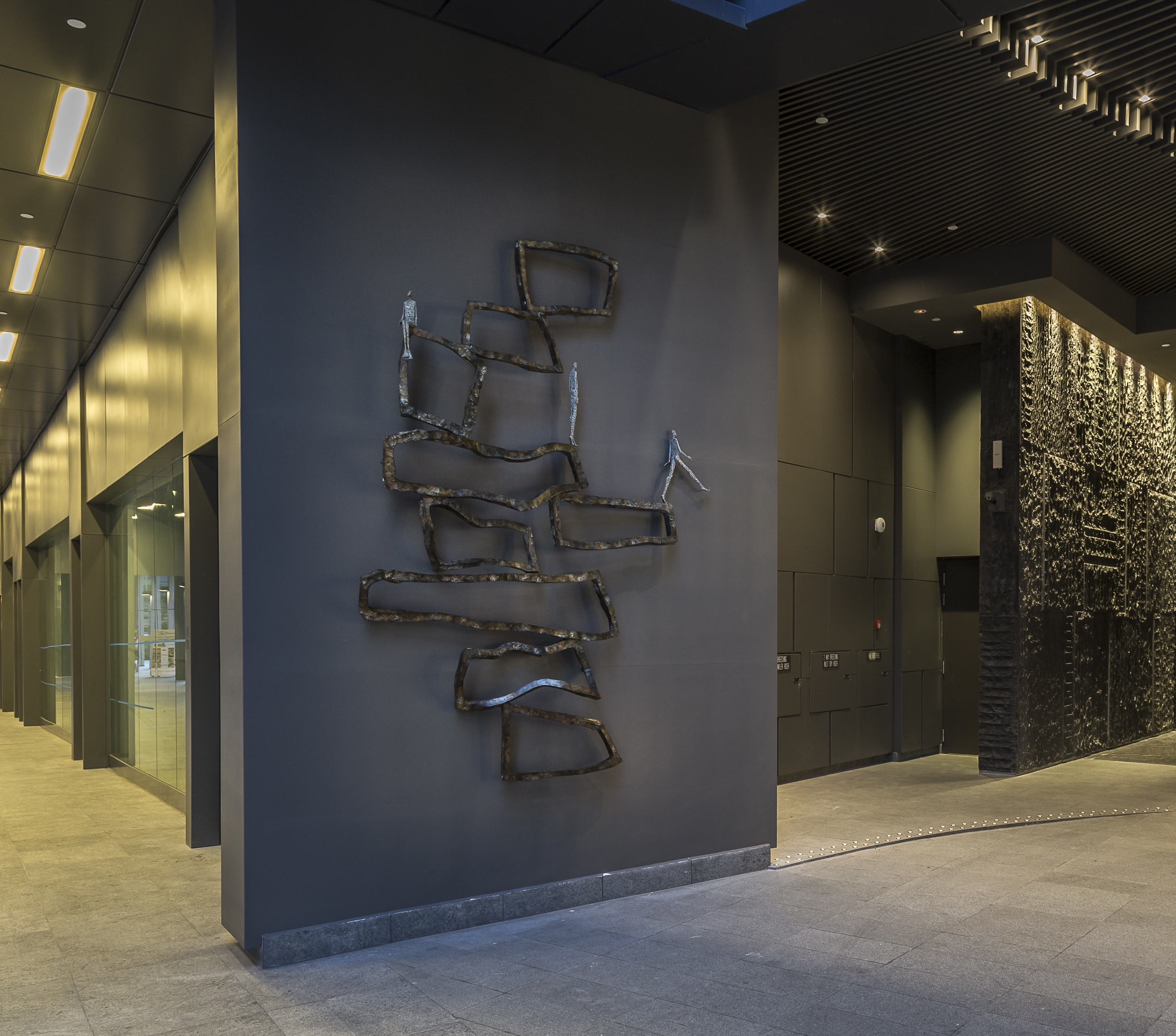
- Artist: Val
- Year: 2014
- Type: bronze
- Dimensions: 214 cm × 288 cm (84 in × 113 in)
- Location: Singapore

Inéquilibre (lit. 'imbalance', from the French: équilibre, "balance") is a bronze sculpture by French artist Val. Out of the twelve editions, only one is placed publicly within SkySuite, the highest residential tower in Singapore.

== Description ==
This sculpture was inspired by the ruined temples under restoration at Angkor Wat in Cambodia. Each stone is removed, numbered, and each temple is reconstructed, embellished by the marks of time. The man moves alongside, serene and as a witness of his own time. The sculpture questions the place of mankind, to whom imbalance (inéquilibre) is offered, and the search for harmony within that imbalance.
