= Skysuites @ Anson =

Residential skyscraper in Singapore

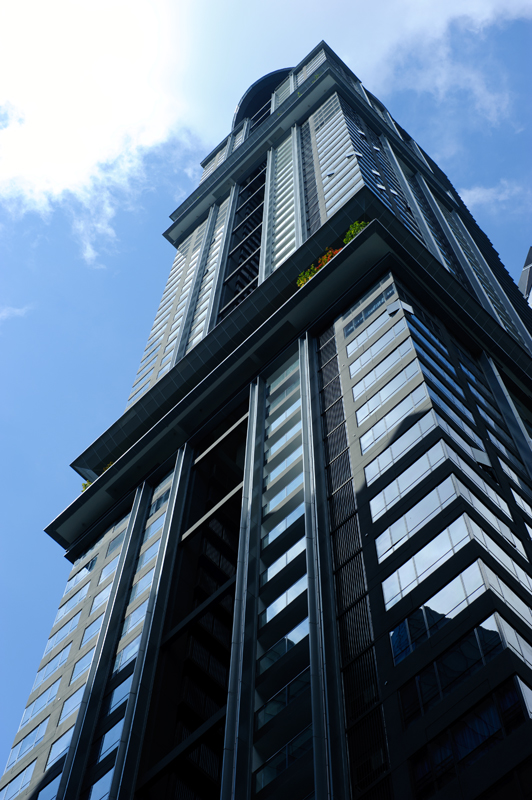
- Interactive map of the Skysuites @ Anson area

General information
- Type: Residential
- Location: Tanjong Pagar, Singapore, 8 Enggor Street, Tanjong Pagar, Singapore 079718
- Coordinates: 1°16′28.2″N 103°50′41.1″E
- Construction started: 2011
- Completed: 2014

Height
- Roof: 250 m (820 ft)

Technical details
- Floor count: 71
- Floor area: 2,788 m^{2} (30,010 sq ft)

Design and construction
- Architects: P & T Consultants Pte Ltd.
- Developer: Arcadia Development Pte. Limited
- Main contractor: Woh Hup (Private) Ltd.

Other information
- Number of units: 360

Website
- https://skysuitesanson.cos.sg

Skysuites @ Anson is one of the tallest skyscrapers in Singapore and tied for the tallest residential building with Altez. The building sits at the city centre of Tanjong Pagar.

== Background ==
Construction started in 2011 and ended in 2014. The structure is primarily made from poured concrete and steel. The building is 250 metres (820.21 ft) tall and has a 2,788.1 square metres (30,011 sq ft) footprint. It is tied for the 7th tallest building in Singapore. The building is primarily a condominium with restaurants scattered throughout the complex. The leasehold of the condominium is 99 years.

== Artwork ==
A bronze sculpture, Inéquilibre, by French artist Val is placed publicly within the building. It is the only one, out of 12 editions, to be publicly displayed.

== Gallery ==
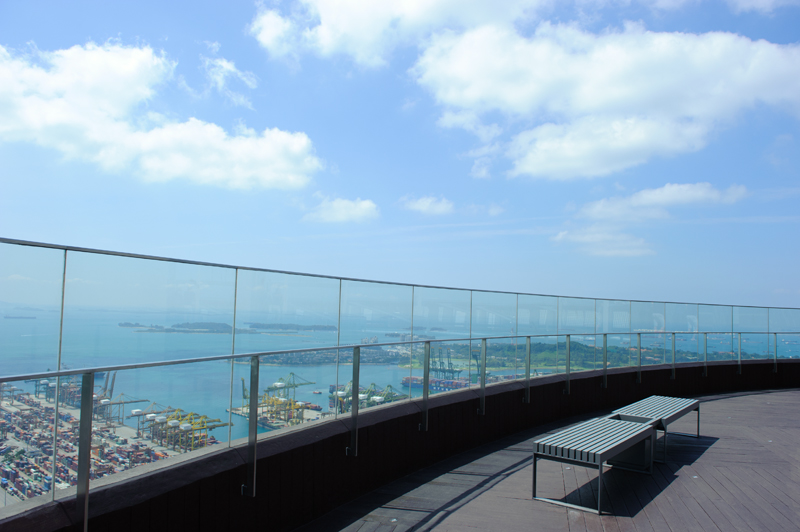
View from observation deck

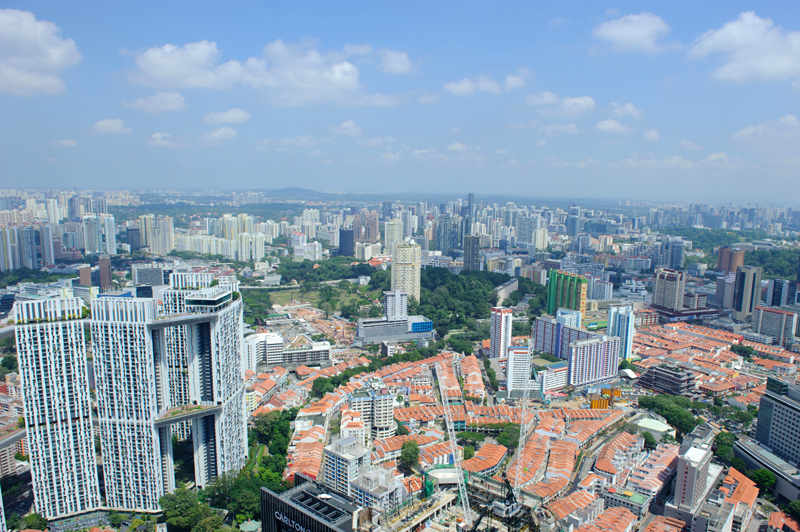
Tanjong Pagar as viewed from a balcony

== See also ==
- List of tallest buildings in Singapore
- Architecture of Singapore
