= The Harley Medical Group =

Cosmetic surgery company

Coordinates: 51.5173°N 0.1460°W

- Type: Privately held
- Industry: Medical Practice
- Founded: 1984; 42 years ago
- Founder: Mel Braham
- Headquarters: London, United Kingdom
- Number of locations: 18
- Services: cosmetic surgery and skin and laser treatments
- Owner: Optical Express; (2024–present)
- Number of employees: 166
- Website: harleymedical.co.uk

The Harley Medical Group (THMG Limited) is a private limited company with head offices based in London, England. It specialised in cosmetic surgery and skin and laser treatments in the UK. In July 2024, one month after stopping trading, the chain was acquired by Optical Express.

== History ==
The company was founded in 1983 by Australian entrepreneur, Mel Braham. It was established as Arana Trading Company (1983) and had several other names including Cavendish Hair Clinic Limited (1984), Harley Medical Centre Limited (2013), Harley Medical Group Limited (2014) and THMG Limited (since 2014).

In 2012, The Harley Medical Group knowingly fitted breast implants which were later found to be faulty. Evidence showed that the implants could rupture and leak industrial-grade silicone into the body. The company then washed their hands of the business and carried on trading. Every other business involved in the scandal replaced the faulty implants free of charge. The National Health Service (NHS) treated nearly 900 of Harley Medical's patients who had been fitted with the defective implants. The group faced legal claims from 1,700 women who were fitted with the defective implants.

Mel Braham, the chairman of THMG at the time, gave a statement which confirmed the Medicines and Healthcare products Regulatory Agency had approved the PIP implants before the company used them. Many other UK clinics, including Transforming Lives, were also supplied with the faulty implants. The supplier of the implants, Poly Implant Prothese (PIP), fell into liquidation in 2011.

As of July 17, 2024, The Harley Medical Group and its parent company SK:N Group have ceased trading. A month later, Optical Express acquired the chain, as well as other assets from the then parent company of THMG Limited.

=== Hacking ===
In April 2014, The Harley Medical Group suffered a cyber-attack which exposed 500,000 people's personal information. It was reported that 480,000 initial inquiry forms submitted online may have been accessed in an attempt to extort money from the company. The company stated that no medical or financial information was compromised as a result, and contacted the police and the Information Commissioner's Office regarding the possible data breach.

== Compliance ==
The company is regulated under The Care Quality Commission (CQC) for England and The Healthcare Inspectorate Wales (HIW) for Wales. All implant usage is compliant with the Breast Implant Registry. As part of the regulatory compliance, Harley Medical Group surgeons are registered with the General Medical Council (GMC) and are on the Specialist Register of Plastic Surgeons. Likewise, nurses are registered with the Nursing and Midwifery Council (NMC).
