= Jan Stanek =

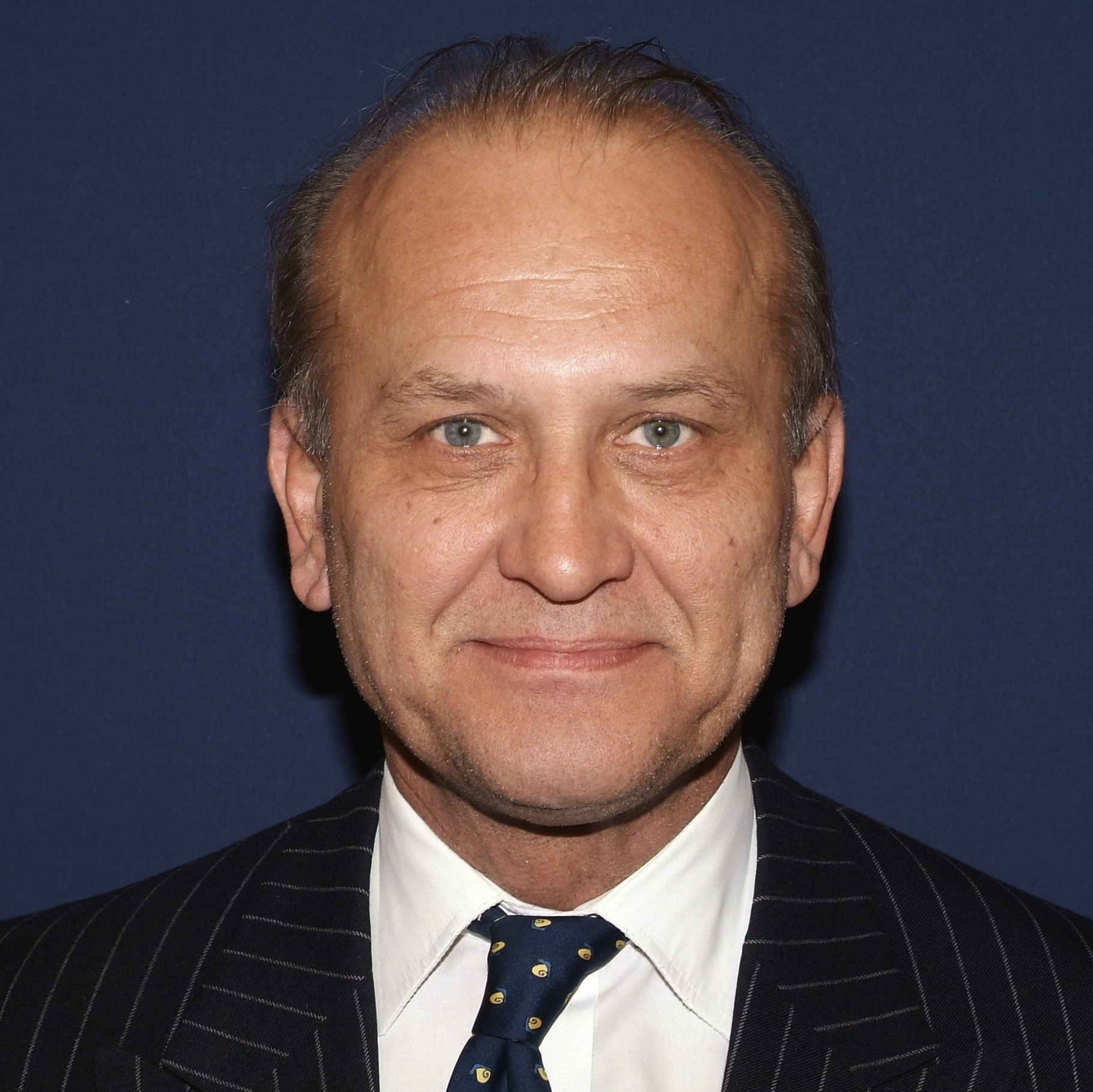
- Jan Stanek
- Born: Jan Jiří Staněk; 21 July 1948 (age 78); Prague, Czechoslovakia
- Occupations: Surgeon, lecturer and broadcaster
- Television: 10 Years Younger, Plastic Fantastic
- Website: www.janstanek.com

Jan Stanek (born 21 July 1948) is a British cosmetic surgeon, lecturer and broadcaster. He is a Fellow of the Royal College of Surgeons, and a member of the British Medical Association, the Royal Society of Medicine and The American Academy of Cosmetic Surgery. He has a private practice in central London.

As consultant surgeon, he was featured in all six series of Channel 4's 10 Years Younger. He also appeared in the Channel 5 series Plastic Fantastic. He is the author of several books including Laser Aesthetic Surgery (Galen, Prague, 2000) and 10 Years Younger: Cosmetic Surgery Bible (Transworld, London, 2007).

== Early life and career ==
Jan Stanek was born in Prague, Czechoslovakia. He was educated at Prague Industrial-Technical Secondary School before studying for a Bachelor of Arts degree at the University of Oxford. After graduating in 1972, he went on to study medicine and was awarded his Bachelor of Medicine and Bachelor of Surgery degrees in 1975. He received an MA degree from Oxford the following year.

During his early career, he worked as house surgeon at Oxford's Radcliffe Infirmary and was house physician at the Royal South Hants Hospital in Southampton. In 1977, he was senior house officer in plastic surgery at Churchill Hospital in Oxford, taking up a post as registrar in plastic surgery at Newcastle's Royal Victoria Infirmary the following year.

He became a member of the Fellowship of the Royal College of Surgeons (FRCS) in 1981, working as a senior registrar in general surgery at London's Westminster Hospital before entering private practice in 1984. Through the rest of the 1980s, Stanek worked with several large cosmetic surgery clinics until the demands of his own practice led him to focus solely on private referrals.

== Surgery ==
Stanek is considered to be one of the leading surgeons in his field. The Daily Express described him as "one of most popular surgeons of his generation".

Although his practice covers all aspects of cosmetic surgery, including breast augmentation and reduction, abdominoplasty and liposuction, his particular interest lies in facial cosmetic surgery, endoscopic facial surgery and facial rejuvenation.

Among the techniques he uses is the muscle-tightening SMAS (superficial musculoaponeurotic system) facelift, which is said to result in minimal scarring. He also performs chemical peels and, in the television series 10 Years Younger, explained the science behind them and was then seen carrying out the procedure.

In 1994, he was the first surgeon in Britain to carry out the extended subperiosteal facelift, which was pioneered by US surgeons. Stanek originally studied the technique in Texas.

Stanek is known for his technique of fixing skin and muscle after eyelid surgery, which apparently cuts recovery time and reduces risk for those who heal slowly.

In 2012, Stanek conducted a study with fellow surgeon Mike Berry into the French-made PIP breast implants. Their report to the Journal of Plastic and Aesthetic Surgery revealed that, in an audit of 453 patients, between 16% and 34% of the PIP implants ruptured. This compared to a failure rate of less than 1% in the preferred implants used by the surgeons.

He is sceptical about the use of liposuction for certain areas, warning: "Liposuction to the inner thighs makes very little difference unless there are big lumps of fat and can cause problems as the skin is very thin in that area. If you remove the 'support', you can accelerate the aging process as skin becomes less elastic and is likely to sag."

At his London clinic, clients are also offered body contouring through the non-invasive cellulite reduction and skin-tightening system Exilis, which uses ultrasound with radio-frequency pulses to reduce subcutaneous fat.

He is a frequent commentator in the British media on cosmetic surgery issues.

== Professional bodies ==
Stanek is a specialist in general surgery (GMC ppecialist list) and has been a fellow of the Royal College of Surgeons (RCS) since 1981. He is certified by the American Board of Cosmetic Surgery and is a member of the American Academy of Cosmetic Surgery, the European Society for Laser Aesthetic Surgery and the Association of Facial Plastic Surgeons in Great Britain.

He has been a regular speaker at medical conferences since the 1980s.

== Other projects ==
As well as his work in broadcasting, he has contributed expert testimony to newspapers and magazines, including the Evening Standard and The Observer. He also contributed a regular column to the magazine Slim at Home.

He has been featured a number of times in Tatler magazine and was named as one of Britain's Top 250 Consultants in the Tatler Doctors Guide 2013. In 2011, Tatler described him as "the Simon Cowell of surgeons" adding that "he's accomplished at some of the trickiest procedures".

He continues to be an in-demand guest speaker on the subject of cosmetic surgery around the world, attending key events such as New York's Breast & Body Symposium, the National Congress on Laser Surgery in Jakarta, Indonesia, and the Pacific Conference on Plastic & Dermatological Surgery in Hong Kong. During a Facelift Symposium held by the Association of Facial Plastic Surgeons in Poole, Dorset in October 2009, Stanek gave presentations on a number of topics including Extended SMAS Facelift and Neck Lifting Versus Submental Liposuction.

In 2011, at London's Lazarides Gallery, the artist Jonathan Yeo exhibited paintings inspired by the work of Stanek and fellow surgeon Mike Berry.
