= Optical Express =

Ophthalmology services provider

DCM (Optical Holdings) Ltd
- Trade name: Optical Express Group
- Type: Private
- Industry: Healthcare
- Founded: 1991
- Founder: David Moulsdale (CEO)
- Headquarters: Glasgow, Scotland, UK
- Area served: United Kingdom; Ireland; Germany; Croatia; USA
- Key people: David Moulsdale (CEO)
- Products: Spectacles contact lenses refractive surgery healthcare services
- Revenue: ▲£204.67m (2011) ▼£188.22m (31 Dec 2011) ▼£169.40m (29 Dec 2012) ▼£143.20m (28 Dec 2013)
- Operating income: ▲£8.67m (2011) ▼£0.12m (31 Dec 2011) ▼ -£13.25m (29 Dec 2012) ▼ -£4.85m (28 Dec 2013)
- Net income: ▲£3.87m (2011) ▼ -£3.21m (31 Dec 2011) ▼ -£14.96m (29 Dec 2012) ▲ -£6.00m (28 Dec 2013)
- Owner: DCM (Optical Holdings) Limited
- Number of employees: ▼1,552
- Parent: DCM (Optical Holdings) Limited
- Subsidiaries: Optical Express Ltd; Optical Express (Holdings) Ltd; Cruach Capital Ltd; The Frame Zone Ltd; Bridgewater Hospital (Manchester) Ltd & others
- Website: www.opticalexpress.com

Optical Express is a provider of ophthalmology services including laser eye surgery, cataract surgery and lens replacement surgery in Europe.

Optical Express is a trading name of DCM (Optical Holdings) Limited which operates as the Optical Express Group. In 2013 the company was described by the Competition Commission as the market leader in refractive surgery. As a chain of retail opticians, offering a number of healthcare services, the company once operated a private hospital in Manchester. This closed on 4 June 2015.

== Financial history ==
Accounts filed at Companies House for the calendar year 2011 reported a loss of £1.5 million, the previous year the company made a profit of nearly £6.9million.

In November 2012, Optical Express closed a subsidiary with 83 stores placed into administration and 40 store closures. In December 2012, Optical Express said it would open 40 new sites as laser consultation/treatment centres in 2013, which it later went on to do. Landlords expressed dismay that this closure happened two days after quarterly rents were due. Optical Express said it was consolidating its retail portfolio to "focus resources on its flagship locations and online business".

1 October 2013: Accounts filed at Companies House show DCM (Optical Holdings) recorded a pre-tax loss of £15.1m in the 12 months to 29 December 2012, wider than the £1.5m loss in the prior year. Founder David Moulsdale unveiled the intention to appoint an administrator for DCM Optical Clinic and then buy back 16 of the 19 stores.

Accounts filed for 27 December 2014 show a total revenue of £134m and an operating profit of £13m.

In December 2017 Optical Express recorded a turnover of £101.9 million. In December 2019, the company recorded a turnover of £117.1 million and in 2020 recorded a turnover of £99.1 million with an operating profit of £20.8 million.

2021 saw Optical Express record a turnover of £157.4 million during the year, pre-tax profits rose to £52.1m against £20.8m in the prior year.

== Operations ==
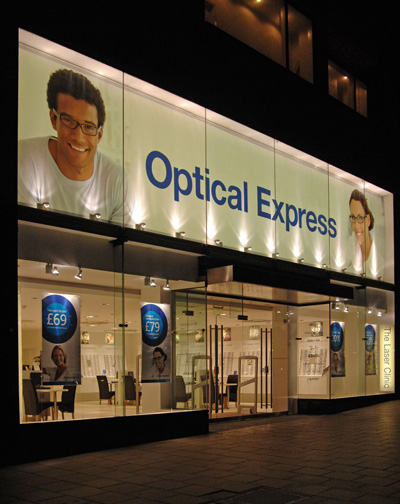
An Optical Express store.

The Optical Express group of companies formerly operated in a range of healthcare services including the optical and cosmetic industries under the brand names Optical Express, The Dental Clinic, The Cosmetic Clinic and Bridgewater Hospital. The company now focuses on refractive treatments and is the largest private provider in the UK and Ireland.

In late 2022 the Optical Express clinics in Glasgow, Dundee and Inverness were each rated “Exceptional” following inspections by HIS (Healthcare Improvement Scotland). In November 2022 the Birmingham Clinic received an “outstanding” rating from the CQC (Care Quality Commission).

In January 2023 the Optical Express clinic in Aberdeen was also rated “exceptional” by HIS.

The group was founded in 1991 by David Moulsdale with one Optical Express branch based in Leith, Edinburgh. The company grew steadily following its establishment, acquiring the 11 stores of Remocker Shapiro in 1995, and the 65 stores of Specialeyes PLC in 1997. These were followed in 2001 by 34 stores from Co-op Eyecare, and 14 more Scottish stores from Specdeals in 2002.

Optical Express entered the refractive eye surgery market in 2002 when it acquired The Health Clinic which offered general ophthalmic procedures across slightly less than 20 locations in the UK. In 2004 it acquired the ophthalmic treatment assets of Boots Group plc from nine sites in the UK. As a result of the acquisitions, the 700 employees were transferred to Optical Express bringing the total number of employees to 2,300 for Optical Express. The company did not acquire Boots' other optician assets.

In 2004, Optical Express acquired two Free Vision Euro Eyes laser vision correction clinics in Amsterdam and The Hague, marking the first large-scale UK optical chain to extend its laser vision correction business in the Netherlands. Optical Express acquired the dentistry and laser eye surgery services of Alliance Boots in 2005, trading under the name 'The Dental Clinic'. These assets were sold in 2013.

November 2013: A Competition Commission report into the merger of two rival companies reported that Optical Express share of the laser eye surgery market was nearly twice the size, and in intraocular lens surgery six times as big as both Optimax and Ultralase combined, the report concluded that the merger of Optimax and Ultralase would not lessen competition in the market.

April 2014: A complaint by the company that rival Optimax had funded a protest website owned by My Beautiful Eyes Foundation campaigner Sasha Rodoy was dismissed by Nominet.

January 2015: The Medicine and Healthcare products Regulatory Agency (MHRA) announced they were investigating claims that an artificial lens (MPlus X manufactured by Oculentis) implanted into the eyes of thousands of patients had caused serious problems with distance vision. Oculentis released a statement refuting allegations made in articles in the UK media about the lens causing severe vision loss, citing "significant factual innaccuracies" in the articles, claiming them to be "untrue" and "highly defamatory". As of September 2016, no official inquiry into the lens has been launched in the UK.

January 2015: following an article in the Observer newspaper and The Guardian online, the Daily Mail published an article claiming that blindness could result from lens implant surgery.

The company provides home eye tests for patients with complex disabilities and low vision across most of Scotland.

Currently the largest provider of laser eye surgery, lens replacement surgery and private cataract surgery in the UK, Optical Express continues to open new clinics and treatment centres including in Edinburgh and Belfast in 2022 with more planned throughout 2023 and beyond.

== Advertising ==
In 2007, the Advertising Standards Authority rejected a complaint that the claim "from only £395 per eye" featured in an Optical Express TV and leaflet campaign was misleading, and in 2011, the authority upheld a complaint about television advert featuring Pádraig Harrington, which was later replaced by one featuring the voice of Michael Gambon.

In 2011 the Advertising Standards Authority upheld 17 complaints about brochures.

In 2012 another TV advert was removed due to misleading content. and a complaint was partially upheld against the Optical Express website.

In January 2015 the Information Commissioners Office sent Optical Express an enforcement notice following 4,600 complaints regarding unsolicited messages

== Charity ==
Optical Express have supported hundreds of humanitarian and philanthropic projects for more than 30 years, donating more than £33 million to causes both in the UK and abroad. In 2004, the group donated funds to the Royal National Institute of Blind People (RNIB) to open an employment skills and rehabilitation facility for blind and partially sighted people.

In 2007, Optical Express formed a partnership with Glasgow-based charity organisation, The Caring City. Donated spectacles are distributed free of charge via local clinics to communities within Burundi.

Optical Express has also been a main supporter of the annual Glasgow Taxi Outing, having been so since 2007. This event sees over 150 taxi drivers in the city dress up in fancy dress and take children with additional learning needs to the seaside for free, along with their parents and carers.

In 2014, Optical Express raised over £10,000 for the STV Appeal. In 2015, it raised over £100,000.

Optical Express has a long-standing relationship with global vision charity, Sightsavers. In 2014, the company and its staff helped to raise over £10,000 for the charity's Christmas Appeal. In 2016, Optical Express staff from its Lister Gate clinic took part in the obstacle course race Wolf Run at Stanford Hall, Leicestershire and raised over £1,200 for people who are going blind, or at risk of going blind, from preventable conditions.

In August 2016, Optical Express partnered with the charity Chernobyl Children's Life Line to provide free eye care for children from the contaminated area around the nuclear disaster site.

In January 2020 Optical Express donated £100,000 to Race Against Dementia, the charity founded by Sir Jackie Stewart to fund breakthrough and innovative dementia research.

In Feb 2019 Optical Express promoted their Thanks a Million campaign which would see them donated over £1 million of free laser eye surgery to NHS and emergency service workers across the UK, In April 2020 Optical Express treated their £1 million patient as part of their Thanks a Million campaign.
