= 10 Years Younger (British TV series) =

- Created by: Maverick Television
- Starring: Nicky Hambleton-Jones (2004–2008); Myleene Klass (2010); Cherry Healey (2020–present)
- Narrated by: Denise Welch
- Country of origin: United Kingdom
- Original language: English

Production
- Producer: Melissa Feather (series 6)
- Running time: 60 mins
- Production company: Maverick Television

Original release
- Network: Channel 4; Channel 5
- Release: 28 April 2004 – present

10 Years Younger in 10 Days, previously called 10 Years Younger (and sometimes called 10 Years Younger: The Challenge), is a make-over show aired on Channel 5 in Britain and repeated on its 5Star network. As 10 Years Younger, the series debuted as a Channel 4 programme in 2004, before being relaunched and rebranded by Channel 5 in 2020.

Presented for its first five series by Nicky Hambleton-Jones, who was replaced by Myleene Klass for series six, with Cherry Healey hosting the show for Channel 5, with the programme's full name also being used in Australia.

== Format ==
With the help of experts, the participant is given a complete make-over in an attempt to make them look 10 Years Younger, partially through plastic surgery. At the start of the programme, the person's age is guessed by 100 people on the street and an average is taken. From this, the target image is set. At the end, this is repeated to see the results.

The programme regularly makes use of cosmetic surgery, which has attracted criticism from some quarters. However, in his book 10 Years Younger: Cosmetic Surgery Bible, the show's resident consultant surgeon Jan Stanek says: "I decided to take part in the series because I felt that it offered an opportunity to shine an honest light on what was involved in cosmetic surgery and to address some of the common misconceptions about it."

== Experts ==
- Presenter:
  - Series 1–5: Nicky Hambleton-Jones (and clothing stylist)
  - Series 6: Myleene Klass
  - Series 6: Denise Welch (narrator)
  - Series 7–8: Cherry Healey (Channel 5, series 1–2)
- Jan Stanek – cosmetic surgery
- Dr Uchenna Okoye – dentistry
- John Vial – hair
- Andrew Barton – hair
- Guy Parsons – hair
- Karen Melvin – hair colour
- Ruby Hammer – make-up (series 1–5)
- Lisa Eldridge – make-up
- Gemma Sheppard – style and fashion
- Kat Byrne – behind-the-scenes assistance with clothing
- Dan Reinstein – specialist laser eye surgery ophthalmic surgeon

== Books ==
There are three books that accompany the series. The first two are written by former presenter Nicky Hambleton-Jones; the third book is written by Jan Stanek with Hayley Treacy.

- 10 Years Younger in 10 Days (paperback – 17 January 2005)
- 10 Years Younger Nutrition Bible (paperback – 2 February 2006)
- 10 Years Younger Cosmetic Surgery Bible (paperback – 1 February 2007)

== International versions ==
Country	Name	Host	Network	Premiere
Australia	10 Years Younger In 10 Days	Sonia Kruger	Channel Seven	21 April 2009
Brazil	10 Anos Mais Jovem	Ligia Mendes	SBT	6 March 2009 – 2 October 2009
Czech Republic	Mladší o pár let	Sabina Laurinová	Prima televize	14 January 2010
Czech Republic	O 10 let mladší	Monika Absolonová	TV Nova	24 October 2018
Czech Republic	O 10 let mladší	Martina Randová	TV Nova	23 October 2019
Finland	Vuosia nuoremmaksi	Anne Kukkohovi	AVA	7 October 2015
New Zealand	10 Years Younger	Fiona McDonald	TV One	Unknown
Russia	На 10 лет моложе	Svetlana Abramova	Channel One	4 April 2015
Slovakia	O 10 rokov mladší	Mirka Kalisová and Martin Šmahel	Markíza	10 January 2017
Slovakia	O 10 rokov mladší	Mária Čírová	Markíza	10 January 2017
Ukraine	на 10 років молодше	Alexey Vertinsky	Ukraine	4 October 2008
United States	10 Years Younger	Kyan Douglas	TLC network	1 December 2004

== See also ==
- London Welbeck Hospital – a hospital used in the show
