= Ruby Hammer =

British makeup artist (born 1961)

Ruby Hammer MBE
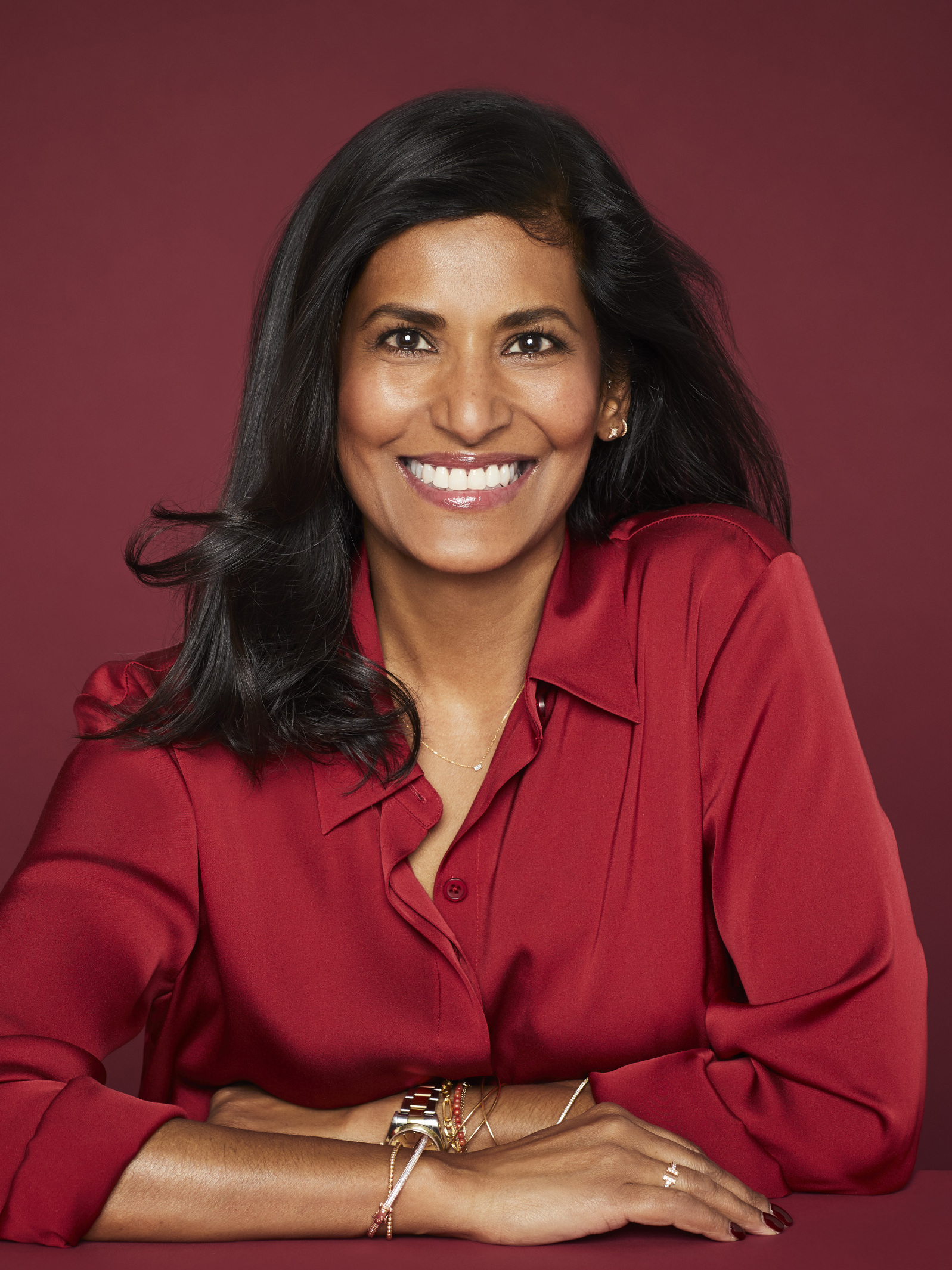
- Hammer in 2019
- Born: 10 December 1961 (age 64); Jos, Nigeria
- Education: BA (Hons) Economics
- Alma mater: City University London
- Occupations: Fashion and beauty makeup artist, entrepreneur, columnist
- Years active: 1990–present
- Agent(s): Angeli & Co
- Known for: Co-founder of Ruby & Millie cosmetics brand
- Spouses: George Hammer (m. 1985; div. 1999) Martin Kuczmarski (m. 2009)
- Partner(s): Martin Kuczmarski (2004–2009)
- Children: 1
- Website: www.rubyhammer.com

Ruby Hammer is a makeup artist and a fashion and beauty entrepreneur. She was awarded an MBE in 2007 for her long-standing contribution to the cosmetics industry.

== Early life ==
Hammer was born to Bangladeshi parents in Jos, Nigeria, her father was a doctor. She emigrated with her family to Britain at the age of 12. Her parents intended to return to Bangladesh (known as East Pakistan at the time), but the Bangladesh Liberation War broke out there while they were on holiday in England in 1971. In 1984, Hammer graduated with a BA (Hons) in economics from City University London.

== Career ==
Hammer's first work with makeup artistry was assisting at London Fashion Week in 1984. After realizing that she could make a living from her hobby, Hammer went on to do the makeup of runway models for designers including John Galliano and Jasper Conran. Hammer has worked as a makeup artist on models and celebrities including Kate Moss, Naomi Campbell, Sadie Frost, Elle MacPherson, Rosie Huntington-Whiteley, and Sharon Stone. Elle, Marie Claire, and Vogue are among the magazines in which her cosmetics looks have appeared.

Hammer has worked on advertising campaigns and television commercials for international brands such as Oil of Olay, Pantene and Head & Shoulders. She has been asked to launch products, advise on new looks and train personnel for Estee Lauder, Clarins, Clinique, Aveda and Revlon. Hammer's television credits include The Clothes Show, BBC Style Challenge, Britain's Next Top Model, GMTV, This Morning, Beautification and 10 Years Younger, where she was the resident makeup artist for 3 series.

In 1998, Hammer teamed up with beauty publicist Millie Kendall to create the Ruby & Millie cosmetics brand, sold exclusively in Boots pharmacies, nationwide. It was the first major UK cosmetics brand to launch in 30 years. In August 1998, the first Ruby & Millie location was opened in Harvey Nichols in Leeds and London. In December 2009, Ruby & Millie launched the teen cosmetics range Scarlett and Crimson.

In September 2011, Hammer launched the cosmetics beauty gifting range "Ruby Hammer Recommends" exclusive to Debenhams. In August 2019, Hammer launched her capsule collection of beauty essentials which led to the industry nominations of 'Best Newcomer' Vogue Magazine, and Best Expert-Led Beauty Brand. Sunday Times Style.

== Awards and recognition ==
- In December 2002, at the launch of the British Asian Fashion Awards held at The Clothes Show, Hammer received an "Outstanding Individuals Award," which pays tribute to an individual or group who has made a significant contribution to the British Asian or mainstream fashion industry.
- In 2007, Hammer was appointed Member of the Order of the British Empire (MBE) in the 2007 New Year Honours for her contribution to the cosmetics industry.

== Personal life ==
Hammer lives in London, with her husband Martin Kuczmarski. She has a daughter, who also works in the beauty industry, and one grandchild. She can speak fluent English, Bengali, Hausa and Hindi.

== Books ==
- Hammer, Ruby; Kendall, Millie. (2000). Face Up: The Essential Make-up Handbook. Ebury Publishing. 978-0091874759.

== See also ==
- British Bangladeshi
- Business of British Bangladeshis
- List of British Bangladeshis
