= George Hammer =

British beauty and hospitality entrepreneur (born 1950)

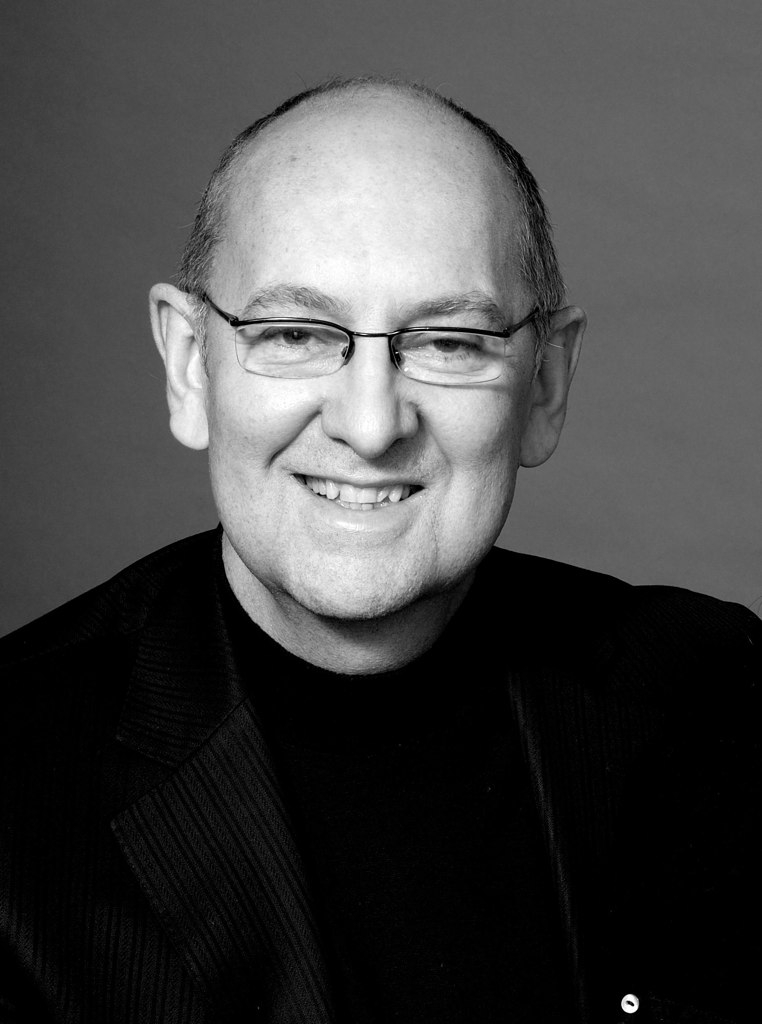
- Born: 3 October 1950 (age 75); Mansfield, Nottinghamshire
- Education: London College of Fashion
- Occupations: Beauty, Hospitality and Property Entrepreneur
- Known for: Founder of Urban Retreat and launching beauty brands to the UK
- Spouse: Ruby Hammer (married 1985 div.1999) Nemri Hammer (married 2004)
- Children: 1
- Parent(s): Anna and Tadeusz Hammer

George Hammer is a British beauty and hospitality entrepreneur, founder of the Urban Retreat brand with its flagship in Knightsbridge.

He is chairman of the London School of Beauty and Makeup and chairs the UK's "Beauty Apprenticeship trailblazer". His "One Events" business has venues in London's West End.

== Early life ==
George Hammer was born to Polish immigrant parents in Mansfield, Nottinghamshire. and graduated from the London College of Fashion in 1971 with a diploma in Clothing Management.

== Early career ==
During the 1970s era Hammer acquired the fledgling Sanctuary business in the old flower market area of Covent Garden, which he developed over the next decade into London's first Urban Day Spa.

He negotiated the UK rights for Aveda in 1993. Then, in 1997, a joint venture with French Provençal beauty brand L’Occitane followed and resulted in the opening of flagship stores across London. Mister Mascara, Ruby and Millie, Tweezerman, Murad, Leighton Denny, Phillip Kingsley, Daniel Sandler Cosmetics and Joan Collins Beauty were other brands that Hammer partnered and developed in the UK.

As of November 2016, despite multiple personal ventures, Hammer is still a partner or trusted investor to a number of niche beauty brands, including Murad, Leighton Denny and Daniel Sandler Cosmetics. He approached Joan Collins and together they created her 'Timeless Beauty' range.

== Urban Retreat ==
In 1999 Hammer sold his Aveda distribution rights to Estee Lauder. Soon afterwards Hammer negotiated 20,000 square feet of space on the Fifth Floor of Harrods, Knightsbridge. Here, he created Urban Retreat, the world's first super-salon concept which opened in 2002.

In 2004 Hammer opened the World's first "Haute Parfumerie" with parfumer Roja Dove to sensationalise perfumery retailing and in 2014 a Moroccan Hammam was opened within Urban Retreat in partnership with the Royal Mansour Hotel in Marakech.

Hammer appointed his daughter, Reena Hammer, to managing Director of Urban Retreat in 2016.

== Hammer Holdings ==
In 2009 Hammer founded cosmetic brand ‘all for eve’ in honour and memory of his sister-in-law, Nadia, who died from ovarian cancer with all of its profits going to the cancer charity 'Eve Appeal'.

In 2010 Hammer started an events division within Hammer Holdings, acquiring premises in Marylebone (One Marylebone), Mayfair (One Mayfair) and a third venue 'One Horseguards Avenue', opened in 2011. In 2012 he acquired the old Buddha Bar premises in Waterloo, renaming it 'One Embankment' and in 2015 One Belgravia was opened in premises at 8/9 Grosvenor Place.

In 2014, Hammer launched with partners Peter Taylor & Jamie Jones The Mayfair Chippy restaurant in North Audley Street. It gained an AA Rosette and entry into the Michelin Guide.

Hammer acquired a major stake in the 'London School of Beauty and Makeup' under Urban Retreat.

== Personal life ==
In 1985 Hammer married make up artist Ruby Hammer; they later divorced in 1999. They have one daughter together, Reena Hammer (born 1986). In 2004 George married Nemri Hammer (née Najdi).

== Awards and recognition ==
In 2011, industry body, Cosmetics Executive Women (CEW) UK awarded George with the Special Industry Award

Hammer sits on the strategic board of Habia (Hair and Beauty Industry Authority) and chairs the British Apprenticeship trailblazer for the Beauty Industry.
