= Gemma Sheppard =

British fashion stylist

- Born: Langar, Nottinghamshire
- Occupation: Fashion stylist
- Television: The X Factor; Britain's Got Talent; Strictly Come Dancing; 10 Years Younger in 10 Days

Gemma Sheppard is a British fashion stylist. She works with contestants and presenters appearing in the British television series The X Factor, Britain's Got Talent, Dancing On Ice and Strictly Come Dancing. Sheppard appears in the British television series 10 Years Younger in 10 Days as the resident fashion expert.

== Early life and education ==
Sheppard grew up in Langar, Nottinghamshire. She attended Toot Hill School in Bingham, Nottinghamshire. She later studied at the Guildford School of Acting. Nottinghamshire County Council gave Sheppard a scholarship for her studies.

== Career ==
Before working in television, Sheppard worked with Alexander McQueen and Gucci. The British television series The X Factor employed Sheppard in 2009 as a stylist for the singer Dannii Minogue. In 2011 Sheppard styled outfits for Tulisa, another judge on the show. Sheppard volunteered to dress the singer for a widely publicised court appearance in 2014. Sheppard later became the style director for The X Factor in 2014. She gained a reputation for styling contestants and judges in top designer brands. In 2015 Sheppard claimed she sourced an original pair of moon boots from Michael Jackson's Thriller music video for a performance on the show by contestant Louisa Johnson. Sheppard also worked as the lead-stylist for both Britain's Got Talent and the British television dance contest Strictly Come Dancing during this time. As of 2021, Sheppard is the resident fashion expert in the British television series 10 Years Younger in 10 Days.

== Personal life ==
Sheppard is married and has three children.
