= Poly Implant Prothèse =

Defunct French company

- Industry: Prosthetics
- Founded: 1991
- Fate: Liquidation in 2011
- Headquarters: La Seyne-sur-Mer, France
- Key people: Jean-Claude Mas (President)
- Number of employees: 120

Poly Implant Prothèse (PIP) was a French company founded in 1991 that produced silicone gel breast implants. The company was preemptively liquidated in 2010 following the revelation that they had been illegally manufacturing and selling breast implants made from cheaper industrial-grade silicone since 2001 (instead of the mandated medical-grade silicone they had previously used).

The hundreds of thousands of unapproved implants sold globally by PIP from 2001 to 2010 were found to have a 500% higher risk of rupturing or leaking than approved models, as well as being implicated in several deaths due to systemic toxicity and several cases of induced breast cancer. The scandal, which produced fears of a massive health disaster, prompted a full recall of the company's implants by the French health ministry in 2010, by which time the company was already defunct.

== History ==
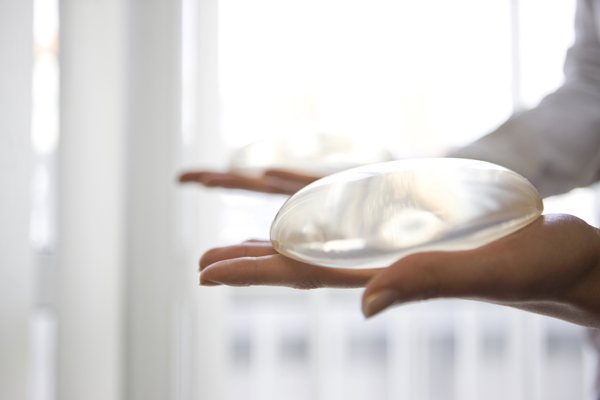
Breast implant

PIP was founded in 1991 by the Frenchman Jean-Claude Mas, born in 1939, a former butcher and later medical sales representative for the Bristol Myers company for 15 years. Mas had previously teamed up with plastic surgeon Henri Arion, who had introduced breast implants to France in 1965. After Arion died in a plane crash, Mas went on alone and launched PIP in 1991.

== Scandal ==
Starting in 1991, the company produced approximately 2 million sets of silicone breast implants over a 20-year period. The implants were exported to Latin American countries such as Brazil, Venezuela and Argentina, Western European markets including Britain (25,000), Germany, Spain and Italy, as well as Australia (8900).

Following the FDA ruling in 2000 which banned silicone breast implants in the US market (leading to a slump in sales worldwide), Mas sought to "tighten PIP's belt" and recoup some of its lost market share by severely cutting costs. In particular, Mas was credited with the idea that by switching PIP's silicone from externally purchased medical-grade to in-house produced industrial-grade, huge savings (on the order of 90%) could be generated that would ensure profits remained high no matter the market. As one PIP engineer later noted, this decision involved a relatively small change in the formula for the silicone, enough so that only superficial differences in the end product were noted. However, none of the relevant regulations were followed for manufacturing medical implants, and no pre-launch tests were conducted.

== Timeline ==
2000: Implant sales in the United States halted by an FDA launched moratorium on silicone implants.

2001: PIP began to use unapproved in-house manufactured industrial-grade instead of medical grade silicone in the majority of its implants.

2003: PIP is acquired by Heritage Worldwide Inc. Regulatory filings show the first signs of legal problems and financial losses.

2009: Concerns surfaced in France first in 2009 when surgeons started reporting an abnormally high rupture rates, resulting in a flood of legal complaints and the company's bankruptcy.

2010: TÜV Rheinland, headquartered in Germany, gave a quality certificate to the production process used by the company until March 2010. However, this didn't apply to the type of silicone used. A former PIP worker and union chief, Eric Mariaccia said, "You had to have been a chemist to have noticed anything". He also said that "The responsible ones aren't the workers but the heads of the company, notably the four who were linked to production and thus responsible for their quality".

2010: In March 2010 PIP was placed into liquidation with losses of 9 million EUR after the French medical safety agency recalled its implants. In a subsequent inspection of the manufacturing site, the company was found to use unapproved industrial-grade, silicone, with a cost of only 10% of an approved gel.

2011: On 20 December French officials say that an action plan is underway following the death of a woman from ALCL. The French government recommended on 23 December 2011 that 30,000 women in France seek removal of breast implants made of a suspect silicone gel by the worldwide exporting PIP firm.

2013: Criminal trial is held in France, and Jean-Claude Mas was sent to prison for four years.

2021: French court found TUV Rheinland negligent and partially liable for damages.

== Issues ==
Medical problems arise when breast implants rupture and cause inflammation and irritation. Further, impure gel may also release toxic substances. Removing implants "carries risks in itself", says the French government. By the end of 2011, eight cases of breast tumours had been uncovered in women after removing the implants, yet, while of concern, according to the French government, there is no evidence of any increased cancer risk.

The UK medical watchdog, the Medicines and Healthcare products Regulatory Authority (MHRA), says France has reported rupture rates of around 5% for PIP implants, compared with 1% in the UK. But a "leading cosmetic surgery firm" has privately warned ministers that the proportion of women at risk is as high as 8%. Symptoms can include lumps around the implant or in the under-arm, inflammation in the breast tissue and a hardening of the breast. Patient UK says French regulatory authority has reported a rupture rate of up to 10%, with a gel leak in 11% of cases.

Nigel Mercer of the British Association of Aesthetic and Plastic Surgeons (BAAPS) says the French move was "certainly not unreasonable" but the British cosmetic surgeon Kevin Hancock said the divergent government responses would cause distress for British women. Plastic surgeon Hancock, of the Liverpool Women's Hospital, says there were concerns in the profession over a high rupture rate and that "We are worried about the rupture risk because it is the rupture that brings the contents into direct contact with the body's tissues... We know that the contents were not what they were supposed to be. So in general we agree with the (French) decision to remove them". The Harley Medical Group, which implanted many of the prostheses in the UK, did not have the capacity to replace implants without National Health Service (NHS) assistance.

Patients are used as "guinea pigs", said Nigel Mercer, a former president of the British Association of Aesthetic and Plastic Surgeons (BAAPS), because medical implants lack the requirement of an independent clinical trial.

The company sold a high-end product that used approved silicone for wealthier clients and which cost five times more than products with silicon gel manufactured in-house. Most PIP implants were manufactured with the in-house silicon. The lawyer, Haddad, representing the founder, said "There is a product made by PIP which did not formally receive the [regulators'] approval and in this regard there was a violation of regulations,". The company did not ask France's medical device safety regulators for approval of their in-house manufactured product, but expected it would have received approval if the company asked for it.

Cancer has been found in 20 women with the allegedly faulty PIP breast implants but French health authorities (Agence française de sécurité sanitaire des produits de santé (AFSSAPS)) insisted there was still no proven link with the disease.

AFSSAPS has as of 28 December 2011, registered 15 cases of breast adenocarcinoma, the most frequent form of breast cancer, one case of breast lymphoma, two cases of other lymphoma, one case of lung cancer and one case of acute myelogenous leukemia in women with the implants.

A French woman with a PIP breast implant where capsular scar tissue formed in the breast, which is a common occurrence with implants. This tissue developed anaplastic large-cell lymphoma (ALCL), a rare form of cancer that affects the immune system cells. The cancer caused death in this case and caused the French authorities to act.

During the 672 registered preventive extractions, in 43 cases (6.4%) the implants had ruptured and in 14 cases (2.1%) they were "oozing", AFSSAPS said.

The PIP implants have been resold as "Rofil M-implants". British Association of Aesthetic and Plastic Surgeons (BAAPS) believes many British women may have had the bad Rofil M-implants used when they bought cut-price breast enlargement surgery from clinics in Eastern and Central Europe.

The PIP factory was shut down and their products banned after it was found they had used the chemicals Baysilone, Silopren and Rhodorsil in their implants. These chemicals are normally used as fuel additives or in the manufacture of industrial rubber tubing.

In 1993, there was an availability crisis of silicone materials for use in medical long-term implant applications. In 1993, Mas ordered the staff to "hide the truth" and "We did it for 13 years without a problem". The PIP gel cost 5 EUR per litre while the authorized American gel Nusil cost 35 EUR per litre. The PIP implants were made with 75% non-authorised gel and 25% Nusil. "The material was better than that used to make the officially authorised gel," Mas said. "Usually, from 1997 onwards we hid the products used to make the PIP gel. I wasn't allowed to buy these products because they were not authorised. We organised everything to escape being monitored."

Investigators interviewed Mas on 18 and 19 November 2010 after the French health authority AFSSAPS discovered the PIP breast implants did not conform to regulations. They passed the case to a judge who ordered a police inquiry for "aggravated deception".

== Chest, testicle and buttock implants ==
The bad silicone has been used to make male chest, testicle and buttock implants as well. "Three people were specially trained to work with a machine that made silicon testicles'" said a former PIP worker.

Most of the male chest, buttock and testicle implants were exported to Latin America.

== Impact per country ==
=== France ===
The French government recommended per 23 December 2011 that 30,000 women in France seek removal of breast implants made by PIP. For women that want to keep their implants, the state will pay for a six-month ultrasound scan.

French public health care funds will be used to finance the recommended implant removals, at a cost estimated at 60 million EUR. New implants will be paid for in cases where they were used initially for medical reasons, others will need to finance a new implant by themselves. Associations representing women with PIP implants demand that public funds cover all cases. "This announcement is just a smokescreen and the victims of PIP are angry," said Alexandra Blachere, head of the association of PIP implant users in France.

A government hotline has been set up by December 2011.

=== United Kingdom ===
In Britain, there are an estimated 30,000–40,000 affected women. The chief Medical Officer Dame Sally Davies said, "Women with PIP implants should not be unduly worried. We have no evidence of a link to cancer or an increased risk of rupture. If women are concerned they should speak to their surgeon". Removing the implant "carries risks in itself," she said.

Concerns were filed with the UK MHRA in 2009 when a lump was found during a mammogram and ultrasound scan in a female patients breast but no action was taken by MHRA at the time.

Shadow Health Secretary Andy Burnham said private clinics in Britain that fitted PIP implants must be forced to pick up the cost of removing them.

On 6 January 2012, NHS officials began to offer examinations and possible removal – in instances where a doctor ruled that necessary. They also called on private medical centers to offer the same deal to patients who had paid for private sector cosmetic surgery.

On 8 January 2012, The Sunday Times reported that leading cosmetic surgeon Jan Stanek had conducted a study with colleague Mike Berry into PIP implants. Their report to the Journal of Plastic and Aesthetic Surgery revealed that, in an audit of 453 patients, between 16% and 34% of the PIP implants ruptured. This compared to a failure rate of less than 1% in other implants.

=== Republic of Ireland ===
Around 1,500 Irish women received PIP implants in Shandon Street Hospital in Cork and Clane General Hospital in County Kildare. The implants were removed free-of-charge by the Health Service Executive.

=== Germany and Brazil ===
Germany's medical safety board and Brazil's health watchdog called for users of PIP implants to visit their doctor for checks.

On 6 January 2012 Germany's Federal Institute for Drugs and Medical Devices recommended the removal of PIP breast implants as a precaution.

=== Netherlands ===
The bad breast implants were sold to about 1,000 Dutch women under the name "M-implants" by the Dutch importer Rofil. The Dutch healthcare spokeswoman Diana Bouhys said, "We have advised them to consult their physician", but also declined to disclose the name of the company. PIP was the third largest maker of breast implants in the world.

=== Sweden ===
Approximately 5 000 implants have already been sold, corresponding to an estimated 2,500 Swedish women with the controversial implants. Nine clinics in Sweden has sold them says Gert Bruse of the Swedish Medical Products Agency (Läkemedelsverket) told the Dagens Nyheter (DN) newspaper this week. The agency also recommends that the implants to be removed.

Sweden banned the company's implants in March 2010, along with many other European countries, when it was discovered that substandard silicone gel was causing unusually many implants to burst. "We've had cases where the implants have burst in Sweden, but it's fewer than in France in relation to how many women have these implants in both countries... Implants shouldn't burst and they shouldn't have an irritating effect that spreads throughout the body. What this company has done is criminal, simply put." said Bruse. PIP's implants have only been used in cosmetic breast augmentation surgery, not in reconstructive surgery.

=== Finland and Estonia ===
In Finland only seven women were given PIP implants; all implants were imported from Sweden by the same surgeon. The Society of Finnish Plastic Surgeons was advising to remove the implants in January 2012.

Patients from Finland often visit Tallinn in Estonia to get cosmetic surgery. In October 2011 (two months before the ban on 22 December 2011), a Finnish woman in her 30s had received a different implant than what was agreed to in advance. An M-implant with the same type code as the implant from PIP was inserted instead of a promised Allergan implant. At least two Estonian clinics operating in Tallinn have offered M-implants as recently as December 2011.

According to the Estonian Health Board, 364 patients were installed with PIP and M-implants. PIP-implants were used by two clinics: Villa Medica and KT Kliinik OÜ, where these breast implants were installed to 163 patients. M-implant implants were installed in 2004–2009 in KT Kliinik OÜ and Plastilise Kirurgia OÜ clinics to 139 patients. In 2011, M-implants have been installed by KT Kliinik OÜ to 61 patients.

=== United States ===
Documents filed with the US government show that implants were sold until May 2000 through Heritage Worldwide, when the FDA launched a moratorium on silicone implants. At the time, the US market accounted for 40% of Heritage Worldwide's revenues, or 3 million EUR, according to corporate documents filed in 2009 with the U.S. Securities and Exchange Commission (SEC). In 2007 significant losses started as both users and distributors filed complaints. Between 1996 and 2009, PIP was targeted by several dozen lawsuits in the United States, filed by users and business partners, claiming breach of contract or unmet payments. Starting in 2003, dozens of women began filing lawsuits mainly for product liability against PIP. However, as of 2009, no trial date had yet been set. Many of the lawsuits were later dismissed.

=== Italy ===
On 29 December 2011, Health Minister Renato Balduzzi said that hospitals and clinics are required to compile a list of women who has received breast implants from PIP. Clinics that did not use any PIP implants should also be required to send a declaration stating that.

=== Czech Republic ===
The Czech Republic health ministry said about 2,000 women with potentially faulty implants should have them removed.

=== Iceland ===
According to the Icelandic Directorate of Health, 440 women underwent breast surgery where PIP breast implants were used. The Ministry of Welfare have stated that health insured women will be offered counsel and ultrasound examination, free of charge. The Ministry of Welfare also stated that in the event that the implant is leaking, the government will pay a portion of the cost to have it removed.

=== Latin and South America ===
- Costa Rica – breast implants banned and taken off the market in March 2010
- Brazil – taken off the market in 2010, banned on 30 December 2011
- Bolivia – implants replaced free of charge for some women on 29 December 2011
- Venezuela – promised to remove them free of charge
- Ecuador – sales banned on 29 December 2011
- Argentina, Chile and Colombia – banned

Argentina, Chile and Colombia – banned. In Colombia, one of the countries with the highest growth in medical tourism, lawsuits were filed against the Colombian State for violation of the precautionary principle by the health regulatory authority INVIMA for authorizing the use of PIP implants whose quality had been questioned by the FDA. Civil lawsuits were also filed against doctors and health institutions for placing implants without patients' informed consent or without disclosing quality deficiencies compared to other approved implants. Under Resolution 258 of 2012 issued by the Ministry of Health and Social Protection, the Colombian State — through FOSYGA (now ADRES) — assumed the costs of removal surgery when risk or rupture was demonstrated. However, replacement with new implants was not covered unless specific reconstructive conditions were met.

=== Iran ===
Ministry of Health and Medical Education banned the breast implants and took them off the market in 2012. They advised women that used the products to consult with a doctor and if deemed a health threat, to have them removed.

=== European Union ===
The adequacy of regulations on silicone-filled breast implants, investigation by the regulatory authorities and advice given to women implanted with PIP silicone pre-filled breast implants was criticized in December 2012 in a report examining information publicly available from the regulatory authorities.

== New company ==
A new firm has been registered under the name France Implant Technologie (FIT), with Mas' son Nicolas Lucciardi, 27, and daughter, Peggy Lucciardi, 24, at the address of their mother, Dominique Lucciardi, who was Mas' former civil partner.

The local paper Nice-Matin obtained the business plan in which Mas is named as a "technical-commercial consultant" to the company and described as "a creative genius". Two former PIP managers were listed in senior positions in the company. With the objective to export implants to the "European, South American and Chinese markets". An investment of 2 million EUR was planned to put the former PIP plant back into operation, aiming to manufacture 400 implants a day with about 20 workers. However, Nicolas Lucciardi said that the project had collapsed due to media coverage of the scandal, adding, "That's obvious".

== Legal process ==
The lawyer Yves Haddad represented Mas. Legal complaints have been filed by 2,500 women in France and 250 women in Britain. Mas was wanted in Costa Rica for "life and health" offenses, a warrant issued by Interpol.

By February 2011, TÜV Rheinland sued PIP, claiming it had been "thoroughly and continuously misled" regarding the silicone used. Many executives are expected to face charges of aggravated fraud in an ongoing court case in France, expected to be scheduled for October 2012, which carries the possibility of prison terms of up to five years. The death of a cancer victim who had such implants may result in more serious charges of involuntary manslaughter.

Frédéric Van Roekeghem, general director for La Caisse Nationale d'Assurance Maladie (French state social insurance agency, CNAM), will go to court regarding the complaints of bad implants. A criminal charge will be made within a few days he said to TF1 on 25 December 2011. The decision has been made in consultation with minister of health, Xavier Bertrand.

Mas underwent a difficult surgery regarding a vascular problem that prevents him from walking said his lawyer Haddad. Sources say a Marseilles court could soon announce fraud charges against four to six former PIP employees.

A fraud case was filed against PIP on 30 December 2011 by France's state-run health insurance fund (CNAM) officials in Marseille announced. Which is near the company's laboratory at La Seyne-sur-Mer. On 26 January 2012 at just before 07:00 the founder Mas was arrested in the home of a friend in the Six-Fours in the Var located in South of France and taken into custody. Investigators searched the house. A deputy chief executive was also arrested at his home.

Philippe Courtois, a lawyer represents 1 300 women in France. Laurent Gaudon, represents four women and say a surgeon should inform about complications from both the surgery and devices used.

Nathalie Lozano, lawyer, represents more than 1 400 women from Colombia, Argentina, United Kingdom and Venezuela. She claims TÜV Rheinland's gross negligence in the process of certifying the quality process.

On 17 April 2013, the trial of 5 executives in begun in Marseille, France. Those charged are the company founder Mr Mas, who was booed in the court, his deputy Claude Couty, the quality director Hannelore Font, technical director Loic Gossart and products chief Thierry Brinon. They face up to five years in prison. The trial was expected to last until 17 May.

On 10 December 2013, Jean-Claude Mas was sent to prison for four years, and was fined 75,000 euros (£63,000) by a court in Marseille, France. The court also ordered TÜV Rheinland to pay 4,000 Euros to each victim. TUV Rheinland was responsible for issuing safety certificates to PIP following annual inspections. Mas died in 2019.

In May 2021, a French court affirmed that German firm TÜV Rheinland was partially liable for damages. TUV Rheinland was responsible for issuing safety certificates to PIP following annual inspections. Mas told police that "... employees would remove evidence of the industrial silicone gel before TUV Rheinland made its annual inspections." The court held that TUV Rheinland was negligent in not detecting the fraud.

== Aftermath ==
British Association of Aesthetic Plastic Surgeons (BAAPS) says that poor postmarketing surveillance is the root of the crisis, and proposes significantly more stringent monitoring of all medical devices including breast implants and all cosmetic injectables, via compulsory, regular reporting of adverse effects and mystery shopping. Professor Sir Bruce Keogh, the NHS Medical Director, will look into whether the cosmetic surgery industry needs to be more effectively regulated.

== See also ==
- Health crisis
