= Altez =

Residential skyscraper in Singapore

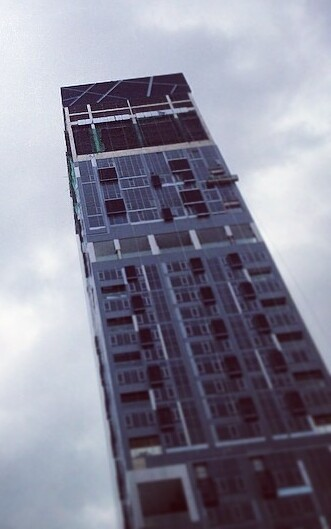
- Interactive map of the Altez area

General information
- Type: Residential
- Location: Tanjong Pagar, Singapore, 16 Enggor Street, Tanjong Pagar, Singapore 079717
- Coordinates: 1°16′28.2″N 103°50′39.5″E
- Completed: 2014

Height
- Roof: 250 m (820 ft)

Technical details
- Floor count: 62
- Floor area: 3,036 m^{2} (32,680 sq ft)

Design and construction
- Architect: RSP Architects
- Developer: Far East Organisation

Other information
- Number of units: 280

Website
- https://www.fareast.com/altez

Altez, is one of the tallest skyscrapers in Singapore and tied for the tallest residential building with Skysuites @ Anson. The building sits at the city centre of Tanjong Pagar, Downtown Core.

== Background ==
The building was completed in 2014. The structure is primarily made from poured concrete and steel. It is 250 m (820 ft) tall and is 3,036 m^{2} (32,681 sq ft). Altez is tied for the 7th tallest building in Singapore.

== See also ==
- List of tallest buildings in Singapore
- Architecture of Singapore
