= Waiting III =

Sculpture in Taipei, Taiwan by Val, a French artist

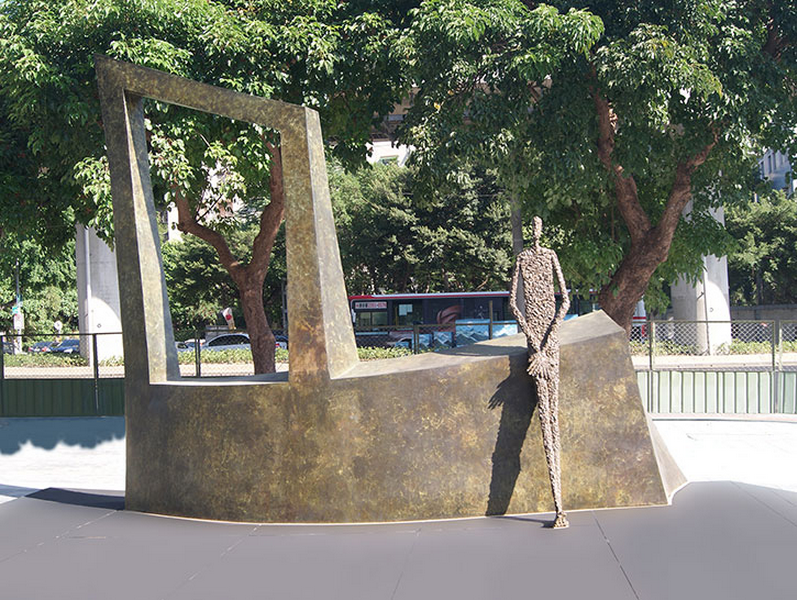
- Artist: Val
- Year: 2014
- Type: bronze
- Dimensions: 487 cm × 400 cm (192 in × 157 in)
- Location: New Times Square, Taipei

Waiting III is a bronze sculpture by French artist Val. The piece can be seen at New Times Square in Taipei where it has been on public display since 2014.

== Description ==
The enlargement of this piece was a matter of new thinking at every step of the process in order to finally achieve the balance at a larger-scale. The work depicts an attitude, rather than the representation of humanity in its generality or than a portrait.

"The man is waiting there in silence. What does he expect? Will his expectation be fulfilled? Query on his fate. Phases of doubt and daring, hopeful interiority."
