= London Welbeck Hospital =

UK private hospital

Geography
- Location: 27 Welbeck Street, London
- Coordinates: 51.5182°N 0.1496°W

Organisation
- Care system: Private
- Type: Specialist

Services
- Speciality: Cosmetic surgery

History
- Founded: Early 20th century

Links
- Website: www.londonwelbeckhospital.co.uk

The London Welbeck Hospital is a private hospital at 27 Welbeck Street, London.

== History ==
The hospital was established in the early 20th century as a maternity hospital. Famous people born in the hospital included Sarah Ferguson in October 1959. It was relaunched by Dr Reza Ghanadian as a facility specialising in cosmetic surgery in the early 1990s.
