= Nicky Hambleton-Jones =

South African television presenter

- Born: Nicolette Hambleton-Jones; 24 February 1971 (age 55); Pretoria, South Africa
- Occupations: TV host, stylist
- Known for: 10 Years Younger
- Spouse: Robert Green (m. 2006)
- Children: 2
- Website: http://www.nhjstyle.com;

Nicolette Hambleton-Jones (born 24 February 1971) is a South African television presenter and stylist best known for hosting the British makeover show 10 Years Younger.

== Early life ==
Hambleton-Jones was born in South Africa. She earned an honours degree in dietetics before starting her own private practice in Cape Town. She then took a postgraduate business course at Wits Business School, before moving to London in 1996, where she worked as a marketing consultant in the city. After being made redundant in 2001 she founded the personal stylist consultancy NHJ Style.

== Career ==
In 2003, Hambleton-Jones began presenting 10 Years Younger on Channel 4. During that time, she worked as a brand ambassador for a number of retail brands. In 2008, she set up the NHJ Style Academy, providing training and development for aspiring personal stylists and for retailers with personal shopping departments. Hambleton-Jones lives in London with her husband, Robert, and has two children.

== Bibliography ==
Hambleton-Jones has published five books:

- Top to Toe: The Ultimate Guide to Becoming Who You Want to Be
- 10 Years Younger in 10 Days
- 10 Years Younger Nutrition Bible
- How to Look Gorgeous
- Bolder Not Older: Dull to Dazzling in 12 Weeks
