= Elspeth Probyn =

Australian academic (1958–2025)

- Born: 21 January 1958
- Died: 7 April 2025 (aged 67)

Academic background
- Education: Concordia University

Academic work
- Institutions: University of Sydney

Elspeth Probyn (21 January 1958 – 7 April 2025) was an Australian academic. She was most recently Professor Emeritus of Gender and Cultural Studies at the University of Sydney. She was a Fellow of the Australian Academy of the Humanities, and Fellow of the Academy of Social Sciences in Australia.

== Early life and education ==
Probyn was born 21 January 1958. In a 2019 Feminism & Psychology interview, she spoke of growing up in an army family and moving frequently. She described her father as upper middle class and her mother as a Canadian whose own father had been "a staunch socialist". Probyn credited her father's concern that she and her sister speak in English accents appropriate to their class status with having awakened her early awareness about class differences. Probyn attended state schools.

== Career ==
Concurrently, Probyn held positions as adjunct professor of cultural geography at the University of Western Australia and as adjunct research professor at the University of South Australia. She received her Doctorate in Communications from Concordia University, 1989. She lectured and published in fields including cultural studies, media studies and sociology, with a particular focus on food, sexuality and the body. She had taught in Canada and the US.

== Main works ==
Probyn's work helped to establish several new areas of scholarship – from embodied research methods to cultural studies of food. Probyn wrote several monographs and over a hundred articles and chapters across the fields of gender, media, and cultural studies, philosophy, cultural geography, anthropology and critical psychology.

In her first book, Sexing the Self, Probyn explored how "feminist reflexivity" emerges from the experience of affective dissonance produced when an individual's way of knowing (epistemology) conflicted with the way they are able to be in relation to the world (ontology). Clare Hemmings argues that Probyn's understanding of reflexivity points to alternative ways of promoting political transformation by building solidarity around feminist activity rather than through limiting motivations related to self-preservation and identity politics.

In Blush: Faces of Shame, published in 2005, Probyn investigated the productive aspects of shame and its capacity to generate new relational ethics. Explaining her conceptualisation of shame as a productive affect, Probyn wrote:

When one feels shame it is a profound intra-subjective moment that has the capacity to undo something of the person - that provokes a deep psychic emotional disturbance, which is productive in every sense. Feeling shame produces a new sense of self even if it only momentary; it produces a profound reflection on the self.

Her most recent research included questions about the sustainability of food production and consumption from an ethnographic and cultural perspective. This draws from previous work on embodiment, gender, sexuality, ethics and cultural practice. Her exploration of these issues drew from contemporary debates about the more-than-human realm and the power of non-human agents and agencies.

== Personal life and death ==
Probyn died on 7 April 2025.

== Publications ==
- Sexing the self: gendered positions in cultural studies, 1993, ISBN 978-0-415-07356-1
- Sexy bodies: the strange carnalities of feminism, 1995, with E. Grosz, ISBN 978-0-415-09803-8
- Outside Belongings, 1996, ISBN 978-0-415-91584-7
- Carnal appetites; FoodSexIdentities, 2000, ISBN 978-0-415-22305-8
- Blush: faces of shame, 2005, ISBN 0-8166-2721-5
- Eating the Ocean, 2016, ISBN 978-0-8223-6213-5 and ISBN 978-0-8223-6235-7
