= 10 Years Younger in 10 Days =

- Genre: Reality
- Presented by: Sonia Kruger
- Country of origin: Australia
- Original language: English

Production
- Executive producers: David Galloway; Sonia Wilkes

Original release
- Network: Seven Network
- Release: April 21, 2009

Related
- 10 Years Younger (British TV series); 10 Years Younger (American TV series)

10 Years Younger in 10 Days is a reality makeover show that was broadcast on the Seven Network in Australia in 2009. The series is presented by Sonia Kruger and is based on the British series 10 Years Younger.

The show premiered on 21 April 2009 and rated 1,348,000 viewers and came in fifth position for the night, a particularly strong result given its 9:30pm timeslot.

== Premise ==
With the help of experts the participants of the show are given a complete make over in an attempt to make them look 10 Years Younger in 10 Days. At the start of the program the person's age is guessed by people on the street and an average is taken. From this average the target image is set. At the end of the show this happens again to see the results.

== Experts ==
- Sonia Kruger – Host
- Will Fennell – Grooming
- Troy Thompson – Hair Stylist
- Jane Johnston – Stylist
- Julianne McGuigan – Hair Stylist
- Cathy Savage – Beauty and Make-Up
- Ken Thompson – Stylist
- Dr Warwick Nettle – Health Professional/Plastic Surgeon
- Dr Fadi Yassmin – Health Professional/Cosmetic Dentistry
- Dr David Carr – Health Professional/Cosmetic Dentistry
- Andreas Lundin – Health Professional/Personal Trainer

== See also ==
- 10 Years Younger (British TV series) on Channel 4
- 10 Years Younger (American TV series) on TLC.
