= Urban Life =

- Artist: Val
- Year: 2010
- Type: bronze
- Dimensions: 220 cm × 500 cm (87 in × 197 in)
- Location: Shanghai Art Fair, Shanghai

Urban Life is a bronze sculpture by French artist Val. In 2010, this monumental piece was exhibited in front of the Shanghai Art Fair and presented to the Jing'An International Sculpture Project.

== See also ==
- List of public art in Washington, D.C., Ward 6
