= Norra Hälsinglands Järnväg =

Former railway in Sweden

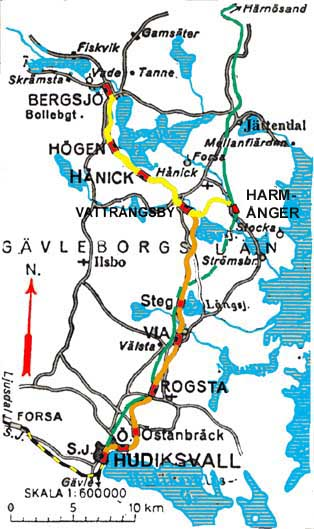

Overview
- Locale: Hälsingland

History
- Commenced: 1896
- Closed: 1962

Technical
- Track gauge: 1,435 mm (4 ft 8 1/2 in) standard gauge
- Old gauge: 891 mm (2 ft 11 3/32 in) (Swedish narrow gauge)

Norra Hälsinglands Järnväg (NHJ) (English: Northern Hälsingland Railway/Northern Helsingland Railway) was a narrow-gauge (891-millimetre (35.1-inch)) railway between Hudiksvall and Bergsjö in northern Gävleborg County, Sweden, in operation from 1896 to 1962. It was often called Bergsjökoa.

== History ==
The mayor of Hudiksvall made a proposal in 1890 for a railway between Hudiksvall and Bergsjö. A concession was granted in 1892 for a 600-millimetre (24-inch) narrow gauge railway with aneast estimated building cost of SEK 870,000. For an additional SEK 30,000, an 891 mm gauge railway could be obtained and the concession for the change was established on August 16, 1895. Northern Hälsingland Railway Company (NHJ) was formed on October 30, 1894 and the articles of association were adopted on March 1, 1895. The concession was transferred to the company and construction started in 1895. The track was opened for public transport on December 13, 1896. The posted building cost in 1912 was SEK 745,000 and the vehicle cost SEK 179,000. There were three steam locomotives, four passenger coaches and 56 freight cars.

At the same time as the route was planned, Hudiksvalls Trävaruaktiebolag planned the construction of a sawmill in Högen to cut the timber that floated on the trail from Hassela. NOJ offered Trävarubolaget to build a station in Högen and to lend 600 metres (2,000 ft) of rail. The mill was constructed and transport of timber from there to Hudiksvall harbor for export was important for the NHJ's economy.

== Development ==
As early as 1911, a preliminary agreement was signed between NOJ and the East Coast Line (OKB) that OKN would buy NOJ by paying the debts and giving the shareholders in NHJ shares in OKB. The reason was that in OKB's concession it was written that consideration would be given to the negative impact on NHJ. The stretch of Hudiksvalls-Via would be part of OKB and the narrow-gauge line would be closed. Via-Bergsjö was to be a line run by OKB. It was, until September 1, 1927, before the NHJ was purchased by OKB.

The standard-gauge OKB was rebuilt through Hudiksvall city to the south of Rogsta and parallel to the NHJ to the north of Steg where a viaduct was built over the NHJ and further to Edsäter east of the town of Harmånger. A new 4 kilometres (2.5 mi) narrow gauge railway was built from Edsäter on OKB to the south of the station Harmånger on the NHJ. NHJ was closed between Hudiksvall and the connection of the track from Edsäter. The rails were torn up in 1928 and then reused on the newly built part to replace the heavier rails which could instead be used on the standard gauge section. In connection with the opening, Edsätter station was renamed to Harmånger and the former Harmånger station on the NHJ changes to Vattrångsby. The new 20-kilometre (12-mile) stretch for NHJ: became Harmånger - Vattrångsby - Bergsjöand, and was incorporated into the East Coast Line's organization. On November 1, 1927, the East Coast Line was opened for public transport and the traffic on the NHJ between Hudiksvall and Vattrångsby was closed down simultaneously.

In order to reduce the cost of transhipments, OKB acquired four narrow-gauge transfer flatcars for the transport of standard-gauge cars.

OKB had large debts and on August 1, 1933, OKB including Harmånger-Bergsjö was purchased by the Swedish state and incorporated into the National Railways (SJ) organization. The narrow gauge railway between Harmånger and Bergsjö became the first 891 mm gauge railway operated by the National Railways.

Bergsjö saw the loss of its direct connection to the port of Hudiksvall when the connection was via transhipment in Harmånger. In addition to wood transport, wood waste from the sawmill had since 1916 gone to the port in Hudiksvall and on to the sulphate and sulphite factory in Iggesund. The Högen sawmill ceased operations in 1928. The timber that had been sawn was then transported to Håstaholmen in Hudiksvall until in 1941 the forest companies agreed to change timber when the wood was floated on to Stocka.

During the 1930s, SJ introduced rail buses for passenger traffic and two passenger cars were sold to Dala-Ockelbo-Norrsundets Järnväg, the other two were scrapped. During the Second World War, the steam locomotive was able to handle passenger traffic with wagons from the narrow-gauge network in Småland. The last of the original locomotive was scrapped in 1955. The remaining steam locomotive (SJ) and the Z4p locomotive were both equipped for compressed air brakes and when the remaining car park received compressed air brakes no longer needed the brake.

== Settlement ==
When OKB bought NHJ, a future conversion to standard gauge was included. The Swedish state was given this responsibility at the takeover of OKB and according to a parliamentary decision in 1945 it would be rebuilt.

Traffic declined, there was no conversion to standard gauge, and on January 1, 1962, the Harmånger-Bergsjö railway line was closed. The last train was pulled by a former Öland locomotive—SJ 3052— was crowded with people who for the last time traveled by train to or from Bergsjö.

== Current ==
The remaining cars are now on Anten-Gräfsnäs Railway. In Bergsjö, as the only memory of NHJ, there is the open freight car set up in Hembygdsparken. The former embankment can be followed on the Economic Map from 1956 and traces of it are still in nature.

== Literature ==
- Brun, Julius & Frisk, Edvard; Om norra Helsinglands förbindande medelst jernväg med stambanan i Ljusdal, ur allmänna synpunkter betraktadt (About Northern Helsingland's connection by rail to the main railway line in Ljusdal, viewed from a general point of view), Hudiksvall, 1883, LIBRIS-ID 2580182
