= Space and Culture =

- Discipline: Geography, urban sociology, cultural studies, architecture
- Language: English
- Edited by: Joost van Loon, Justine Lloyd, Michael Schillmeier, Rob Shields

Publication details
- History: 1997-present
- Publisher: SAGE Publications
- Frequency: Quarterly
- Impact factor: 1.373 (2020)

Standard abbreviations
- ISO 4: Space Cult.

Indexing
- ISSN: 1206-3312
- LCCN: 99301909
- OCLC no.: 535496255

Links
- Journal homepage; Online access; Online archive

Space and Culture is a quarterly peer-reviewed academic journal covering the fields of cultural geography, sociology, cultural studies, architectural theory, ethnography, communications, urban studies, environmental studies, and discourse analysis. The editors-in-chief are Joost van Loon (Catholic University of Eichstätt-Ingolstadt), Justine Lloyd (University of Technology), Michael Schillmeier (Ludwig-Maximilians-Universität München), and Rob Shields (University of Alberta). It was established in 1997 by Rob Shields (then at Lancaster University), who also published the journal. Since 2001, it has been published by SAGE Publications.

== Abstracting and indexing ==
Space and Culture is abstracted and indexed in International Bibliography of the Social Sciences, Scopus, Sociological Abstracts, and ZETOC.
