= Val (sculptor) =

French sculptor

Valérie Goutard
- Born: 20 May 1967
- Died: 27 October 2016 (aged 49)
- Known for: Sculpting
- Spouse: Frédéric Morel (m. 2009)

Valérie Goutard (20 May 1967 – 27 October 2016) was a French sculptor who used VAL as her artist's name.

== Early life and education ==
Val, was born in Boulogne-Billancourt, Hauts-de-Seine. Her parents were Nathalie Goutard and Jean-Claude Goutard, an engineer working for a large oil company. Because of her father's position, she shared her childhood between Europe, Africa and South America. After studying literature and advertising, she worked in marketing until 2001.

== Career ==
In 2002 a friend, Florence Jouglard, an auctioneer and artist, enticed Val to try to sculpt from clay. Working on clay with her own hands, Val felt a revelation, a kind of "love at first sight" for this activity which she perceived as an extension of her inner world. "It was like a revelation, a sort of resurgence of a long-buried memory. My love for sculpture, the material and the volume was born in a completely immediate fashion", she said during an interview in 2014. During two years, Val took art lessons in Paris and then, in August 2004, went to settle in Thailand, where she began working with bronze. Working with this material, Goutard, who took the artist's name of VAL, and emphasized her self-learning. Her relative lack of culture in visual arts brought her, she said, "a freedom vis-à-vis the masters".

One of her early works, Miss Trendy, produced in 2004, is a simple 40 centimeters high feminine character, with striking posture, gracefulness and proportions. VAL's works quickly became more elaborate. An early theme was the relationships between a human being and their environment. Many of her early works represent one or several people who are interacting with a given space, represented by a few elements: a bench, a vertical structure or a staircase. This theme of the harmony, of the "balance in the imbalance" was one of the important part of her work. "Finding a kind of balance which emerges with a notion of hope, a fragile balance which also expresses hope", she said. Linked to this theme, also emerged the idea of a journey, of a path on which man progresses, sometimes alone, sometimes along with companions. The idea of a chain appeared, which became a recurring theme during VAL's career, notably in her very last artwork, Du chaos à la sagesse (From Chaos to Wisdom). "We are alone with our own imaginary world and, at the same time, I find in a very curious way that, when we open and look outside, we see that many people, in an isolated way, are going in the same direction. And for me, I have the impression to participate to a chain which completely overtakes us", she explained.

In 2008, the Wellington Gallery in Hong Kong displayed some of her works: it was the first international gallery which got interested by VAL's art pieces. After this, the same gallery organized several solo exhibitions in 2009 and 2010.

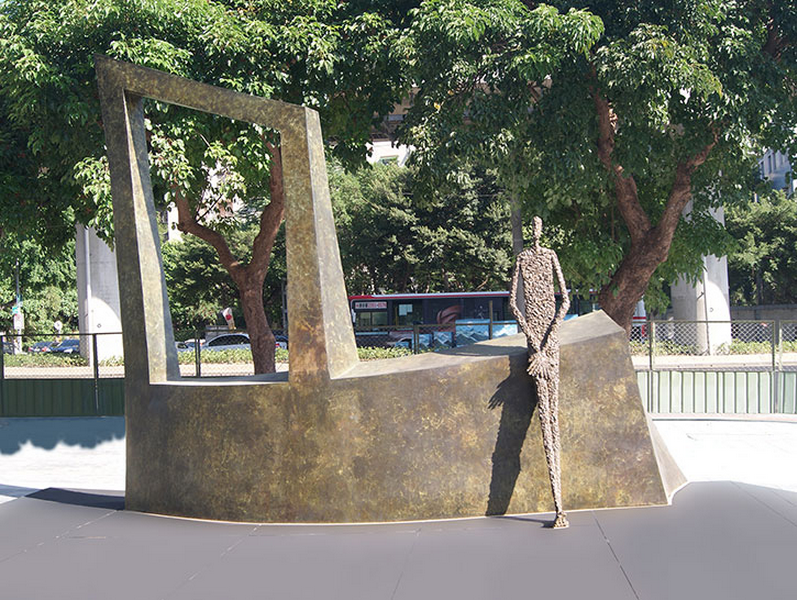
Waiting III, Taipei

After her marriage in 2009, VAL set up a work team, composed of Thai artisans in a workshop in northeastern Bangkok. VAL and her team had her bronze works cast at the Fine Arts Foundry of Ayuthaya. Through the years, she acquired a vast experience while working with the 160 artisans of this foundry, who also worked for other artists. The welding of the bronze pieces was done at the Bangkok workshop – a crucial stage where the orientation of a character, the positioning of hands or the degree of inclination of a head would give to the work its final expression. Several galleries were actively supporting and promoting VAL's works, most prominently the Philippe Staib Gallery in Shanghai and Taipei and the RedSea Gallery in Singapore. The founders of these two galleries, Philippe Staib and Christopher Churcher, who progressively became close friends with VAL and Frédéric, played a crucial role in VAL's career and organized numerous exhibitions of the artist's works, in Taiwan, Beijing, Shanghai, Singapore, Kuala Lumpur and New Delhi.

In 2010 VAL created an artwork named Urban Life for the Jing’An International Sculpture Project in Shanghai. With a height of five meters, it was VAL's first monumental art piece; a new challenge for the artist who, up to then, had worked on pieces not higher than one meter. Urban Life is a series of twisted frames, on which are perched characters with long and thin arms and legs in various attitudes, seating as if plunged into deep thought, walking precariously, running or meeting each other. "I had to enlarge by six times the original sculpture I did. It is a very important step for a sculptor to have the opportunity to do such a big piece", she said in an interview at the fair. The change of scale required to rethink the artwork in order to find a new balance between the characters and the architecture.

In the same year, VAL was invited to participate to the Shanghai Art Fair. Alongside a solo exhibition of her works, Urban Life was displayed in front of the building where the Art Fair was taking place : it was VAL's first public installation.

This art piece was an important new step for VAL at several levels. First at a technical level: her sculptures became monumental, which forced her and her team to answer a new series of challenges in terms of conception, moulding and assemblage. "To keep the rightness of the feature during the transformation, to preserve the fragility of human destiny on sculptures weighing several hundreds of kilos are bets, which are both intellectual and technical", she wrote in a note in March 2013. In parallel, VAL confronted new challenges, as with her 2 meters 25 centimeters-high sculpture Inle Balance III produced in 2012, which represents a character perched on an imaginary embarkation and directly inspired by the fishermen of the Inle lake in Burma – a perfectly balanced artwork with which the artist considered that she had "overtaken the law of Newton".

Then, and it is probably the most important, a new theme emerged in the artist's work, the theme of "monumental fragility" - an expression that she would employ often in her public presentations. The characters are not anymore only these figures that we can lay down on a table, but large, lanky and faceless characters, sometimes perched on top of stairs, sometimes strolling across frames made of solids and voids or hanging as if suspended in mid-air. "How to preserve the lightness and the poetry in a sculpture several meters high?", she wondered during a public presentation in November 2015. For the artist, the answer laid in the "understanding of what constitutes the strength and the specificity of the artwork, in order to stress the strong points. This requests extreme rigor, an answer to new requirements". VAL described this period as a "formidable time of maturation".

From 2011 on, the artist's reputation spread internationally. After the first temporary public installation in Shanghai in 2010, VAL had multiple permanent installations of her works in Bangkok, in Taiwan (Taipei and Taichung) and in Singapore. She exhibited her artworks in China, Taiwan, Malaysia and in Singapore, but also in France, Holland, Belgium and England.

In March 2016, the Art Museum of the Central Academy of Fine Arts of Beijing (CAFA) organized a large exhibition of the artist's artworks under the name "Anatomy of a creative path", with the support of the Philippe Staib Gallery. This same exhibition had been displayed in November 2015 at the foundation Yishu8, in the buildings of the former Chinese-French university in Beijing. In her opening speech for the exhibition, VAL explained her vision. "My work is like a dive, a listening to vibrations, to my inner palpitations, to a rhythm which seems to get tuned in with nature, to an echo", she said. She underlined also that her sculptures are "a proposal" and that she offers neither answers, nor certainties. "I look for the momentum which will be crystallized at a certain time by a feeling of balance, of rightness, of harmony as we can feel sometimes that some moments are good", she added. CAFA acquired two of VAL's art works, Eternal Pillars and Autoportrait, for the permanent collection of its museum.

The artist maintained an humble attitude vis-à-vis her artworks and her public. She considered that the most important when one sees a sculpture is that "there is an emotion which surges from it" and that "a dialogue" is established between the person who watches and the object being watched. "Passersby at exhibitions and art fairs often approached VAL who, while answering their questions, was listening to their comments with the humility of a great artist hiding humbly behind her creations. She was listening and learning from all", wrote Philippe Staib, founder of the Philippe Staib Gallery. An avid reader fascinated by literature – she particularly liked the writings of François Cheng -, VAL had the rare ability to perfectly express herself through the words in her writings and through the forms in her art works. One was especially struck by her sincerity, her goodness and her deep humanity: attentive to everyone, very affective, she always tried to establish a dialogue, to create a meaningful exchange with her interlocutors.

After almost ten years of success and an enormous artistic production, VAL felt the need to renew her inspiration. She would first venture into a new path by launching a project which was both original and eco-friendly: installing bronze sculptures on the sea bed near the island of Ko Tao in southern Thailand. The idea came from a desire of a new artistic experience as well as from a motivation to contribute to protecting the environment. Installing three large bronze characters leaning on concrete walls would allow bits of broken corals, ripped away accidentally by divers or by natural incidents, to grow again, as they need to be fixed on some spot off the ground to be able to develop. The NGO New Heaven Conservation Program, specialized in the protection of the sea bed, took care of the ecological side of the project.

In parallel, VAL wished to explore a new dimension of the interaction between her creations and nature with this outstanding public installation. "I love the interaction of nature with sculpture. With this project, nature and sculpture will be even more intermingled, because the corals will themselves become the sculpture", said VAL in an interview. The project was a logistical challenge: the sculpture and their concrete base were weighing each over two tons. Moreover, the undersea currents forced the team to use a system of rails to stabilize the bronze characters once they were installed with the help of a crane on the sea bed at a depth of 12 meters. But the project finished in March 2016 was a success, and, as soon as the sculptures were installed, fishes and plankton adopted them immediately.

The second path walked down by VAL to diversify her artistic approach was to integrate a new medium to produce her artworks. After some research, she opted for the glass of Murano, produced since the end of the 13th century by the venerable master-blowers on this Italian island located in the lagoon of Venice. During several months, VAL worked with these master-blowers in their workshop on the island. She submitted her drawings to them and intervened during the process when bronze elements were inserted into the glass being molded or when potassium powder was being injected. For the artist, it was a new approach: contrary to bronze sculptures, which are produced in a foundry on the basis of wax molds, the glass doesn't allow any mistake. The fabrication process of the glass, brought to a heat of 1,400 degrees, only lasts a few seconds. During the process, VAL intervened sometimes to change the initial idea, based on the inspiration of the moment. "It is a mix between intuition and rigor", she said.

Once in Thailand, the pieces were reworked through the addition of new elements, allowing to finish the artwork. The combination of bronze and glass opened the way to play with shades and light, with voids and reflections, bringing a new dimension to the artist's work. Glass was the tenth material used by VAL since her first experiences with clay. VAL's death, on 27 October 2016, occurred during the preparation of the exhibition of her works of bronze and glass. The exhibition opened at the Red Sea Gallery in Singapore on 11 November 2016. VAL had wanted to name this exhibition The Tenth Eonian Initiative – an anagram for The Venetian Initiation.

The last major work of VAL was the most monumental and maybe the most accomplished. It is a masterpiece, 36 meters long and 4 meters 50 high, realized for a Taiwanese art collector and which was installed in 2017 in front of his residence on a hill overlooking the city of Taichung. This artwork is named Du chaos à la sagesse (From Chaos to Wisdom) and represents a sort of philosophical journey through which men are going during their life. "It starts with a scene which is relatively chaotic, with sculptures which seem on the verge of falling down, characters who are under these and fear that the sky falls on their head. And then, there is a journey from going through the challenge to adopting an attitude of self-reflection", VAL explained in an interview in April 2016. The majesty of this initiation journey, the installation of the artwork in a superb location and the depth of the topic make it an exceptional artwork.

In February 2017, during an emotional ceremony at the Benchasiri Park in Bangkok, VAL's artwork Ville fantastique II was officially unveiled in presence of her family, her friends and her admirers. VAL and Frédéric had decided in 2015 to donate this sculpture to the city of Bangkok. "Our desire is to thank the city for everything she gave us and to root us stronger in this city of Bangkok we love", said VAL while announcing the donation in 2015. At the inauguration, Dr Jingjai Hanchanlash, president of Alliance Française of Bangkok, declared that "VAL was born as a French, but died as a Thai", although she did not have dual citizenship. In 2017, the renowned art critic Gérard Xuriguera wrote a seminal article on the artistic work of VAL. "Val is one of these artists who believe in the everlastingness of the emotional charge of the visible. Since her beginnings, she creates very stylized humanistic sculptures, whose symbolic meaning is echoing what is most deeply buried in her. But what she aims above all to capture, as she underlines, are "moments", moments seized on the spot, which she inscribes in the perforated structure of her bronze armatures, of small, middle or large format, which are in accordance with her organizing pulsion and her quest for absolute", he wrote.

During her whole career, VAL was carried by an inner force which guided her in her artistic work and which was linked, not only with nature, but also with the time-honored lineage of the sculptors that preceded her. It is this inner voice which she attempted to transcribe in these artworks, a voice asking questions, but never imposing certainties. At each stage, some progresses were done, some new paths were explored, VAL was advancing on her path or, as she liked to say, on her "equilibrist’s tread". As, for her, creating required boldness, it required to take risks, but, she said, it is when we take risks that "we can feel the strength of life". "Creating is opening doors within oneself", said Val. By sharing her creative works with a large public, the artist allowed others to open doors within themselves.

== Personal life ==
In 2006, VAL met Frédéric Morel in Bangkok who became her agent. Both of them married in 2009. He gave up his work in business to promote VAL's work on the art market.

Through multiple international solo-exhibitions and public installations, VAL became an artist recognized in Asia and Europe. At the end of 2015, she received the Trophée des Français de l’étranger from the French foreign minister Laurent Fabius.

Shortly before the opening of an exhibition of a new series of works at the RedSea Gallery in Singapore, VAL died in a motorbike accident in October 2016 in the Thai province of Chonburi. After her funeral in a Buddhist temple in Bangkok and at the Catholic church of Missions Etrangères de Paris, Bangkok, her ashes were spread on the site of Ocean Utopia, one of her major art works, near Ko Tao.
