= Ultralase =

Healthcare company in Leeds, England

Ultralase Eye Clinics Limited
- Company type: Limited company
- Industry: Healthcare
- Founded: 1991
- Headquarters: Leeds, England, UK
- Key people: Russell Ambrose (CEO)
- Website: www.ultralase.com

Ultralase is a healthcare company based in the Leeds, England, it specialises in vision correction through laser eye surgery.

== Overview and history ==
Established in 1991 by US based ophthalmologist Claus Fichte, optometrist Andrew Bell and business man Christopher Neave, Ultralase were the first to introduce a national network of laser eye surgery clinics in the UK. Following the success of the world's first refractive surgery clinic, opened by US-based investors in Toronto (1989), the UK's first ever laser eye surgery clinic was opened at Clatterbridge hospital, Wirral in January 1991. This clinic was the first to perform laser eye surgery in the UK, and expanded to become the Ultralase network.

Ultralase was purchased by 3i following the £175 million purchase from Corporacion Dermoestetica in January 2008, who had bought the business in May 2005 for £29 million.

After going into administration, in 2013 Ultralase was acquired by Optimax founder and CEO Russell Ambrose for £10 million.

Ultralase is currently part of the Optimax group of companies.

== Concerns raised in parliament ==
Dr. Ashok Kumar, a British Labour Party politician, made a motion on 4 February 2004 concerning laser eye surgery and mentioning Ultralase in the British House of Commons:

Laser eye surgery was developed by the ophthalmologist Dr. Steven Trokel in 1987, and first used on a patient in Germany in 1988. The first laser eye treatment clinic using Dr. Trokel's laser was founded by US-based investors in Toronto in 1989. Following the success of the US operation, the first UK clinic was opened at Clatterbridge hospital, in Wirral, in January 1991. It grew into a string of clinics now known as Ultralase, one of Britain's foremost laser eye treatment providers.

Negligence claims involving laser eye surgery against doctors belonging to the Medical Defence Union have more than doubled in the past six years. The Medical Defence Union is the largest insurer for UK doctors. It believes that, while some of the claims were for faulty surgery, many more centred on patients' unrealistic expectations about what could be achieved. Recent figures released by the union show that claims over laser eye surgery have increased by 166 per cent. in six years and now account for a third of all ophthalmology claims. The MDU has increased its subscription rates for laser eye surgeons and advised them on how to minimise the risk of a claim.

== Controversy ==
When Russell Ambrose acquired Ultralase, its existing patients discovered that Ambrose would not honour their lifetime aftercare guaranteed on purchase.

As a result of an investigation by BBC Watchdog, broadcast on 8 October 2015, in response to the negative publicity, Ambrose agreed to reinstate their aftercare.

== Services ==
Ultralase provides laser and lens implant eye surgery.

== See also ==
- Private healthcare in the United Kingdom
