= 10 Years Younger (American TV series) =

American reality series

- Starring: Kyan Douglas; Josh Greene; Damone Roberts; Jenn MacDonald; Mark Montano; April Barton; Gina Derry; Jorge Ramón; Andy Paige
- Country of origin: United States
- Original language: English
- No. of seasons: 4

Production
- Production locations: Los Angeles; New York City
- Running time: 30 minutes (seasons 1 & 2); 60 minutes (season 3)

Original release
- Network: TLC
- Release: December 1, 2004 – March 27, 2009

10 Years Younger (also abbreviated as 10YY) is an American reality series that aired on TLC from December 1, 2004 to March 27, 2009. It takes individuals and transform them to look more "glamorous", or 'ten years younger', hence the name of the show. As of February 2011, the Oprah Winfrey Network have been airing reruns of the show.

== Production ==
10YY first aired on December 1, 2004 and ran until 2005 when it went on a hiatus. The show returned on January 7, 2008 with a revamped cast, with only make-up artist Damone Roberts returning from the previous cast and Mark Montano from While You Were Out as the host. In August 2008 the fourth season began shooting, to air later in the year, with Kyan Douglas as the new host.

== The steps of 10YY ==
=== Premise ===
The show begins by introducing the participant and their story, which is usually an explanation of why they look older than they are. The participant then stands inside the box — a soundproof clear display case placed along a busy street. The show's host, then invites 100 people to guess the age of the participant. The average of these guesses is then considered the "age" of the participant; the show must try to make them look ten years younger than this average, not their actual age.

=== Makeover ===
The participant is then taken to various experts to undergo non-surgical cosmetic procedures. These usually include straightening, shaping, and whitening for teeth; LASIK or other eye surgery for participants with glasses or bad vision; and a dermatologist to administer procedures ranging from microdermabrasion to botox. Occasionally there will be another expert involved, such as a trainer or career advisor. After these procedures are finished the participant is taken to the "Glam Squad", which includes a hair stylist, makeup artist, and fashion stylist. To give the show an element of surprise, the participant is not allowed to see the entire look, particularly hair and makeup, before the final reveal.

=== Reveal ===
When the makeover is complete, the members of the Glam Squad, along with a family member of the participant, gather for the reveal. Here, the participant is shown a life-sized picture of themselves taken before the makeover. The picture is then removed to reveal a mirror, allowing the participant to see the results of the makeover for the first time, usually an emotional moment.

After the reveal, the participant must return to "the box" for the final verdict. Again, 100 people are asked to guess the age of the participant, then the average of these guesses is announced. The final average is always lower than the first average, usually by at least ten years, as is the show's aim; however, there have been a few instances where the ten-year goal has not been reached.

== Techniques ==
=== Dental ===
- Veneers (laminates)
- Whitening/Bleaching
- Enamel shaping (recontouring)
- Bonding (composites)

=== Dermatological ===
- Erbium Laser Resurfacing
- Flash Lamp Pulse Dye Treatment
- Fraxel Laser Resurfacing
- Intense Photo Light Facial Rejuvenation (IPL)
- Cosmetic filler injection (Restylane)
- Botox injection
- Alpha hydroxy acid (AHA) peel (glycolic acid and lactic acid)
- Beta hydroxy acid (BHA) peel
- Jessner's peel (salicylic acid, lactic acid and resorcinol)
- Retinoic acid peel
- Trichloroacetic acid (TCA) peel

=== Cosmetological ===
- Hair cut & style
- Makeup

== See also ==
- 10 Years Younger (British TV series)
