= Black Peoples Union =

Indigenous Australian anti-colonial organisation (2023)

- Abbreviation: BPU
- Founded: 2022; 4 years ago
- Ideology: Anti-colonialism; Anti-imperialism; Black Power; Marxism–Leninism; Womanism
- Political position: Far-left
- Colors: Black; Yellow; Red

Website
- blackpeoplesunion.org

The Black Peoples Union (BPU) is an Australian-based revolutionary, Indigenous political organisation founded in 2022. According to former president, Keiran Stewart-Assheton, the organisation is "working towards building a pan-Aboriginal movement in Australia, so that we can fight for our self determination and our sovereignty".

Black Peoples Union has been described as a national advocacy group, and initially came to prominence for their "progressive No" stance on the Indigenous Voice referendum. Black Peoples Union held multiple rallies across Australia during the lead up to the referendum, and have been involved in anti-colonial organising in support of Palestine.

Despite Black Peoples Union's stance of "revolution no reconciliation", the group received criticism from other left wing groups, for their stance on the referendum.

== History ==
=== 2023 ===
In February 2023, Black Peoples Union made their position on the Indigenous Voice referendum public. In an interview published by Sydney Criminal Lawyers, BPU president Keiran Stewart-Assheton declared Indigenous Australians "must come together as one force capable of taking revolutionary action to forge our own path" and stated the Voice would "not only achieve no progress for us, but it will actually set us back" and "create the illusion of general consent across the broader Indigenous population", painting those who opposed the Voice as "radical outcasts in the eyes of the mainstream". The position taken by Black Peoples Union, and other grassroots organisations would later come to be known as the "progressive No" vote.

In March 2023, at rallies organised in Meanjin and Naarm, speakers from Black Peoples Union demanded “more than just a voice to Parliament” and called for the “formation of a Union of Indigenous Nations”.

In September 2023, members of BPU reiterated their opinion on the Voice to Parliament and encouraged "allies" to try "standing with us and actually listening to what we have to say".

=== 2024 ===
In January 2024, members of the Black Peoples Union were present at a pro-Palestine blockade at Port Melbourne Docks, where a ship owned by the Israeli-owned ZIM ship was scheduled to dock.

In January 2024, the Black Peoples Union was involved in the reestablishment of Camp Sovereignty in Kings Domain, alongside Robbie Thorpe and Lidia Thorpe.

In February, the former president of the Black Peoples Union, Keiran Stewart-Assheton, spoke at a protest in front of the office of Assistant Minister for Foreign Affairs Tim Watts, urging supporters to take "material action" in the fight against Israel and declaring "any sort of terrorism that we might commit is justified resistance".

=== 2025 ===
In June 2025, BPU released a statement declaring their "unapologetic" support of the Iranian state in the context of the United States strikes on Iranian nuclear sites.
