= March for Australia =

2025 anti-immigration protests in Australia

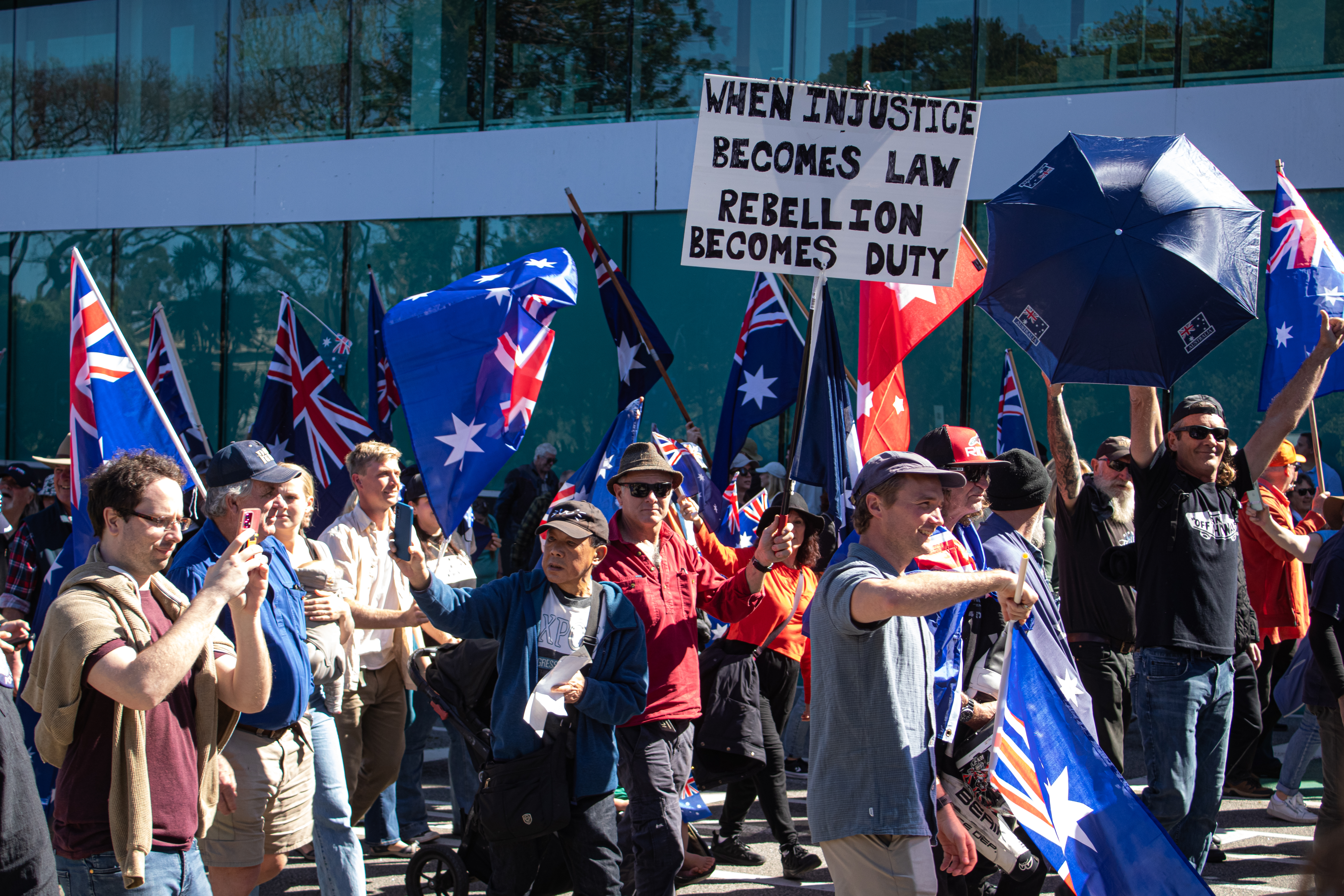
- Protesters march at the August 2025 rally in Perth
- Date: 31 August 2025, 19 October 2025, 26 January 2026 and 30 August 2026
- Time: 12 noon – 2 pm (ACST · AWST · AEST)
- Location: Adelaide · Brisbane · Cairns · Canberra · Darwin · Hobart · Melbourne · Perth · Sydney · Townsville Other small satellite events
- Type: Protest, demonstration
- Motive: Reduction in immigration to Australia
- Participants: 50,000+ protesters and counter-protesters (police estimates)
- Arrests: At least 21 (Note: Adelaide: 3 arrests Brisbane: 2 arrests Perth: 3 arrests Sydney: 1 arrest Melbourne: 12 arrests) (Note: Arrests include both protesters and counter protesters)
- Website: marchforaustralia.org

March for Australia was a series of nationwide protests in many Australian cities that occurred on 31 August 2025, 19 October 2025, 26 January 2026 (Australia Day) and 30 August 2026. The protests aimed to express discontent towards perceived mass immigration in Australia. The protests have been described as far-right and white nationalist by many commentators. Investigations by ABC News and The Age found the organisers of the rallies to have ties to various neo-Nazi and white nationalist individuals, including the National Socialist Network.

The marches were promoted by various politicians and commentators, including One Nation leader Pauline Hanson, One Nation senator Malcolm Roberts, One Nation WA MLC Rod Caddies, federal MP Bob Katter, and the neo-Nazi organisation National Socialist Network. It was reported that the Sydney protest was organised by pseudonymous nationalist figure Bec Freedom.

The protests garnered significant media attention inside Australia and caused concerns among some migrant community groups. Police estimated the number of protesters and counter-protester attendees for the August protest to be more than 50,000 across the country for the initial August 2025 rallies. The October 2025 and January 2026 protests had lower attendance than the August 2025 rally.

== Links between organisers and far-right extremism ==
ABC News Verify reported that organisers of the March for Australia rally had previously shared material associated with white nationalist ideas, including pro-Nazi and pro-Adolf Hitler content. The rally's website initially promoted "remigration", a far-right concept advocating the deportation of non-European peoples from Western countries, but the reference was removed shortly after the site went live.

Researchers have linked March for Australia messaging to broader extremist narratives. Organiser "Bec Freedom" was captured on a recording saying, "We need violence, I'm sorry, but we need fucking violence." When confronted by 2GB reporter Ben Fordham, Freedom later apologised, but she was also recorded in a two hour livestream on Twitter on 11 August, advising people on how to covertly introduce far-right ideas to make them sound more palatable to the mainstream. "... this is how I tried to explain it to somebody. I say, OK, so protect Australian heritage, culture, way of life. Next step, protect European culture, heritage, way of life. The next step is protect white heritage. It all means the same thing." She emphasised that by framing it this way, it would be more acceptable to the Australian public, as she believes that the concept of "Australian" refers only to white people or those with European white heritage.

Kaz Ross, an independent researcher of extremism, said this framing reflected a strategy to obscure far-right affiliations, noting organisers' prior references to "remigration" and "the great replacement", both linked to white supremacist ideology. Political sociologist Joshua Roose of Deakin University told ABC that far-right groups, including neo-Nazis, exploit concerns about migration, crime, and economic insecurity to advance "a much deeper, hate-filled, racist agenda", while emphasising that reasoned discussion on immigration policy remains possible.

In January 2026, an ABC News Verify investigation discovered that those involved with organising the march had encouraged people to join the White Australia Party, the political arm of the neo-Nazi group National Socialist Network.

== August 2025 protests ==
=== Australian Capital Territory ===
==== Canberra – Captain James Cook Memorial ====
Approximately 1,000 people attended the anti-immigration rally in Canberra. The march began at the Captain James Cook Memorial at Regatta Point of Lake Burley Griffin before continuing over Commonwealth Avenue Bridge to Parliament House. One Nation leader Pauline Hanson and One Nation senator Malcolm Roberts were among the speakers at the rally.

It was later revealed that NSN member Zachery Hook had served as an organiser and marshal for the event.

=== New South Wales ===
==== Echuca/Moama ====
An estimated 600 people attended the anti-immigration rally in Echuca/Moama.

==== Newcastle – Foreshore Park ====
An estimated 500 people attended the anti-immigration rally in Newcastle. No arrests occurred at this demonstration.

==== Sydney – Belmore Park ====
An estimated 15,000 people were at the anti-immigration rally in Sydney, with up to 3000 people at a coinciding pro-Palestine march and counter-protest organised by the Palestine Action Group (PAG) according to NSW police. Another smaller counter-protest attracted just under 300 people. The march began from Belmore Park near Central Station to Victoria Park in Camperdown, where speeches were given. NSW Libertarian Party MP John Ruddick was among the speakers at the rally. One woman was arrested in Hyde Park and was charged with breaching the peace. NSW Acting Deputy Police Commissioner Paul McKenna said that NSW force had "worked very closely with the organisers" to lessen any problems that may occur with the march, stating that "they assure us that they want to do things right, that they’re not coming to the city to cause problems or other anti-social behaviours."

=== Queensland ===
==== Brisbane – Roma Street Parklands ====
Police estimated that 6,000 people attended the protest. The march began from Roma Street Parkland and continued to the courtyard of Parliament House and the surrounding City Botanic Gardens. Queensland Libertarian Party president Lachlan Lade was among the speakers at the rally. Queensland Police Acting Assistant Commissioner Todd Reid commended the "overall peaceful behaviour" of the protest with only two people being arrested. One man was arrested and charged with two counts of assaulting a police officer and another was detained for a breach of the peace.

==== Cairns – "Freedom Park", Esplanade ====
According to The Cairns Post, thousands gathered for the march in Cairns. The march began at Freedom Park on the Cairns Esplanade and continued to Fogarty Park, also on the Cairns Esplanade.

==== Townsville – Anzac Memorial Park ====
According to the ABC around 400 people attended the anti-immigration march in Townsville. The march was led by members of the Katter's Australian Party. Former party leader, Bob Katter gave a speech at the march and was joined by Queensland state MPs Nick Dametto and Robbie Katter.

=== South Australia ===
==== Adelaide – Rundle Park ====
South Australian Police estimated that 15,000 people were present at the rally in Adelaide, including both protestors and counter-protesters. The march began from Rundle Park up North Terrace to Parliament House and then onto Peace Park via King William Road. It was ended by organiser Mark Aldridge after being "hijacked" by the National Socialist Network, resulting in an altercation between protesters. Three people were arrested and charged in the protests, two were charged with "wearing articles of disguise" and failing to state personal details and the other for assaulting police.

A marcher at the Adelaide rally was seen holding a placard depicting Dezi Freeman, the alleged perpetrator of the Porepunkah police shootings that had occurred five days before the rally, where Freeman allegedly murdered two police officers and wounded another; at the time of the march, Freeman was on the run from police. The marcher attended a police station a few days later where he was arrested and was initially charged with displaying offensive material in a public place according to a statement by South Australian Police. South Australian Police would later update their statement to say that the man had been charged with offensive behaviour rather than displaying offensive material and would appear before Adelaide Magistrates Court in October 2025. On 28 October 2025, South Australian Police decided that they would not be pursuing a prosecution and would instead issue a formal adult caution notice to the man.

=== Tasmania ===
==== Hobart – Salamanca Lawns ====
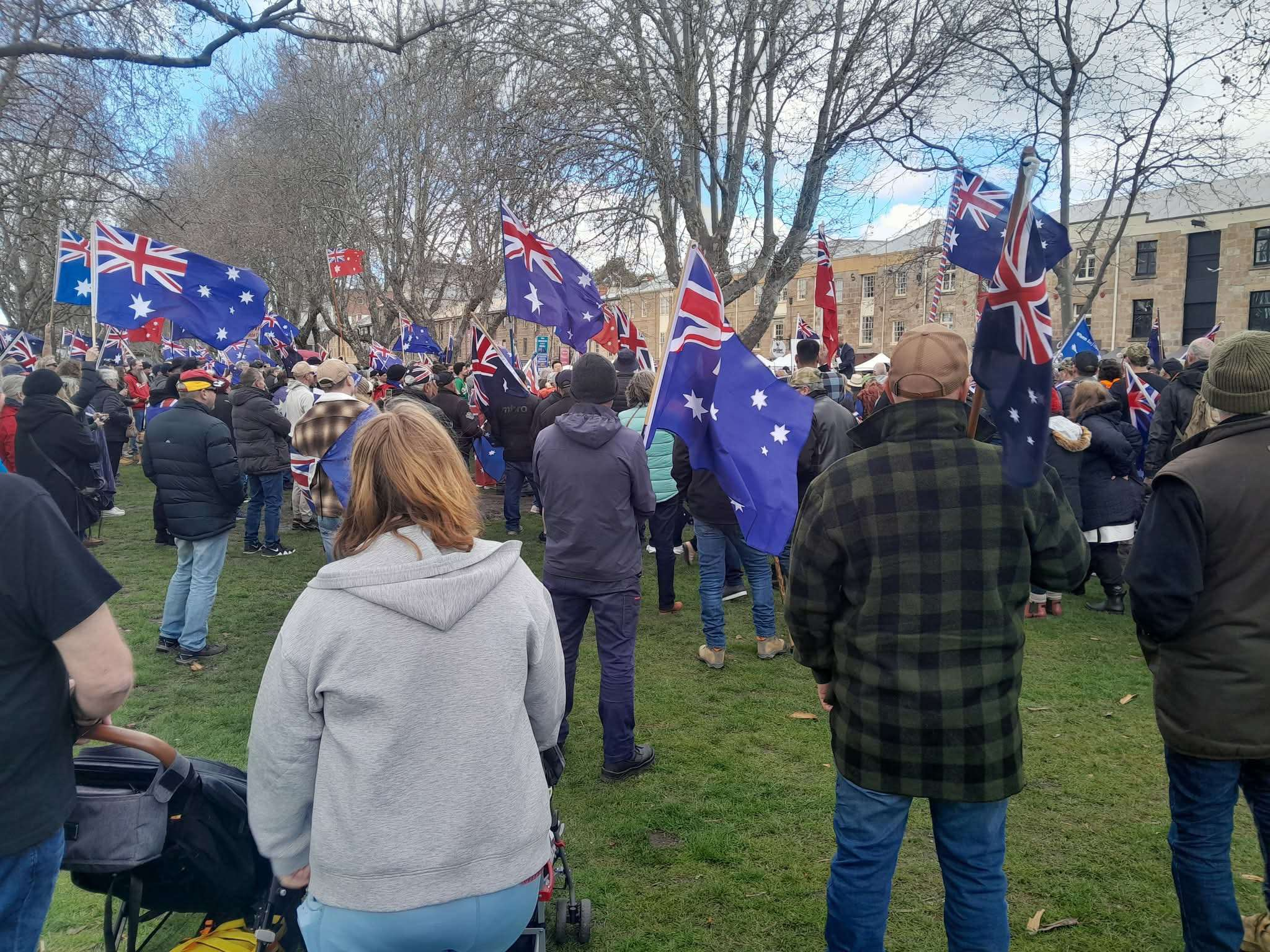
Protesters in Hobart.

Approximately 300 protesters attended the rally. No arrests were made at the demonstration, although riot police were deployed following a clash between March for Australia and Rally for Hope protesters. Notable attendees included the daughter of One Nation leader Pauline Hanson, One Nation candidate for Tasmania Lee Hanson, and City of Clarence councillor and former One Nation candidate Emma Goyne. The March for Australia rally drew a larger crowd than the counter-protest. Smaller, decentralised demonstrations also took place in Launceston, Tasmania.

=== Victoria ===
==== Melbourne – Flinders Street station ====
Police estimated that participants of the March for Australia demonstration and counter-protesters numbered approximately 5,000. Protesters marched from Flinders Street station to Parliament House, where speeches were then given. Thomas Sewell, leader of the National Socialist Network (NSN) was among the speakers at the rally.

===== Camp Sovereignty incident =====
After the protest at approximately 5pm, a group of 40 to 50 men from the NSN, broke away from the remaining protesters and stormed the Camp Sovereignty around the Kings Domain Resting Place memorial. The group of attackers were reported to be armed with pipes and large tree branches, and appeared to target women and older members at the site's encampment, as well as damaging the sacred site. Camp Sovereignty organisers including its founder Krautungalung elder Robbie Thorpe told the ABC that four people were injured in the storming of the camp.

Police minister Anthony Carbines on 1 September 2025 confirmed that Victoria Police and counter-terrorism units were investigating the incident following a meeting with Chief Commissioner Mike Bush, amid calls for it to be classed as a hate crime. Sewell and other members of the NSN were arrested the following day on 2 September 2025, in relation to the incident. Sewell, Nathan Bull, Jake Crokett, Michael Saarinen, Jaeden Johnson, Blake Cathcart and Zack Dewaart subsequently pled guilty to charges of violent disorder. Bull also pled guilty to failing to provide his name and address to police. Cathcart also pled guilty to assault with a weapon. Timothy Lutze had also previously pled guilty, however subsequently died after his plea.

The following Saturday, on 6 September, in response to the attack, Camp Sovereignty hosted Sovereign Day Out, bringing together numerous performers and musicians as well as First Nations cultural displays. The event was attended by several hundred people.

==== Wodonga ====
An estimated 250 people attended the anti-immigration rally in Wodonga.

=== Western Australia ===
==== Perth – Supreme Court Gardens ====
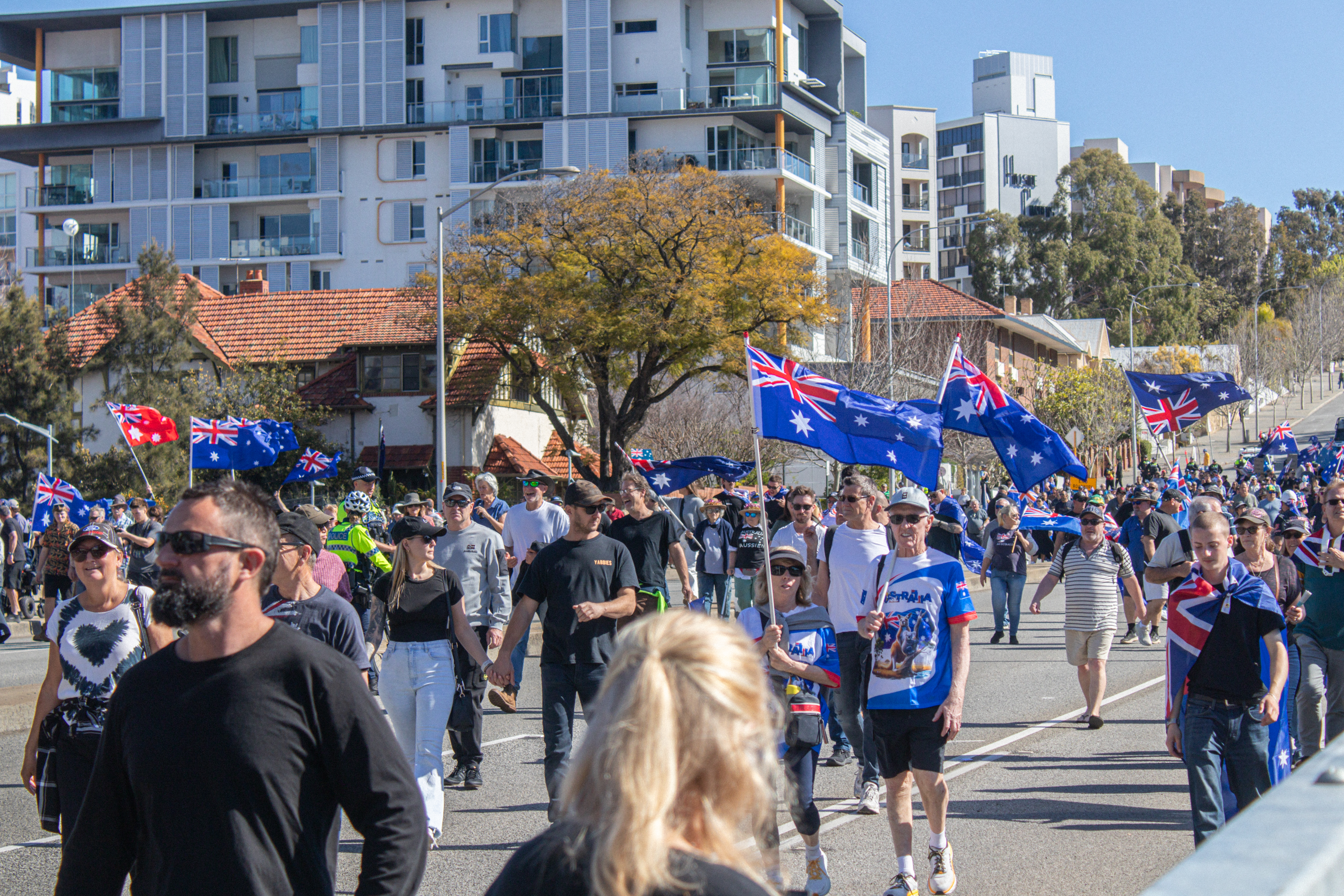
March For Australia protesters in Perth, near Parliament House

An estimated 10,000 people were at the anti-immigration rally in Perth according to Western Australia Police. The march began from Supreme Court Gardens and marched up St Georges Terrace to Parliament House, where speeches were then given. WA One Nation MP Rod Caddies was among the speakers at the rally. Three people were arrested in connection with the protest: two were charged with weapon related offences and the other for assaulting a public officer. A further 13 were issued move-on notices. Perth's rally appeared more subdued than those in the eastern states, with only a few hundred counter-protesters.

== October 2025 protests ==
A second series of March for Australia protests occurred on 19 October 2025.

=== Australian Capital Territory ===
==== Canberra – Captain James Cook Memorial ====
More than 400 attended the anti-immigration rally in Canberra. The march began at the Captain James Cook Memorial at Regatta Point of Lake Burley Griffin before continuing over Commonwealth Avenue Bridge to Parliament House at about 12:20pm according to an ACT Policing spokesperson. A group of counter protesters clashed with the march at the base of the bridge, with police keeping the two groups apart. Two people were arrested but were later released and told to move on from the area.

=== New South Wales ===
==== Sydney – Hyde Park ====
An estimated 5,000 people attended the anti-immigration rally in Sydney. Protesters gathered and listened to speeches in Hyde Park before marching through the Sydney central business district along Margaret, York and Druitt streets, eventually returning to Hyde Park. NSW Police reported that the group was well behaved, with no arrests made and only one protester being asked to move on after temporarily holding up the rally.

A counter-protest was held at Belmore Park, in which about 200 counter-protesters attended. NSW Greens senator Mehreen Faruqi was among the speakers at the counter-protest.

=== Queensland ===
==== Brisbane ====
Several thousand attended the March for Australia rally in Brisbane. Among the speakers at the rally were One Nation senator Malcolm Roberts, Katter's Australian Party leader Robbie Katter, former Katter's Australian Party leader Bob Katter and former Liberal senator and People First Party leader Gerard Rennick. The Queensland Police Service confirmed that three people were arrested—one man during the rally and two women at the counter-protest. According to police, the counter-protest drew around 300 people.

==== Cairns – Fogarty Park ====
According to The Cairns Post, hundreds gathered for the march in Cairns. The march began at Fogarty Park on the Cairns Esplanade and continued into the city streets.

=== South Australia ===
==== Adelaide – Light Square ====
Several thousand attended the March for Australia rally in Adelaide. The rally began at Light Square before marching through the Adelaide city centre. Dozens gathered at a counter-rally held at Victoria Square. A South Australia Police spokesperson stated that both protesters and counter-protesters were well behaved with only a single arrest. The arrest was of a 36-year-old Yankalilla woman for disorderly behaviour and refusal to state name and address.

=== Tasmania ===
==== Hobart – Salamanca Lawns ====
At least 100 attended the March for Australia rally in Hobart. The rally occurred on the Salamanca Lawns of Parliament House. Among the speakers was Lee Hanson. Tasmania Police state that the protest was peaceful with no escalation of tensions between protesters and counter-protesters and no intention from either group to clash.

=== Victoria ===
==== Melbourne – Parliament House Steps ====
At least 800 attended the March for Australia rally in Melbourne. Protesters rallied on the steps of Parliament House where speeches were given before a march towards Flinders street station and back to Parliament House. Victoria Police Commander Wayne Cheeseman described protesters as peaceful and following instructions.

===== Counter protest clashes =====
A counter-protest, initially led by a procession of First Nations people who marched from Camp Sovereignty, saw at least 800 participants congregate at the State Library before attempting to make their way to Parliament House to confront March for Australia demonstrators. On route some of the counter protestors clashed with Victoria Police, with Victoria Police Commander Wayne Cheeseman estimating that 50 “hardcore protesters” were responsible for most of the violence. Cheeseman condemned counter protesters who clashed with officers. Further, he described rocks, bottles filled with shards of glass and rotten fruit being thrown at police; and further stated that bins and flags were lit on fire by the counter protestors. Victoria Police officers used tear gas, capsicum spray, stun grenades and rubber bullets to repel the counter protesters near Spring Street after they attempted to confront March for Australia demonstrators. Police advised that two of their officers were injured in confrontations with counter protesters; a sergeant suffered a suspected broken hand after being kicked and a senior constable with a cut to the leg. Victoria Police said that one woman had been arrested and that further arrests were likely to be made with police still looking for up to 20 people allegedly responsible for the violence. Two men were later arrested in late November 2025 and charged with assaulting police and hindering police at the counter-protest.

=== Western Australia ===
==== Perth – Langley Park ====
Several hundred attended the March for Australia rally in Perth according to the ABC. The march began from Langley Park and into the city.

== January 2026 protests ==
March for Australia held a series of nationwide protests in several Australian cities on 26 January 2026 (Australia Day). The rallies coincided with Invasion Day protests.

Approximately 2,000 people attended the Sydney rally. Signs support jailed National Socialist Network member Joel Davis were carried by some protestors at the front of the Sydney protest. Organiser Bec Freedom stated that she had agreed to let neo-Nazis act as marshals for rally, telling the protest that "I know not all of you guys like them, I know that. But they're good people who are fighting for our country, they agreed with our cause and they came to help [keep people] safe" Attendees chanted "heil Australia" when National Socialist Network leader Thomas Sewell was mentioned in a speech.

Following a speech he gave at the Sydney protest Brandan Koschel was arrested and charged with inciting hatred through an antisemitic speech. Police told the court that Koschel was a member of the recently disbanded NSN. He was refused bail after police argued that he posed a risk to community safety due to his association with the organisation.On 18 February 2026, Koschel pleaded guilty and was sentenced to 12 months in jail.

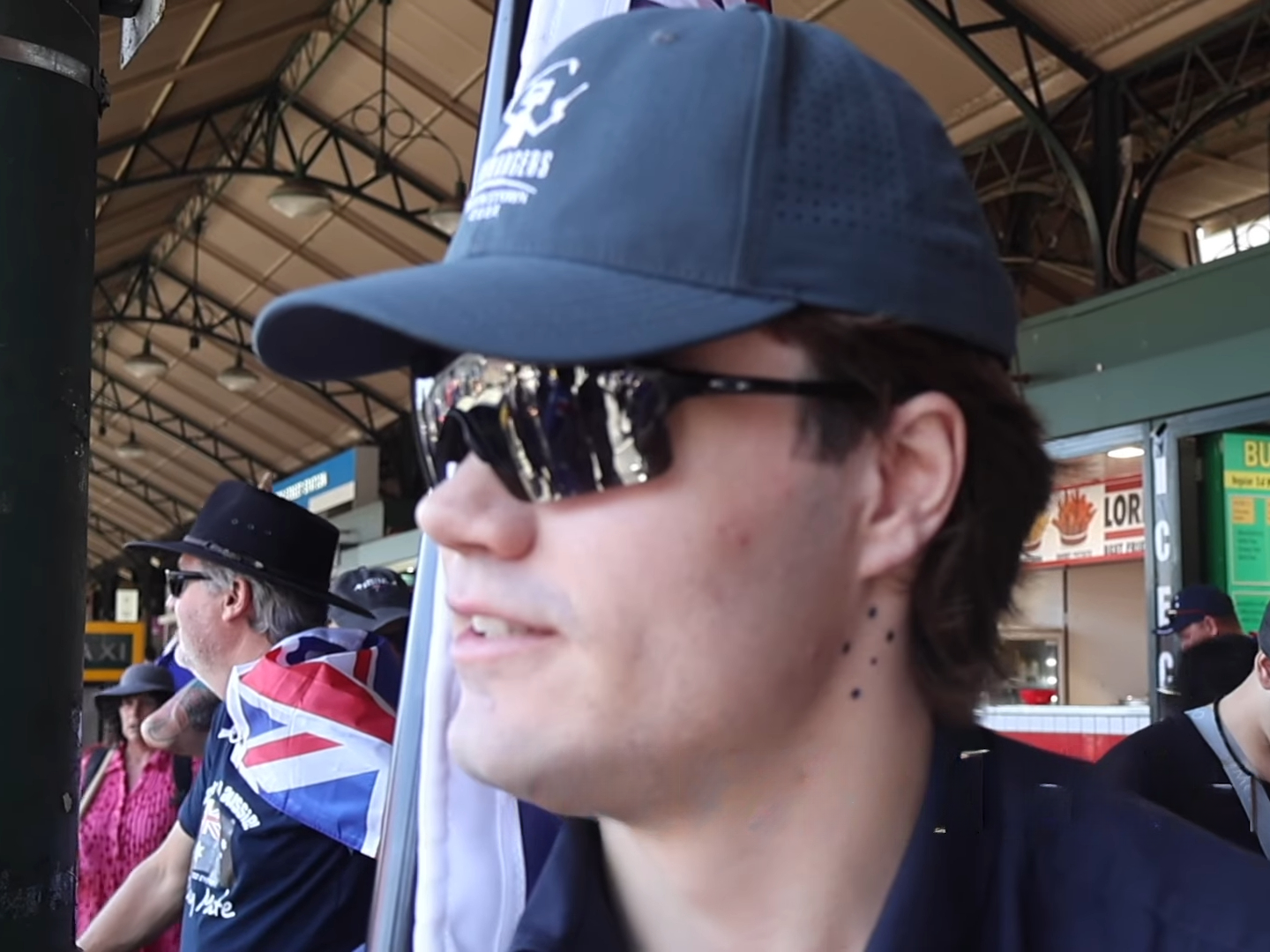
Hugo Lennon, aka Auspill, organiser of the Melbourne protest being interviewed during the event.

There were 2,000 protesters in Melbourne. Attendees at the protest shouted "Heil Hugo" when a speech was given by far-right Hugo Lennon. 500 protestors attended the Perth rally. Attendees at the Invasion Day protest in Perth, were directed by police to disperse after a dangerous object was thrown into the crowd. One Nation politician Rod Caddies attended the Perth rally, where he told the crowd that he wanted to ban foreign ownership of Australian land. The protest also featured a speaker from the now defunct National Socialist Network.

The Brisbane rally was attended by One Nation politicians Pauline Hanson and Malcolm Roberts and Victorian Senator Ralph Babet. There were 3,000 protestors at the rally. There were rallies at the Gold Coast and Surfers' Paradise where 1,500 and 300 attended respectively. Several hundred attended the Adelaide rally and 300 attended at the Canberra protest.

== Reactions ==
Some leaders of immigrant communities warned community members to stay inside and avoid the protests in case of potential violence. Federal parliamentarian Bob Katter held a press conference on 28 August, in which he expressed support for the protests. He was asked a question by a Nine News reporter about Katter's Lebanese heritage, to which Katter responded by threatening to punch the reporter in the mouth.

The Australian government noted their concern surrounding the protests and called them "Un-Australian". Prime Minister Anthony Albanese responded to Katter's comments, saying, "You're speaking to someone called Albanese. We've got a Senate leader called [Penny] Wong. Migration enriches. Except for the First Australians, we're all either migrants or descendants of them."

Elon Musk shared a post on Twitter that incorrectly claimed that 150,000 people attended the August Brisbane and Sydney protests. Police estimated that attendance at those protests was 21,000. Hoodoo Gurus performer Dave Faulkner condemned the use of the band's song "What's My Scene?" to play Senator Pauline Hanson onto stage at the January 2026 Brisbane rally. Faulkner, who wrote "What's My Scene?", suggested that bands should be able to restrict the use of their music by any political cause, unless they agreed.

== See also ==
- 2005 Cronulla riots
- Reclaim Australia
- 2025 British anti-immigration protests
- Irish anti-immigration protests
