= Camp Sovereignty =

Australian protest movement

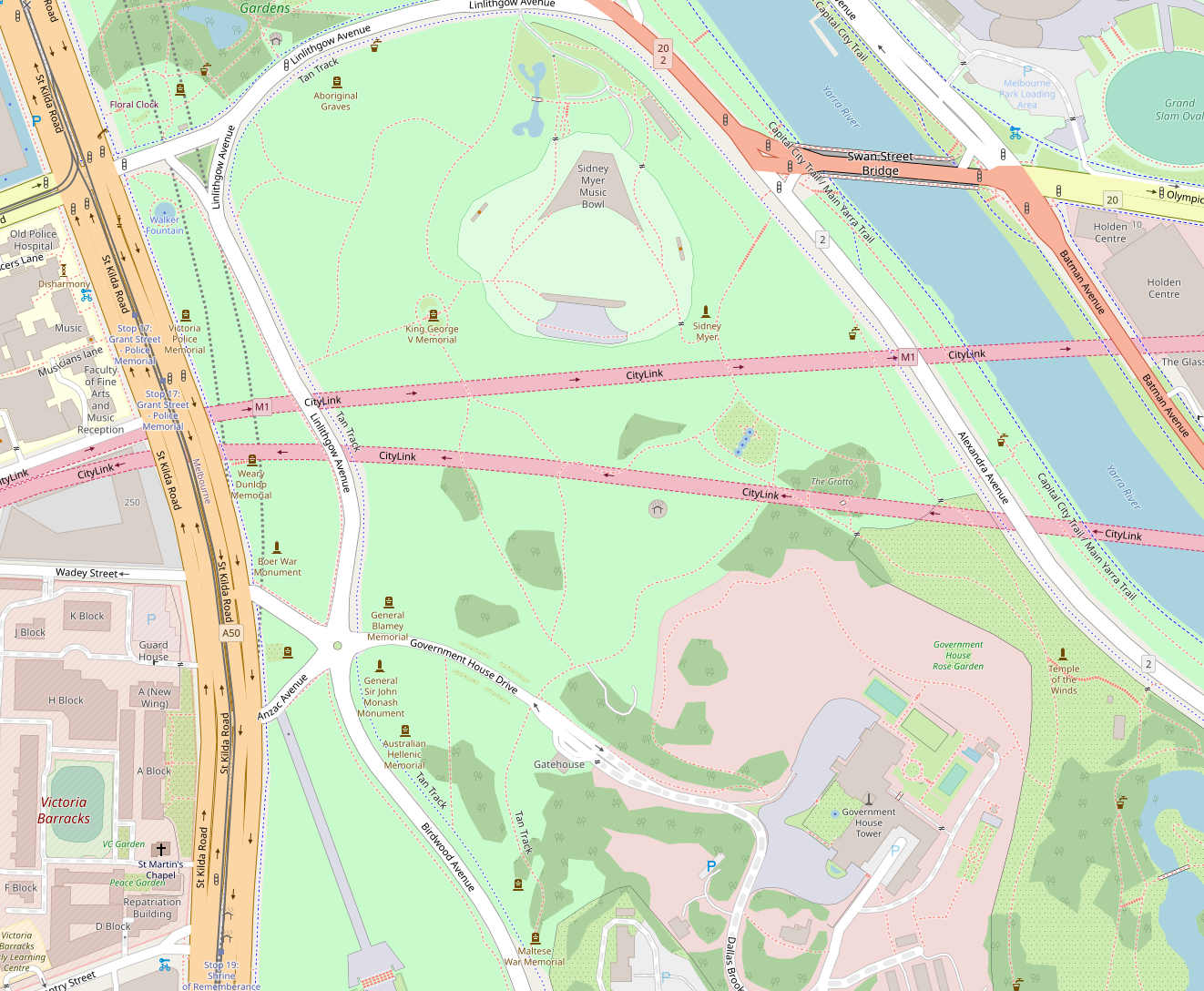
- King's Domain Victoria
- Location: King's Domain, Melbourne, Australia
- Type: Demonstration
- Theme: Aboriginal and Torres Strait Islander rights
- Organized by: Marg Thorpe, Robbie Thorpe, Gary Foley, Robert Corowa

Camp Sovereignty is the name given to an Aboriginal and Torres Strait Islander protest movement established as part of the "Black GST" political movement. GST stands for ending genocide, acknowledging sovereignty, and securing treaty. The camp has existed as two iterations, one in March 2006 and one in January 2024. On 12 March 2006, a camp was established and a ceremonial fire was lit at the Kings Domain Resting Place, Melbourne, which is also a sacred site also used as a burial ground for repatriated remains of Aboriginal people. This camp was previously used to protest against the 2006 Commonwealth Games, referred to by the protesters as the "Stolenwealth Games" in reference to the negative treatment of Aboriginal and Torres Strait Islanders by the Commonwealth.

After the conclusion of the Commonwealth Games, the central emphasis of the camp shifted towards the ceremonial fire. Robert Corowa, one of the leaders of the protest, argued that the fire was sacred because of the central place of fire in Aboriginal traditions and ceremony. Under legal threat and the protest of over 100 people it was eventually quenched on 10 May 2006. However several sister fires have been lit in Redfern, Dandenong, and Framlingham to continue the protest.

These events have also guided other Australian protests, such as the Camp Freedom rally on the Gold Coast during the 2018 Commonwealth Games. The events of Camp Sovereignty have also been sourced as inspiration for future Indigenous activists and leaders from this notable and large-scale protest.

The 2024 camp has the additional goal of receiving ownership of the land around the memorial for use as a community space by the Indigenous community. Camp Sovereignty places emphasis on maximising media coverage nationally and internationally to so that Indigenous Australian civil rights issues would be understood by the global population. Further commentary through the form of podcasts and documentaries have continued to promote and acknowledge the impacts of the Camp Sovereignty movement.

== Background ==
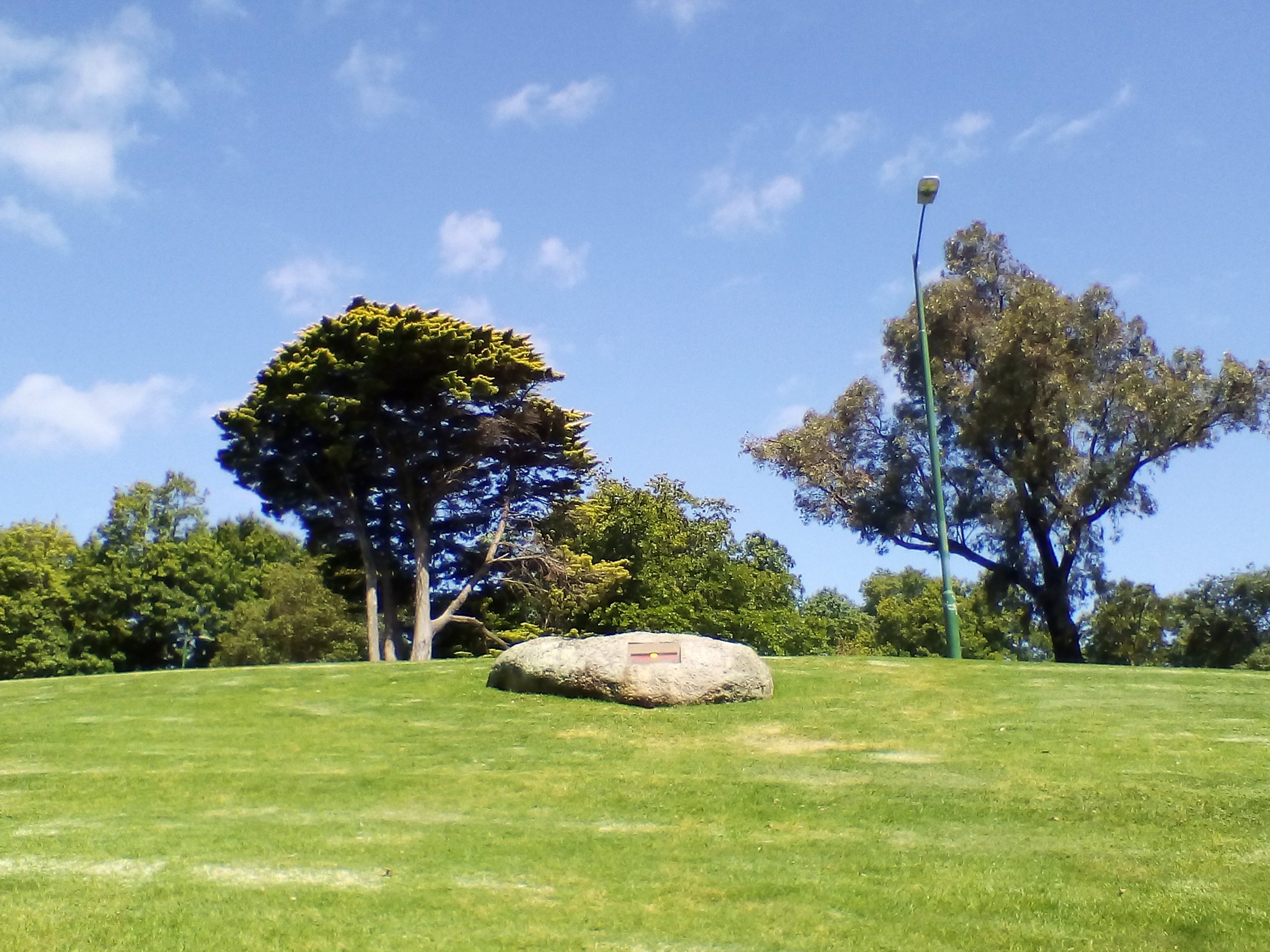
Kings Domain Resting Place – the location of the camp held significance.

Camp Sovereignty was born from the Australian-based ‘Black GST Movement’ which campaigns for ending genocide (G), acknowledging sovereignty (S), and making treaties (T) with Indigenous Australians. This movement originated in Melbourne in early 2005 by a group known as the Black GST political group.

The Black GST group were initially small and began publicising their message throughout 2005 in anticipation of the 2006 Commonwealth Games. The Camp Sovereignty protest was organised by the Black GST group and led by various well-known Indigenous activists including Marg Thorpe, Gary Foley and Robbie Thorpe, coordinating a predominantly young group of local Indigenous Australian activists.

The group campaigns for increased recognition of injustices. Their stance is as follows: that Genocide refers to the mass-slaughtering of Indigenous Australians in response to targeted massacres on Indigenous groups and the fact these have been overlooked in society. Sovereignty refers to a perceived regime of oppression with the Indigenous voice silenced under Commonwealth law rather than adhering to Traditional Law. Treaties refers to the lack of formal treaties with the Commonwealth and Indigenous Australians. Indigenous activists associate these three issues with ongoing land rights disputes.

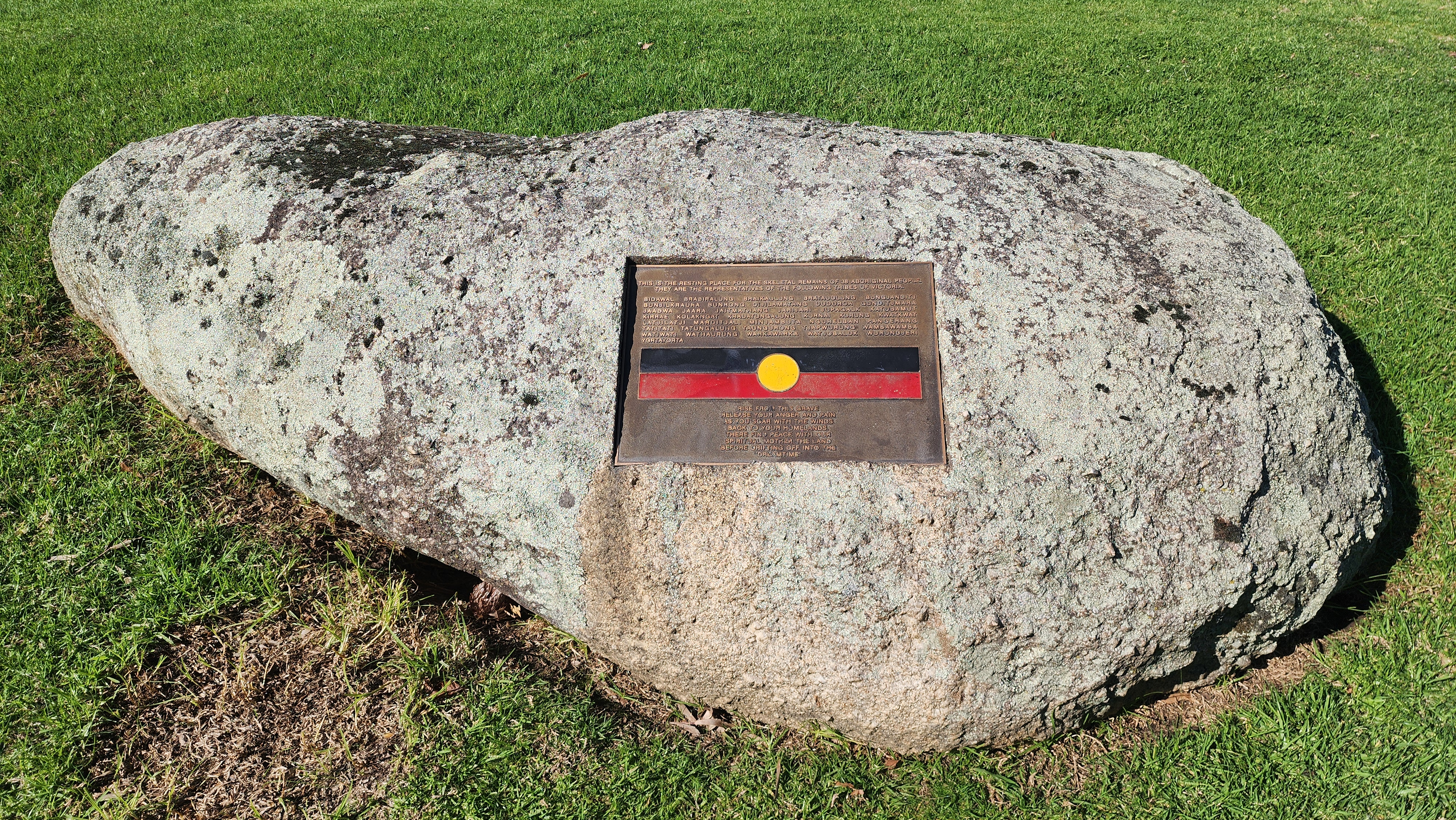
Resting Place from a close look

Aboriginal activist Robbie Thorpe has a weekly podcast where he shares his beliefs. In 2018, Thorpe dedicated an episode of this podcast to elaborate explicitly on the three components of Black GST. For example, one of Thorpe's arguments is their criticism of Australia as being the ‘single Commonwealth country which does not have an established treaty with their respective Indigenous peoples’. This podcast collates and shares interviews and primary accounts from the founding members of the Black GST group and later Indigenous activists of the 21st century.

The main site of the protest at Kings Domain holds particular significance. The Kings Domain Resting Place is a sacred burial site for repatriated deceased Victorian Aboriginal people. Campaigners argued ‘the sacred site has been destroyed and ruined by many different groups’. The area of Kings Domain is also a significant gathering site for Kulin peoples, and a former Aboriginal reserve.

== 2006 camp ==
Camp Sovereignty officially launched on 12 March 2006. Prior to Camp Sovereignty, the Black GST group began publicising their message and encouraging people to join their protest. Aside from the Indigenous Law Bulletin which encouraged Aboriginal activism in Australia, media outlets were not recognising the work and plans of the Black GST group. As the 2006 Commonwealth games were set to open on 15 March 2006, the group prepared the tents and crowds gathered for the event. With tents, a vocal group and various fires, it became clear this group would refuse to leave and the camp would remain. As this continued, the group were met with harsher criticism from the public and other Indigenous activities, along with legal threats from levels of government until it was inevitably shut down.

The Camp Sovereignty protest at the Commonwealth Games resembles similar protests where sports and politics intersect. Protests such as the Brisbane 1982 Commonwealth Games protest and Sydney's 1988 Bicentennial marches resemble the Camp Sovereignty protest and could be seen as inspiration for a successful protest at a major Australian sporting event.

=== Chronology ===
==== 2005: Formation of the Black GST group ====
The Black GST group is formed by a small group of activists in Melbourne early in 2005. The group consisted of various Indigenous and White activists with prominent figures including Robbie Thorpe, Marg Thorpe and Garry Foley. The group sought to publicise Indigenous civil rights issues and introduced their motives to end genocide, promote sovereignty and create treaties.

==== Early 2006: The 'Stolenwealth' Games ====
Prior to the 2006 Melbourne Commonwealth Games (15/3/2006-26/3/2006), the Black GST group encouraged people to attend their planned protest which would commence three days prior to the start of the Commonwealth Games. The group encouraged activists to join them in the camp protesting for the duration of the Commonwealth Games. The group branded the Commonwealth Games as the ‘Stolenwealth Games’ in reference to the Stolen Generations and what the GST were terming genocide. The group planned this initiative and invited activists throughout 2005 and early 2006 to best take advantage of the anticipated domestic and international media coverage. The group also pursued various events throughout the 2006 Commonwealth games including further protests and press events.

Uncle Kev Buzzacott was also involved in organising the protest, doing welcomes and attending to the fire.

Throughout February and early March 2006, the Black GST group and Victorian authorities engaged in frequent non-conclusive discussion to ensure "the protest is manageable" and is reasonable. These discussions combined with the government rejecting a cultural camp in Victoria Park, Collingwood had led the Black GST group to become increasingly vocal.

==== March 2006: The Commonwealth Games ====
On 2 March 2006, the group launched the Camp Sovereignty website to publicise their message online to a global audience and share the significance of their sacred site.

The 2006 Commonwealth Games ran from the 15th to 26 March. On 12 March, the Camp Sovereignty movement was launched and the Black GST political group established a camp in Kings Domain, Melbourne. The group lit a fire in the public park to represent their cultural traditions in the heart of the events as a form of Indigenous recognition at a Commonwealth event. The group publicised this idea of the "Stolenwealth Games", rebranding the motto of the games: “united by the moment” with “divided by history”. Throughout the games, the fire ceremony and protest continued and gained increased attention from the public, media outlets and authorities.

The choice of occupying Kings Domain was contentious because it was classified as a “Games Management Zone.” According to the Commonwealth Games Arrangements Act 2001 these zones are under special restrictions including strict bans on any form of protesting or demonstrating. The organisers selected this location to draw attention to the demonstration due to its historical importance and its proximity to the Queen's residence.

==== Late March – Early May 2006: Post-Commonwealth Games ====
Despite agreement to conclude the demonstration on 25 March, the group continued to occupy kings Domain beyond the Commonwealth Games events. After many disputes and legal issues the protest concluded on 10 May 2006.

=== Aftermath ===
After refusing to close the camp on 25 March by declaring the site of the fire in kings Domain as sacred, the state government initiated legal action to stop the demonstration.

As the camp continued beyond the Games, it continued to gain attention from levels of Governments. The Victorian government initially chose to delegate responsibility to the City of Melbourne, claiming they would not involve themselves in this contentious debate. Australian Prime Minister at the time, John Howard also commented on the state of Camp Sovereignty throughout April 2006 as the protest continued. Prime Minister John Howard criticised Victorian authorities for their inaction drawing similarities to the issues of the Aboriginal Tent Embassy in Canberra which has remained from 1972.

As the issues of Camp Sovereignty escalated, an Indigenous heritage inspector established a ‘thirty-day emergency protection order’ for the fire in Kings Domain, close to the Kings Domain Resting place. This meant the fire which had been identified as sacred could not be destroyed until 10 May 2006 to allow all parties to reach an optimal solution. The Black GST group were unable to extend the protection order past the original date of 10 May 2006, following a rejection from the authorities. This meant the fire in Kings Domain was inevitably extinguished and the camp was taken down. This enforcement led to the end of the official events of Camp Sovereignty which began as a temporary protest throughout the 2006 Commonwealth Games.

The work of the Black GST group continues throughout the 15 years after Camp Sovereignty, continuing to protest and build upon the events in 2006. Organisers and participants of the protests have frequently used Camp Sovereignty as a talking point to discuss their motives and work. This event had characterised the work of Indigenous Australian activists and specifically the Black GST group.

Robbie Thorpe's weekly podcast frequently refers back to Camp Sovereignty and how it has led to his future work as Australian Indigenous activists. These events have shaped the work of popular Indigenous activists such as Marg & Robbie Thorpe, Robert Corowa and Gary Foley making them well known to a wider audience and popular amongst Indigenous activist communities. While some within the community have criticised their work including several Elders, the events have been praised by many future activists and Indigenous leaders, referencing Camp Sovereignty as a point of inspiration for their work. Indigenous activist and politician Lidia Thorpe accredits the work of Robbie Thorpe including his contributions to Camp Sovereignty to her work in Indigenous representation claiming "Treaty would not be on the table today, if it wasn’t for my Uncle Rob".

The aftermath of Camp Sovereignty included future protests and sister fires to continue the message of Black GST. These events have had clear impacts on Indigenous Australian activism with similar protests at major sporting events drawing clear similarities. For example, the more recent Camp Freedom protest was a direct connection to the events of Camp Sovereignty, with a large protest at the 2018 Commonwealth Games on the Gold Coast. The protesters used the publicity of the 2018 Commonwealth Games to echo the concerns from Camp Sovereignty and continues to grow as a protest movement despite being shut down in 2006.

=== Media coverage ===
The focus of Camp Sovereignty was to maximise media coverage of Indigenous civil rights issues on a national and international scale to create reform.

The Black GST group made media coverage the focus of the protest. This shaped the plans of Camp Sovereignty using one of the most notable and publicised Australian sporting events in the Commonwealth Games as a mode of protest. This aim extended across domestic and international media outlets with the group believing ‘the world should watch and judge Australia for its treatment of its First Nations people. The events drew headlines across mainstream media outlets including The Age and The Wire which show Camp Sovereignty to be a notable protest. The group attracted frequent headlines specifically from The Age which tracked the growth of Camp Sovereignty. During 2006, the coverage was constant with comments from various governments and the current Prime Minister, it was major at the time when there was uncertainty about when and how the camp would end.

The ABC have a podcast titled Shooting the Past which analyses an image from the past and dissects its meaning and discusses the significance of the events with relevant stakeholders. in 2019, the ABC dedicated an episode of its podcast Shooting the Past to focus on an image from Camp Sovereignty. The image analysed was taken by photographer Lisa Belair, depicting a shirtless Indigenous Australian man and a white police officer holding hands in the camp setting. The hosts attempt to dissect the events behind the image whether it was a moment of tension or more likely a possible connection and friendship amidst the tense situation.

The ABC also invited Robbie Thorpe to comprehensively describe the events of Camp Sovereignty as a primary witness 13 years later. Additionally, the ABC collaborated with Australian academics Richard Broome and Kim Krugar to provide historical backing and context explaining Camp Sovereignty in the podcast. The podcast revisits the events of Camp Sovereignty and is evidence of continued media coverage and discussion of the Camp Sovereignty movement more than a decade later.

Through continued podcasts, articles and further media coverage 15 years on from establishment, the Camp Sovereignty movement has continued to be referenced and acknowledged. Its publicity and effects throughout the media are a testament to its credit as a protest movement by making media headlines and educating a wide audience nationally and internationally.

== 2024 camp ==
A second iteration of the Camp Sovereignty camp was established on 26 January 2024 in response to the Gaza War. The establishment of this camp was supported by Uncle Kev Buzzacott, Lidia Thorpe, and Uncle Robbie Thorpe, as well as dozens of activists and the Black Peoples Union.

The movement maintains its previous goals, while also calling on the return of the land it occupies for community use by Aboriginal and Torres Strait Islander people. It also occurs contemporaneously with the Yoorrook Justice Commission, a formal truth-telling process which Uncle Robbie Thorpe is formally contributing to in preparation for a Victorian state treaty with Aboriginal peoples. The camp has drawn supporters from migrant communities who support the movement in its protest against contemporary international genocide, including Australian involvement in the genocide in West Papua and the Gaza genocide.

The camp has seen support and visits from Members of the Victorian Parliament.

=== August 2025 attack ===
On 31 August 2025, a series of anti immigration rallies under the banner "March for Australia" were carried out throughout Australia, including Melbourne. Organisers of the rallies included individuals who have ties to neo-Nazi and White nationalist ideologies. A group of men broke away from the larger group after the Melbourne protest and stormed Camp Sovereignty. The attackers were armed with pipes and large tree branches, and appeared to be targeting women and older members of the site's encampment, as well as carrying out extensive damage to the sacred site. Among those caught on video carrying out the attack was neo-Nazi leader of the National Socialist Network, Thomas Sewell. The incident is being investigated by Victoria Police and the federal counter-terrorism unit, amid calls for it to be classed as a hate crime.

The following Saturday, on September 6, in response to the attack, Camp Sovereignty hosted Sovereign Day Out, bringing together numerous performers and musicians as well as First Nations cultural displays. The event was attended by several hundred people.
