= Jacob Hersant =

Australian neo-Nazi and convicted criminal

- Born: 1999 or 2000 (age 26–27)
- Organization(s): National Socialist Network (2020–2026); Antipodean Resistance (formerly)
- Children: 1
- Status: Guilty
- Criminal charge: Performing a Nazi salute in public

Details
- State: Victoria

Jacob Hersant (born 1999 or 2000) is an Australian neo-Nazi and was a leading figure in both the National Socialist Network (NSN) and the European Australian Movement (EAM). He was the first person convicted under Victorian laws banning Nazi gestures, including the public performance of the Nazi salute.

Hersant participated in violent offences, including a May 2021 attack on hikers at Cathedral Range alongside Thomas Sewell. The assault resulted in a 2023 conviction of both men for violent disorder. However, following a prosecution appeal against their sentences, they avoided further jail time. That same month, Hersant performed a Nazi salute in public and was charged. After unsuccessfully appealing his conviction, Hersant was sentenced on 4 February 2026 to one month's imprisonment and fined $1,000.

== Early life and education ==
Jacob Hersant was born in 1999 or 2000. He attended University High School in Melbourne. He reportedly wrote on the far-right Iron March forum "I was an edgy Atheist leftist gamer at 14, then I started playing a lot of Company of Heroes and that got me interested in World War 2. I always liked the Germans better since I have German heritage." He later wrote that after coming across the 2013 film Adolf Hitler: The Greatest Story Never Told on YouTube, "I've been a bad bad goy ever since."

== Activities ==
=== May 2021: Cathedral Range assault on hikers ===
On 14 May 2021, Hersant was charged after a raid by counter-terrorism police at a house in the Melbourne suburb of Rowville. Hersant and Thomas Sewell were charged after an attack on three hikers in Victoria's Cathedral Range. Up to 15 other masked men attacked two passengers in a car and smashed windows. After the windows were smashed, Hersant reached into the vehicle and attempted to remove its keys. A judge later described the incident as a "terrifying, intimidating and violent incident".

On 1 August 2023, Hersant and Sewell pleaded guilty to one charge of violent disorder. On 27 October 2023, Hersant and a co-offender were spared further jail time and sentenced to time already served. He was also sentenced to a 14-month community corrections order. Following sentencing, prosecutors appealed claiming that the sentencing was manifestly inadequate.

=== October 2023: Nazi salute ===
After avoiding further jail time for the Cathedral Range attack, Hersant performed a Nazi salute outside the court. After the act, he said "Australia for the white man. Heil Hitler, heil Hitler". Hersant became the first person charged under Victoria's new laws banning public Nazi gestures.

During the proceedings, lawyers for Hersant argued that the charge was not constitutionally valid as it violated the implied constitutional freedom of political communication. On 8 October 2024, during a hearing in Melbourne Magistrates' Court, he was found guilty of the offence. On 8 November 2024, Hersant was sentenced to one month in jail and then released on bail after appealing against the sentence.

Hersant's appeal was heard over three days in October. During the appeal, he argued that he had not performed a Nazi salute and, alternatively, that if he had, it constituted constitutionally protected political expression. At a hearing on 19 November 2025, County Court Judge Simon Moglia ruled that Hersant had deliberately performed a Nazi salute and that it was not protected expression. On 4 February 2026, Hersant was sentenced to one month in jail and fined $1,000 for breaching the community corrections order placed on him and Sewell following their involvement in the Cathedral Range attack.

=== July 2024: Train station protest ===
In July 2024, Hersant and 40 masked men entered a Melbourne train station, carrying a banner reading "Mass deportations now". Following the event, Hersant was arrested for "grossly offensive public conduct".

=== Halloween 2024 Ku Klux Klan stunt ===
On 7 November 2024, Hersant was arrested for allegedly taking part in a Halloween stunt in which he wore a Ku Klux Klan costume. During the incident, he allegedly racially abused members of the public. His co‑accused, Nathan Bull, allegedly wore blackface and a noose. On 3 February 2026, Hersant appeared in court and requested an adjournment, as he expected to be jailed the following day in relation to another matter. Bull did not attend the hearing, and a warrant was issued for his arrest. In March 2026, he faced court on a charge of "grossly offensive public conduct". The matter was adjourned to a later date.

=== April 2025: Anzac Day disruption ===
On 25 April 2025, Hersant was escorted by Victoria Police away from an Anzac Day dawn service in Melbourne following disruptions to a Welcome to Country. The shouting by the small group of far-right extremists was drowned out by applause from many in the crowd of about 50,000, and condemned by Prime Minister Anthony Albanese, Opposition Leader Peter Dutton and other political leaders, as well as RSL Victoria president Robert Webster, many war veterans, and Sunrise TV host Natalie Barr.

In September 2025, Hersant was charged with "behaving in an offensive manner while in a public place, offend against decency while in the Shrine of Remembrance reserve and taking part in a disturbance in the reserve". At a hearing in November 2025, Hersant indicated that he intended to plead not guilty to the charges. In June 2026, he was convicted and fined $1,900.

== Views and associations ==
Hersant was formerly associated with the Antipodean Resistance and the Lads Society, along with Thomas Sewell. He is known as a neo-Nazi and was a figurehead of both the NSN and the EAM. Both groups are now disbanded. These groups promote white supremacy and far-right activism in Australia.

In August 2021, in an undercover investigation by journalists, Hersant was recorded saying that Russian neo-Nazi Denis Kapustin "is a really good dude". Hersant was also recorded stating that he had put the Russian into contact with Jarrad Searby and that they were both into mixed martial arts.

After his conviction in 2024 for performing a Nazi salute in public, he stated to journalists "I'm ready to go to jail, because I'm a Hitler soldier and what I'm doing is right".

== Personal life ==
As of April 2025, Hersant lives in Kensington, Melbourne. He has a son.

== See also ==
- Far-right politics in Australia
- Far-right terrorism in Australia
