= Jarrad Searby =

Australian neo-Nazi and convicted criminal

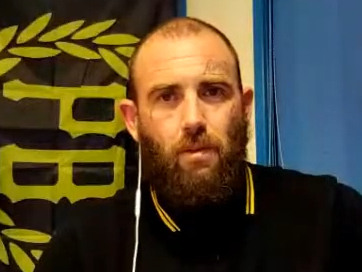
Searby in 2021

Jarrad Michael Leigh Searby (born 1986) is an Australian neo-Nazi and formerly the head of the now-defunct Australian chapter of the Proud Boys. He is known for his associations with others on the far-right, his opposition to the Victorian Government's response to the COVID-19 pandemic and his criminal conduct while a president of the Finks Motorcycle Club.

== Activities ==
=== COVID-19 pandemic ===
Searby was involved in protests against COVID-19 lockdowns in Melbourne. In October 2021, he called for "people trained in some form of combat" to arrest police at protests in posts he made on social media. In November 2021, Searby and other Proud Boys were pepper sprayed by police at a protest on Melbourne Cup day. After the protest, he made posts on social media, stating that he and other Proud Boys had intervened when police had attempted to detain protestors.

=== Far-right associations ===
Searby was formerly the head of the defunct "borderlands" chapter of the far-right Proud Boys in Australia. He had intended to use the Proud Boys as a gateway to recruit into the neo-Nazi National Socialist Network, but left after he became angry with their disavowal of Neo-Nazism. During an undercover journalist investigation conducted by The Age, 60 Minutes and The Sydney Morning Herald, Searby was recorded stating "You know they ban any, like, they ban Nazis from the [Proud Boys] club ... you know if you start to ask Jewish questions or something like that in the Proud Boys they will basically just try to kick you out". Searby had been in touch with the US-based leader of the Proud Boys, Enrique Tarrio, who praised Searby in an online video. Through Jacob Hersant, he was in contact with Denis Kapustin, who alongside Searby had an interest in Mixed martial arts.

=== Finks Motorcycle Club ===
Searby is a former president of the Wodonga chapter of the Finks Motorcycle Club. In May and June 2023, he and other Finks' members stood over and threatened two men in an attempt to get money and drugs out of them. On 1 June, Searby entered the men's home and stole $30,000 worth of equipment. Police later raided his home in relation to the robbery and found stolen property, weapons and drugs. In May 2024, Searby was convicted and jailed, for more than two years, for blackmail, burglary and drug charges. He had been jailed four times previously.
