= National Socialist Network =

Defunct Australian neo-Nazi group

- NSN flag
- Abbreviation: NSN
- Predecessor: Lads Society; Antipodean Resistance
- Formation: 2020; 6 years ago
- Defunct: 18 January 2026
- Type: Neo-Nazi extremist organisation
- Purpose: Neo-Nazism; Anti-immigration; Anti-LGBT; Antisemitism; Islamophobia; White supremacy; White nationalism; Sinophobia; Hinduphobia
- Headquarters: Melbourne, Victoria
- Locations: Adelaide, Brisbane, Melbourne, Sydney, Perth, Hobart
- Leaders: Thomas Sewell Jacob Hersant
- "Leader of White Australia NSW": Jack Eltis
- Affiliations: European Australian Movement; White Australia; Action Zealandia

The National Socialist Network (NSN) was an Australian neo-Nazi political organisation formed from two far-right organisations, the Lads Society and the Antipodean Resistance, in 2020. The organisation, based in Melbourne, was active in all six state capitals and several regional cities. The group used the protests against COVID-19 policies and other methods, such as media manipulation and attention-grabbing, to recruit new members. The organisation, was led by Thomas Sewell, neo-Nazi, convicted criminal and former Australian soldier.

In November 2025, members of the NSN held a demonstration outside the New South Wales Parliament in Sydney, displaying antisemitic banners and chanting neo-Nazi slogans. The demonstration was hosted under the name "White Australia". The group wanted to register itself as a political party in New South Wales under this name in September 2025, but this was disallowed by the Australian Securities and Investments Commission (ASIC). They adopted the name "Terra Australis Alba" instead.

In 2026, as a response to proposed hate speech laws in Australia, the organisation announced on Telegram that it would disband before 18 January, along with its "co-projects", the European Australian Movement (EAM), White Australia and the White Australia Party. In May 2026, the Australian government banned the NSN as a hate group under the new laws. The White Australia Party and Sewell challenged the ban in the High Court of Australia, which heard the matter in September.

== History ==
The National Socialist Network (NSN) was established in 2020 from two far-right organisations, the Lads Society and the Antipodean Resistance. It used the protests against COVID-19 policies during the COVID-19 pandemic in Australia to recruit members in 2021.

In September 2025, Jack Eltis, a part-time air-conditioning mechanic in Sydney, tried to register as a political entity called "White Australia Pty Ltd" in New South Wales, intending to use it to raise funds for a new political party. However, the name was rejected by ASIC, so he registered it as "Terra Australis Alba" on 11 September 2025. On 21 November 2025, the group claimed to have acquired the requisite 1500 signatures to register as a political party in Australia.

In late October 2025, Stripe, a multinational payment processor, disallowed use of their services through the NSN website, as it breached their terms of service. (Note: Specifically, the company "did not work with entities that "engage in, encourage, promote, or celebrate unlawful violence toward any group based on race".) After the group held an antisemitic rally outside the NSW Parliament in November 2025, a number of private financial companies and service providers cut off ties with the group. ME Bank, which is owned by the Bank of Queensland, froze Eltis's account, as he had contravened their terms. (Note: Specifically, "defame, harass or threaten any person... or promote violence against any person".) It was the third bank to refuse him service, and national leader Thomas Sewell had been expelled from nine banks.

== Description and location ==
The organisation was a far-right, neo-Nazi political organisation. It was based in Melbourne, and was active in all six state capitals and several regional cities. The Global Project Against Hate and Extremism released a report on 5 October 2022, in which it classified the National Socialist Network as a "white nationalist", "antisemitic", and "neo-Nazi" group.

NSN was led by Thomas Sewell, neo-Nazi, convicted criminal, and former Australian soldier. Membership figures were unknown. It used methods such as media manipulation and attention-grabbing stunts to recruit new members. The NSN had links to the European Australian Movement (EAM), a neo-Nazi group also founded by Sewell.

== Activities ==
=== 2020 ===
In 2020, a group of NSN members in Melbourne performed a Nazi salute and displayed a neo-Nazi flag at Swinburne University. A photo of the incident, shared on their Facebook page, included a caption stating: "NSN would like to thank the student body and faculty for letting us promote National Socialism on campus without opposition. Swinburne for the White man!". A university spokesperson responded: "Swinburne University of Technology abhors the comments, and the symbols depicted in the photograph taken on our campus. The views and ideas of groups such as this run counter to everything our university stands for, and we condemn them in the strongest possible terms".

=== 2021 ===
On the Australia Day weekend in January 2021, the National Socialist Network, a new group created by members of the Antipodean Resistance and the Lads Society under the latter's leader Thomas Sewell, were observed parading Nazi paraphernalia and harassing bystanders at several locations around the Grampians National Park in Victoria. One Halls Gap resident said: "There were 40 white males, many with skinheads, some chanting 'white power'". They were reported to have chanted "sieg heil" and "white power", burnt a cross, and posted stickers saying "Australia For The White Man".

Concerned citizens reported them to the police, who confronted the group and later collected video evidence from security videos. Victoria Police's Counter Terrorism Command and ASIO were notified, and the incident was widely covered in the media. One antisemitism expert called for the group to be branded a terrorist group, saying, "We know that there is a direct link between incitement, between vilification … and shooting rampages that we saw not just in Christchurch, but in other places".

=== 2022 ===
After a group of neo-Nazis had posted photographs of themselves giving fascist salutes outside the Adelaide Holocaust Museum, concerns were raised about the activities of groups such as the National Socialist Network in South Australia. On 2 September 2022, SA Minister for Multicultural Affairs Zoe Bettison said there would be a Parliamentary inquiry into "neo-Nazi symbols, the activities of extremist groups, discrimination faced by targeted groups and the prohibition on symbols in other states".

=== 2023 ===
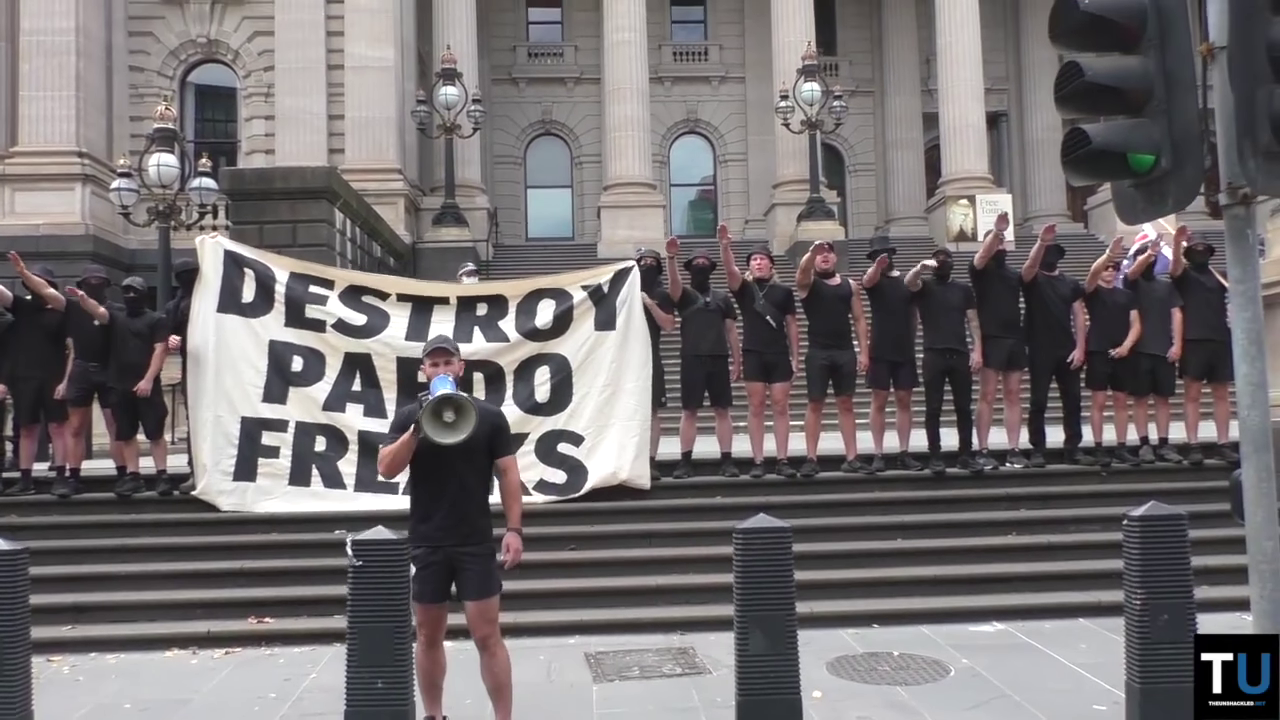
Members of the National Socialist Network doing Nazi salutes on 18 March 2023

In early January 2023, flyers belonging to the National Socialist Network were found in circulation in East Brisbane, Queensland. On 13 January 2023, a Melbourne Magistrates Court sentenced Sewell to 150 hours of community service to be completed in 18 months. On 26 January 2023, Australia Day, members of the NSN held a protest in Coburg, Victoria, where they displayed banners.

On 18 March 2023, approximately 30 members of the NSN, including Sewell, attended a rally in Melbourne in support of British anti-transgender activist Kellie-Jay Keen-Minshull, who spoke at the rally while visiting the city on her Australian and New Zealand tour. Members of the NSN marched down Spring Street, displayed a banner, performed Nazi salutes on the stairs of Parliament House, and referred to transgender people as paedophiles. A counterprotest attended by transgender rights protesters clashed with the group. While the police, including several mounted officers, attempted to separate the two groups, it was reported that pepper spray was used at least once. The events were condemned by the Labor Party and the Liberal Party.

On 13 May, neo-Nazi and anti-fascist groups clashed in Melbourne at an anti-immigration rally, organised by NSN. Police made several arrests on both sides, while also deploying capsicum spray. A police officer was also hit with pepper spray. Federal government minister Chris Bowen labelled the rally "unspeakably un-Australian", calling the neo-Nazis who participated a "fringe of political lunatics who have no place in modern Australia". The rally was also condemned across both sides of the Victorian Parliament, described as "toxic bigotry and hate" and "disgraceful and cowardly".

On 15 September 2023, a group of NSN members attempted to gatecrash an antifascist fundraiser at Cafe Gummo in Thornbury, Victoria. The event, hosted by Melbourne Skinheads Against Racial Prejudice, aimed to support the White Rose Society and the Black People's Union. In response, antifascist activists chased the NSN members several blocks, chanting "Nazi scum!" Witnesses reported that some of the masked NSN members were armed, although no arrests were made as individuals dispersed down side streets.

On 13 October 2023, after a candlelight vigil event for Israeli hostages in Gaza and ahead of pro-Palestinian protests in the city, the group gathered outside Flinders Street station in Melbourne, displaying an antisemitic banner at the station entrance under police surveillance; then the group members went inside the station, performing Nazi salutes while going down an escalator, and boarded a Werribee Line train. While on the train they asked passengers whether they are Jewish or not, handed out NSN's "business cards" and another racist flier; they also sang the Australian national anthem as well as a white racist anthem. After the incident, state officials including Premier Jacinta Allan condemned the action. The Victorian Government subsequently passed legislation banning public displays of the Nazi salute.

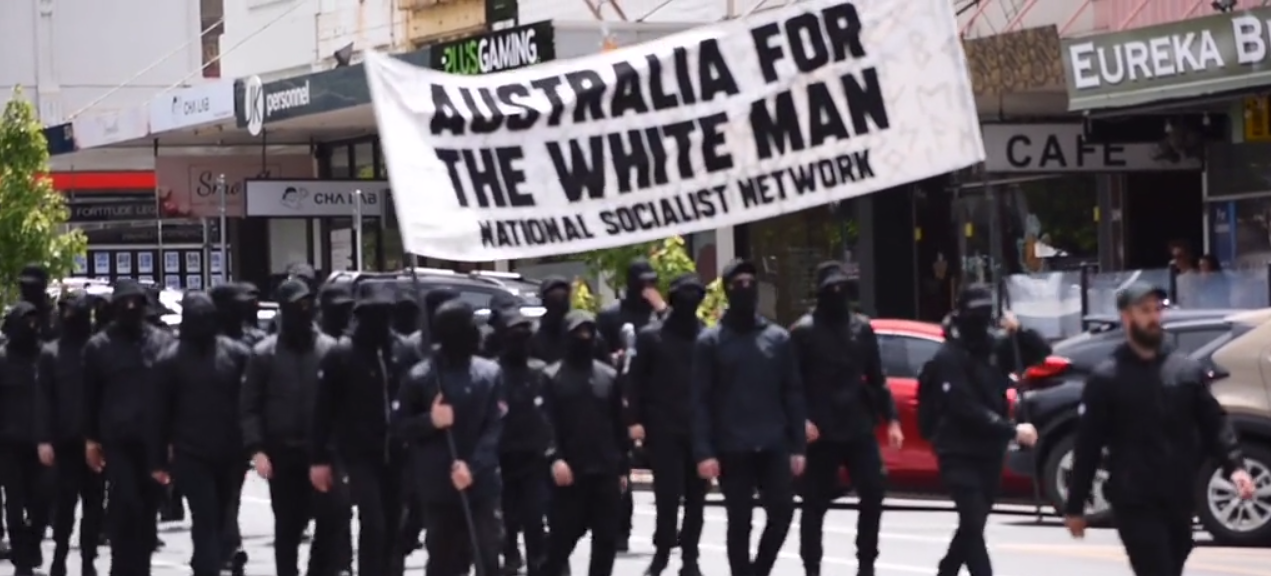
NSN members march through Ballarat

On 3 December, around 40 members of the NSN, led by Sewell, marched through the streets of Ballarat on the 169th anniversary of the Eureka Stockade. The group displayed a banner with the phrase, "Australia For The White Man" as they marched in through the city. A 15-year-old boy was questioned over his alleged use of the Nazi salute in support of the group.

=== 2024 ===
On 26 January 2024, a group of NSN members, led by Thomas Sewell, were detained by New South Wales Police Force at the North Sydney railway station. An officer issued Sewell and his group a legal order banning them from attending any Australia Day events in the City of Sydney, citing a risk to public safety and Sewell's history of crime and public order incidents.

Roughly 30 members of the Victorian chapter held a flash rally in late July 2024, marching from Melbourne’s Federation Square to Flinders Street station, clad in all black and carrying a large "Mass Deportations Now" banner. A participant in the rally was arrested for "grossly offensive public conduct". In the weeks following the 2024 United Kingdom riots, dozens of NSN members marched through the streets of Brisbane and posed in front of several landmarks whilst holding a banner which called for a "Free England".

In October, around 50 members of NSN marched through Corowa, NSW, protesting against the local piggery's takeover by multinational meat processor JBS and their employment of immigrant workers. They carried a "White Man Fight Back" banner. Later that month, approximately 40 members of NSN staged a protest outside the Chinese Consulate in Toorak, Melbourne, calling for the extradition of a Chinese national suspected of pouring hot coffee on a baby in a park. The protesters displayed a banner, burned portraits of the suspect, Mao Zedong, Xi Jinping, and the Chinese flag.

=== 2025 ===
On 11 January 2025, members of the NSN staged a protest on Adelaide's Morphett Street bridge, displaying a banner reading "Mass Deportations Now". Six participants were arrested and charged with wearing an article of disguise.

On 26 January 2025, around 40 members of the NSN, most of whom had travelled from other states, marched through Adelaide city centre, dressed in black and wearing sunglasses and hats. Chanting "Australia for the white man", the NSN group stood in front of the War Memorial on North Terrace. South Australia Police officers arrested 16 people, including a 16-year-old boy, on charges that included loitering and displaying Nazi symbols. Prime Minister Anthony Albanese condemned the action of the men, as did SA Premier Peter Malinauskas. Sewell and 13 other men appeared in court on 28 January, charged with a variety of offences, including carrying offensive weapons or articles of disguise, (Note: "carries an offensive weapon or an article of disguise" is a single offence in South Australia) and displaying Nazi symbols.

On 25 April 2025, prominent NSN member Jacob Hersant was escorted by Victoria Police away from an Anzac Day dawn service in Melbourne following disruptions to a Welcome to Country. The shouting by the small group of men was drowned out by applause by many in the 50,000-strong crowd, and condemned by Prime Minister Anthony Albanese, Opposition Leader Peter Dutton and other political leaders, as well as RSL Victoria president Robert Webster, many war veterans, and Sunrise TV host Natalie Barr.

On 1 June 2025, a group of NSN members staged a racist protest outside Northland Shopping Centre, Victoria, in the early hours of the morning. The protest came after a machete brawl which took place at the shopping centre one week prior. During the protest they held a banner with the words “Ban N-ers Not Machetes”.

On 4 August 2025, the NSN staged a protest on the Kwinana Freeway, in Perth. At about 12:40 am on 9 August 2025, around 100 members of the NSN, with their faces covered, marched through Melbourne's central business district. On 31 August 2025, a group of men from NSN identified as originally part of the March for Australia protests in Melbourne, broke away from the larger group and stormed the Aboriginal Camp Sovereignty. Among those caught on video carrying out the attack was Thomas Sewell. A number of NSN members, including Sewell, were subsequently charged for their parts in the attack. Sewell, Nathan Bull, Jake Crokett, Michael Saarinen, Jaeden Johnson, Blake Cathcart and Zack Dewaart subsequently pled guilty to charges of violent disorder. Bull also pled guilty to failing to provide his name and address to police. Cathcart also pled guilty to assault with a weapon. Timothy Lutze had also previously pled guilty, however subsequently died after his plea.

On 8 November 2025, approximately 60 individuals associated with the NSN gathered outside the New South Wales Parliament building in Sydney, wearing black clothing and displaying Nazi-style symbolism. The group carried a banner reading "Abolish the Jewish Lobby" and chanted Nazi phrases, including "blood and honour". The protest proceeded after the submission of a "Form 1" notice by Jack Eltis, "on behalf of White Australia, formerly the National Socialist Network", with police raising no objection under the state's Summary Offences Act. Senior police and the NSW Premier later stated they were not informed in advance of the gathering. The incident prompted widespread condemnation, and resulted in the Premier announcing a review of police procedures and consideration of expanded powers to prevent hate-driven assemblies. Following the protest Matthew Gruter, a South African national who had attended, had their visa cancelled and left Australia. Immigration Minister Tony Burke said, about the visa cancellation, "If you are on a visa you are a guest ... if a guest turns up to show hatred and wreck the household, they can be told it’s time to go home".

Also in November 2025, Jack Eltis, a man who described himself as "the leader of White Australia NSW" said that the NSN was "very close" to having the required number of members to register as a political party. On 20 November, prominent member Joel Davis was arrested by the Australian Federal Police in Sydney after allegedly sending a menacing message about independent NSW MP Allegra Spender in a Telegram group. Spender had criticised the rally on 8 November. Davis was later released in April 2026 on strict bail conditions.

== Disbandment ==
On 12 January 2026 the NSN announced it would disband in response to proposed new hate speech laws by the federal government. The new laws, which were proposed in response to the 2025 Bondi Beach shooting, would make it easier to designate organisations as prohibited hate groups. The statement, posted on Telegram, was signed by leader Thomas Sewell and other high-profile neo-Nazis. The announcement indicated that the "co-projects" White Australia, the European Australian Movement and the White Australia Party would also end. The Antisemitism, Hate and Extremism (Criminal and Migration Laws) Act 2026 passed on 20 January 2026. It passed in the House 116 votes to 7, and 38–22 in the Senate.

Some former NSN leaders have posted online statements such as "National Socialism is inevitable", and there have been indications that the neo-Nazis and white supremacist groups would be using an array of less well-known symbols and signs, not outlawed by legislation, to identify each other. These include ancient "Futhark" runes, the Sutton Hoo Helmet, the number 88, and the Norwegian textile brand Helly Hansen.

Former NSN member Brandan Koschel was arrested in Sydney on 26 January 2026 and charged with inciting hatred, after he delivered an alleged antisemitic speech at a March for Australia event, described by the police prosecutor as "brazen and public incitement of hatred towards the Jewish community". He was denied bail as the magistrate considered him a risk to community safety. Koschel later pled guilty to publicly inciting hatred and was sentenced to 12 months in prison.

On 15 May 2026, the NSN was banned by the government under the new laws against hate groups.

== Legal challenge ==
In May 2026, it was reported that former members of NSN had been fundraising to mount a legal challenge to the government's ban of the group. They had raised around A$157,000 of its stated goal of A$175,000, with several donations coming from outside Australia, including the UK and US. In May 2026, the High Court of Australia agreed to hear a constitutional challenge to the ban. The case was brought by the White Australia Party and Thomas Sewell.

On 4 June 2026, the court dismissed an application by White Australia for an injunction against the listing. The Full Court heard the case on 8 and 9 September 2026. The plaintiffs argued that the laws gave the government too wide a power to ban a group. The Commonwealth argued that the group was claiming to be a political party to protect violent rhetoric. A decision on the challenge may take months.

== See also ==
- Australian National Socialist Party (1962–1968)
- National Socialist Party of Australia (1964–1977)
- The Noticer, a far-right website.
