= European Australian Movement =

Australian neo-Nazi Group

- EAM flag
- Abbreviation: EAM
- Defunct: 18 January 2026; 9 months ago
- Type: Neo-Nazi extremist organization
- Purpose: Neo-Nazism; Anti-immigration; Ultranationalism; White supremacy
- Location: Melbourne, Australia
- Leader: Thomas Sewell
- Affiliations: National Socialist Network

The European Australian Movement (EAM) was an Australian neo-Nazi political organisation. The group was known for engaging in controversial public stunts. EAM was founded by Thomas Sewell, Australian neo-Nazi and leader of another group, National Socialist Network (NSN), that was linked with the EAM.

EAM claimed that they are creating a network of "White Australians across every city, suburb and town who are against the systematic replacement and destruction of White Australians". EAM actively promote themselves as being a men's health club and have been sighted boxing, lifting weights and exercising in public.

In 2026, as a response to proposed hate speech laws in Australia, the organisation announced on Telegram that it would disband before the 18th of January, along with its "co-projects", the National Socialist Network (NSN) and White Australia.

== Activities ==
In May 2021, Thomas Sewell and a group of 10-15 other masked men, who were members of the EAM and NSN, attacked hikers in Victoria's Cathedral Range. On 14 May 2021, Sewell was charged after a raid by counter-terrorism police at a house in the Melbourne suburb of Rowville. Sewell was charged with "armed robbery, robbery, theft, criminal damage, affray with face covering, affray, assault with a weapon, violent disorder, common law assault and committing an indictable offence whilst on bail". On 1 August 2023, Sewell pleaded guilty to one charge of violent disorder.

In May 2022, South Australia Police acknowledged that they were investigating EAM. The police statement came after EAM members distributed letters in Adelaide which included the phrase "blood and honour", a slogan which comes from the Nazi regime. Police stated that while it was "the right of individuals to have different beliefs in a democratic country", that they were concerned about groups "inciting people to commit violence".

In March 2024, members of EAM distributed letters in Wagga Wagga, a regional city in New South Wales. The letters claimed that those who joined EAM were fighting against the "systematic replacement and destruction of white Australians". After being contacted by constituents, politicians Michael McCormack and Joe McGirr expressed disgust, with McGirr referring the matter to police. McGirr stated that "images on the letter are reminiscent of Nazi symbols, the use of which is a criminal offence punishable by up to 12 months in jail and/or an $11,000 fine".

== Views ==
The European Australian Movement has a stated aim of building "a physical and politicised white Australian community" that seeks to preserve a white Australia. They believe Australia should remain a country inhabited by white Australians of European descent and have planned buying properties to set up communities of white Australians.

== See also ==
- National Socialist Order
- White Australia Policy
