= Kings Domain Resting Place =

Memorial in Melbourne, Australia

- Interactive map of Kings Domain Resting Place
- Location: Kings Domain on Linlithgow Ave, Melbourne
- Coordinates: 37.822633°S 144.972148°E

The Kings Domain Resting Place is a memorial in Melbourne, Victoria, Australia, located in Kings Domain on Linlithgow Avenue. The site is the resting place for the repatriated and reburied remains of 38 Aboriginal Victorians, marked by a memorial plaque embedded in a large granite boulder. It is an Aboriginal heritage site protected by the Melbourne Planning Scheme. The whole area of Melbourne's Domain Parkland and Memorial Precinct, including the site itself was added to the Australian National Heritage List on 11 February 2018.

== History ==
=== Repatriation and reburial ===
A campaign to have government laws enacted to return the remains of Aboriginal Australians held in collections from museums, universities and other places succeeded. Thereafter during 1985, legal proceedings undertaken by the Koorie Heritage Trust resulted in Melbourne Museum returning to Aboriginal Victorians the 38 individual skeletal remains it held in its anthropological collection. A lack of information on the identities and tribal affiliations of the deceased meant that the remains could not be returned to their ancestral lands. A number of Aboriginal Victorians led by Jim Berg, a Gunditjmara Elder, were involved in making an application to rebury the remains in Melbourne City gardens. They chose a place on the side of a grassy hill located in Linlithgow Avenue at Kings Domain.

Aboriginal people from all parts of Victoria were present at Melbourne Museum on the day of reburial. A smoking ceremony was performed and one by one, the remains of all individuals were encased in bark and cloth. From Melbourne Museum the remains were carried by 200 people who partook in the journey to Kings Domain. The remains were carefully re-interred and a wreath made from native Australian fauna was placed in the ground at the Resting Place and then all were buried. A granite boulder sourced from You Yangs Regional Park was placed on top of the burial location. A plaque embedded on the boulder states that the site is the resting place of 38 Aboriginal Victorians, it shows the Aboriginal flag and lists the Aboriginal tribes of the deceased. Among Aboriginal Victorians involved in the reburial, the event signified cultural ownership and control, and honouring ancestors through Aboriginal customs.

=== Significance of the site ===
Resting Place with wreath

As a site of commemoration for Aboriginal Victorians, the Resting Place has become an important Aboriginal place linked to ritual, ceremony, knowledge and cultural identity. For the non-Aboriginal population, it is a memorial.

Prior to colonisation, the King's Domain Parklands area had important wetlands and were an Aboriginal source of food and location for gatherings. The park location was chosen by Aboriginal Victorians for its prominence and possibility to inform the wider population regarding Aboriginal land ownership, and about historical crimes perpetrated against Aboriginal people during colonisation. The boulder with its rough granite contours, partially embedded in the land link it as a continuation of the surrounding terrain, in comparison with the European style monuments of Kings Domain that have a superimposed appearance on the landscape. As a contrast to the nearby Queen Victoria statue, the Resting Place is a location with added meanings for Aboriginal people. The site signifies land ownership and stands testament to the past, contemporary and future Aboriginal experiences within the country and symbolises ancestral restoration of the land taken by the Crown and named after her as Victoria. For Aboriginal people, the site has also marked their continuing campaign for the return of other Aboriginal remains and cultural artifacts.

During the Melbourne Commonwealth Games (2006), the Resting Place became a protest site for a group named Black GST (Genocide, Sovereignty, Treaty). Referring to the event as "Stolenwealth Games", the Black GST set up Camp Sovereignty and established a fire that later was put out by local authorities.

For many Aboriginal Australians, Australia Day (26 January) is known as Invasion Day, due to the colonisation of Australia. In 2019, an inaugural dawn service organised by Aboriginal Victorian politician Lidia Thorpe was held at the Resting Place as a day of mourning and reflection with Aboriginal and non-Aboriginal attendants. Aboriginal Australians who died in massacres and other forms of violence during the Frontier Wars are commemorated. The Victorian NAIDOC Committee hosts the annual dawn service on 26 January and the event is supported by Melbourne City Council.

== August 2025 attack on Camp Sovereignty ==
On 31 August 2025, anti-immigration rallies planned by individuals with known ties to neo-Nazi and White nationalists were carried out throughout Australia. A group of men identified as originally part of those protests in Melbourne, broke away from the larger group and stormed the occupied Aboriginal burial site and community healing space known as Camp Sovereignty that is located within the grounds of Kings Domain Resting Place. The group of attackers were reported as armed with pipes and large tree branches, and appeared to be targeting women and older members of the site's encampment, as well as carrying out extensive damage to the sacred site. Among those caught on video carrying out the attack was Thomas Sewell, a known Australian neo-Nazi leader.
