= Kings Domain =

Park in Melbourne, Victoria, Australia

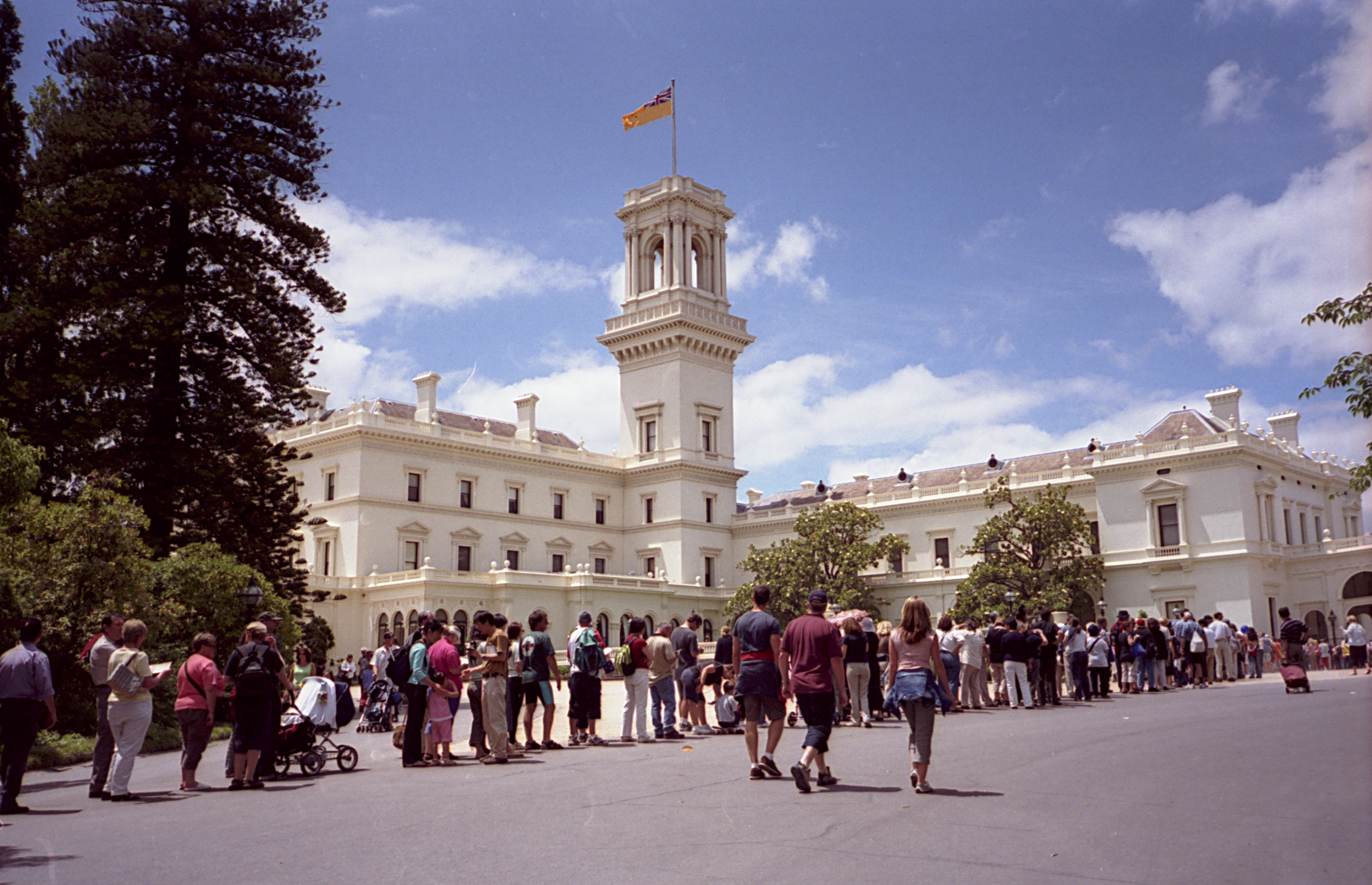
- Government House in the south-east corner of Kings Domain

- Location within Melbourne
- Interactive map of Kings Domain
- Type: Urban park
- Location: Melbourne, Victoria, Australia
- Coordinates: 37°49′33″S 144°58′27″E
- Area: 36 ha (89 acres)
- Opened: 1854; 172 years ago
- Status: Open
- Paths: Sealed
- Terrain: Undulating hills; riverbank
- Water: Yarra River
- Vegetation: Australian natives; lawns; European gardens
- Public transit: – Anzac, Flinders Street; – St Kilda Road trams; – bus routes; – from Federation Square
- Landmarks: Sidney Myer Music Bowl; Shrine of Remembrance; Government House; Indigenous Australians Remains Memorial; La Trobe's Cottage; Various statues and memorials
- Facilities: Seating; shelters; toilets
- Website: www.melbourne.vic.gov.au/kings-domain

Australian National Heritage List
- Official name: Melbourne's Domain Parkland and Memorial Precinct
- Type: Historic
- Criteria: A, B
- Designated: 11 February 2018
- Reference no.: 106305

Victorian Heritage Register
- Official name: Domain Parklands
- Type: Registered place
- Designated: 25 July 2013
- Reference no.: H2304
- Category: Parks, Gardens and Trees
- Heritage overlay no.: HO398

The Kings Domain is a 36-hectare (89-acre) urban parkland and an iconic part of the city centre of Melbourne, in Victoria, Australia. The Domain surrounds Government House Reserve, the home of the governors of Victoria, the Sidney Myer Music Bowl, and the Shrine of Remembrance. The Domain is important to the people of the Eastern Kulin nation and also has historical importance for its association with the early settlement of Melbourne and the foundation of British colonial administration in Victoria.

Established in 1854 and initially cleared of trees, the Kings Domain gradually grew and extended further north-west. The area comprises lawns and pathways set among non-native and native Australian mature trees, a mixture of deciduous and evergreens. In the 19th century the Kings Domain was managed by the director of the Botanic Gardens, so many of the trees were planted by Baron Ferdinand von Mueller and later by William Guilfoyle.

There are many memorial statues and sculptures spread throughout the Kings Domain.

Kings Domain is part of a 123-hectare (300-acre) larger area of parklands directly south-east of the city, bounded by the Yarra River, Anderson Street, Domain Road and St Kilda Road, collectively known as the Domain Parklands. In addition to the Kings Domain and Kings Doman South, these parklands also include Alexandra Gardens, Alexandra Park, Queen Victoria Gardens, the Sidney Myer Music Bowl, Melbourne Gardens (Royal Botanic Gardens), Melbourne Observatory, the Shrine of Remembrance Reserve and Government House Reserve.

The park is located on the traditional lands of the Wurundjeri Woi-wurung people; and is administered by the City of Melbourne.

== Heritage listings ==
The Domain Parkland and Memorial Precinct (Note: The area on the Australian National Heritage List included St Kilda Road and the Melbourne Observatory. However, it excluded the Royal Botanic Gardens.) was added to the Australian National Heritage List on 12 February 2018 by the Australian Government in recognition of the Domain's association with Australia's national heritage – in particular, as a place where the Traditional Owners asserted control to ensure the return and (re)burial of their ancestors is in accordance with their cultural protocols. The precinct also demonstrates a rare government domain with strong Victorian era components of significant to the Australian people.

Additionally, the entire Domain Parklands were added to the Victorian Heritage Register on 25 July 2013 by the Government of Victoria in recognition of its historical, archaeological, aesthetic, architectural, scientific (horticultural), and social significance to the State of Victoria.

Some notable elements within the Domain were also listed on various heritage registers, including the:

- Government House Complex – added to the Victorian Heritage Register on 20 August 1982 and to the now defunct Register of the National Estate on 21 March 1978
- Melbourne Observatory – added to the Victorian Heritage Register on 20 August 1982 and to the now defunct Register of the National Estate on 21 March 1978
- Shrine of Remembrance – added to the Victorian Heritage Register on 14 December 1991; and to the now defunct Register of the National Estate on 27 October 1998 (Note: The Shrine is listed as added to the Australian National Heritage List on an unknown date; However, the legal status states: "Nomination now ineligible for PPAL," where "PPAL" refers to the priority assessment list.)
- La Trobe's Cottage – added to the Victorian Heritage Register on 13 April 1995 and to the now defunct Register of the National Estate on 21 March 1978
- Sidney Myer Music Bowl – added to the Australian National Heritage List on 21 September 2005; to the Victoria Heritage Register on 18 February 1999; and to the now defunct Register of the National Estate on an unknown date
- Boer War Monument – added to the Victorian Heritage Register on 14 June 2007
- Lord Hopetoun Memorial – added to the Victorian Heritage Register on 10 May 2007

== Notable structures ==
=== Sidney Myer Music Bowl ===
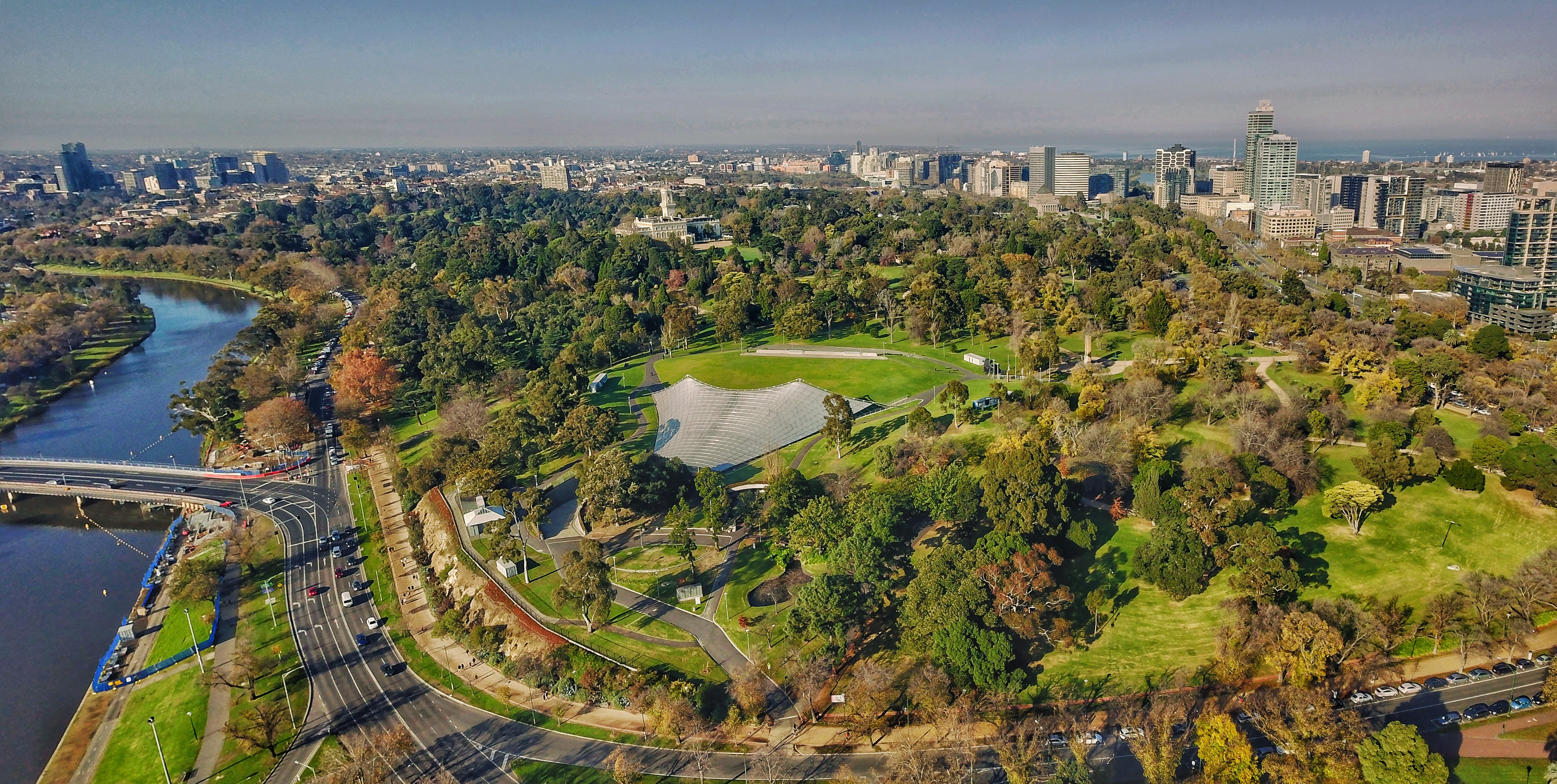
Aerial perspective of the Sidney Myer Music Bowl

The heritage-listed Sidney Myer Music Bowl is a world standard, architecturally significant, tensile structure and outdoor performance venue. It was officially opened by Prime Minister Robert Menzies on 12 February 1959 with an audience of some 30,000 people, and has remained a popular location for Melburnians.

=== Shrine of Remembrance ===
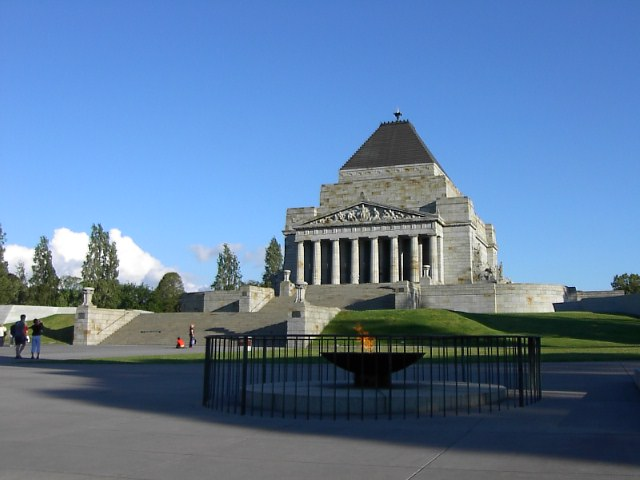
Shrine of Remembrance

The heritage-listed Shrine of Remembrance is one of the largest war memorials in Australia. It was built as a memorial to the men and women of Victoria who died in World War I, but soon came to be seen as Australia's major memorial to all the 60,000 Australians who served in that war.

=== La Trobe's Cottage ===
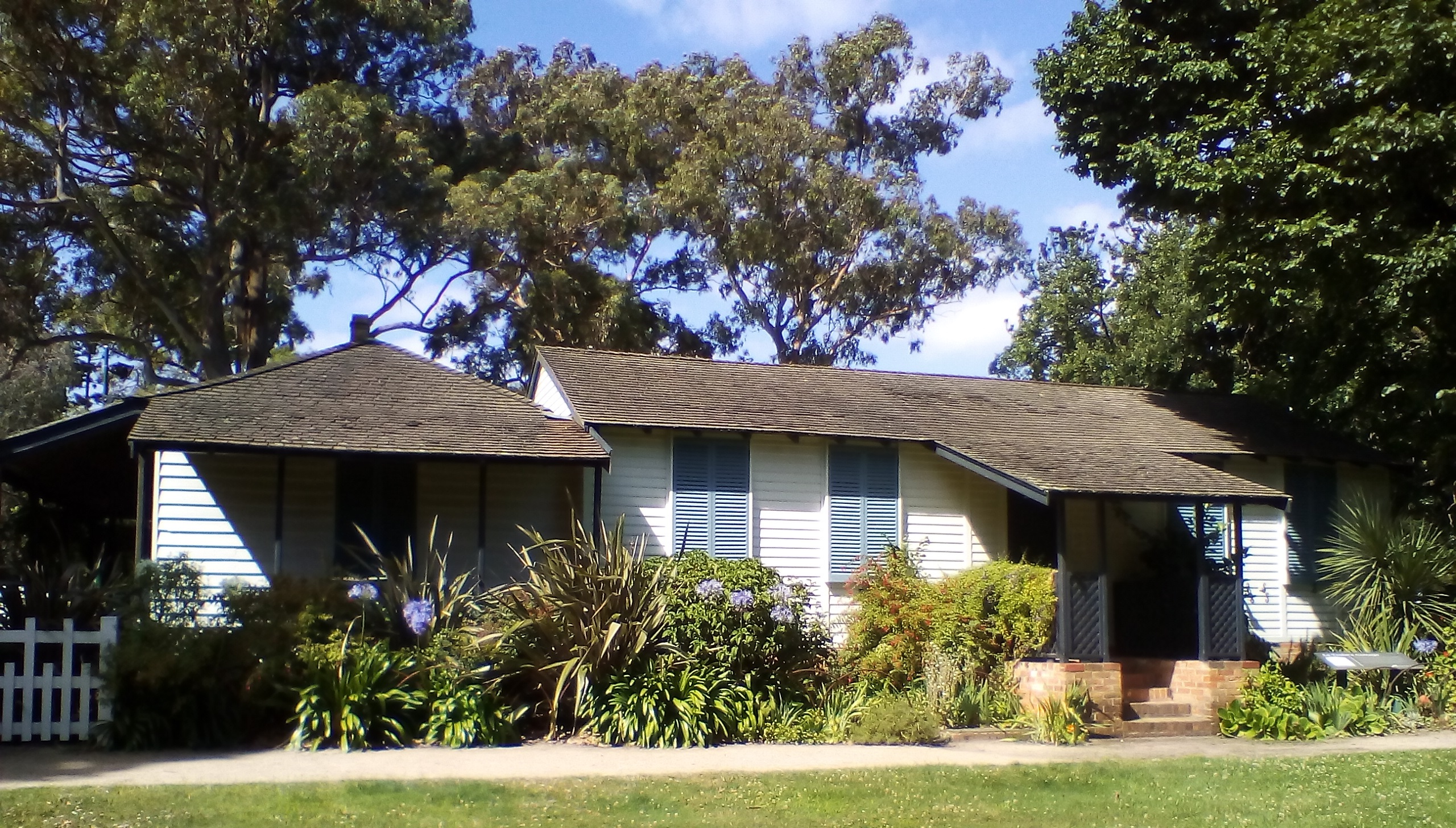
La Trobe's Cottage

The heritage-listed Governor La Trobe's Cottage is an historic cottage built in 1839 for the first superintendent of the Port Phillip District of the Colony of New South Wales, Charles La Trobe, and his family. The cottage was constructed out of prefabricated materials imported from England on five hectares (twelve acres) at Jolimont. It is one of the few surviving examples still standing of prefabricated houses from this period of history and gives an insight into early colonial domestic architecture and living arrangements. In 1963 the cottage was relocated to the Kings Domain as an historical landmark, and is now located backing on to Dallas Brooks Drive.

=== Government House ===
The heritage-listed Government House is the office and official residence of the governor of Victoria since 1934. Between 1901 and 1930 it was used as the official residence of the Governor-General of Australia. Built between 1871 and 1876 in the Victorian Italianate style, it reflects the extravagant style of the period arising from a booming economy due to the Victorian gold rushes.

=== Kings Domain Resting Place ===
Kings Domain Resting Place

The Kings Domain Resting Place is a memorial for the remains of Indigenous People marked by a granite burial rock honouring the Aboriginal People of Victoria, including the local Wurundjeri people. The skeletal remains of 38 Aboriginal People are buried here, after they were handed over to the Aboriginal Community in 1985 by the Melbourne Museum after the Koorie Heritage Trust proposed legal action.

=== Statues and other memorials ===
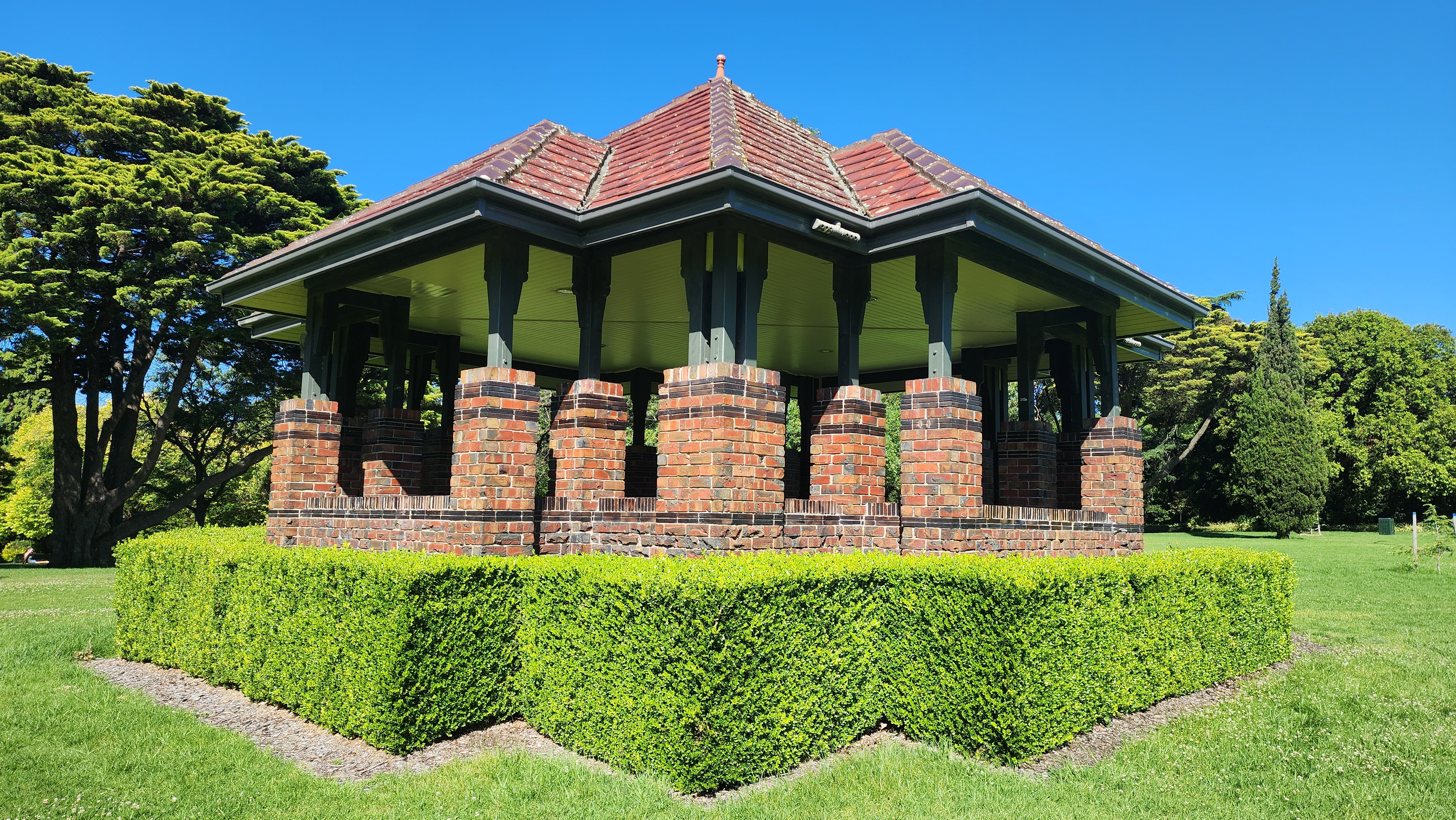
Stapley Pavillion

Over many years, the Kings Domain has been a popular location to erect status and memorials, to the point where, according to some, it has become clogged. The description on the Australian National Heritage List was more subtle:

Over a long period the place has been recognised as a home for memorials to important events and people. In this way the park is a significant holder of the city's memory. The many memorials located within the place indicate the high esteem held for the area by the community.

However, in its 2019–2039 Master Plan, the City of Melbourne announced that it would not permit any additional large memorials or monuments, and stated:

There are many memorials within the Kings Domain. Due to its location, character and high profile, the Kings Domain is frequently requested as the location to place new memorials. While each existing memorial has merit, the ad hoc accumulation over time has resulted in visual clutter and limitations on the way the parklands can be used… It is proposed that no further large memorials be placed in the Kings Domain, and any future memorialisation only be considered where it could become part of the landscape rather than as a specific element.

==== List of statues and other memorials ====
The following statues or memorials have been erected in the Kings Domain and the adjacent heritage area:

Date completed	Honouree or name of work	Image	Type of memorial	Description	Notes
29 May 1904	Boer War Monument		Monument made of sandstone with a bluestone base by George De Lacy Evans	Honours Australians who died in the Second Boer War, funded by members of the 5th Victorian Mounted Rifles Regiment	
30 January 1908	Edmund FitzGibbon Memorial		Granite statue by James White	Erected in honour of Fitzgibbon, the first town clerk of Melbourne, located on St Kilda Road	
15 June 1911	Lord Hopetoun (Note: Also known as the "Marquess of Linlithgow Memorial.")		Bronze equestrian statue	Facing St Kilda Road near the entry to Government House Drive, a result of a public subscription, unveiled by Sir John Fuller, accompanied by Billy Hughes	
21 July 1920	King Edward VII		Bronze statue by Sir Bertram Mackennal RA		
1925	Water Nymph		Statue		
1928	Apollo and Hercules		Statue		
10 May 1926	War Horses Memorial		Granite horse trough	Erected by the Purple Cross Society in honour of the horses lost in World War I and funded by the Boer War Light Horsemen. Unveiled by Sir John Monash	
12 November 1926	Edith Cavell		Marble bust sculpted by Margaret Baskerville	Cavell was an English nurse who helped English and French prisoners escape from Belgium during World War I, and was tried by the Germans and executed on 12 October 1915. Funded by public subscription, relocated 1961	
24 November 1934	Pioneer Women's Memorial Garden		Sunken garden area, with a blue-tiled grotto, which contains a small bronze figure of a woman, designed by Hugh Linaker	Dedicated in tribute to the European pioneer women of the colony, during the centenary year of the founding of Melbourne. Various plaques have been installed in the Garden in honour of pioneer Australian women.	
1946	Peace Garden		Stone arbours		
12 November 1950	Sir John Monash		Bronze equestrian statue by William Leslie Bowles	Dedicated as Commander in Chief of the Australian Forces during World War I, unveiled by the Governor-General, William McKell	
20 July 1952	King George V		Bronze, granite and sandstone sculpture by William Leslie Bowles	A public meeting on 6 February 1937 decided to erect a memorial for the late King and launched a public appeal. Construction was delayed by World War II	
1953	Melbourne Rotarians		Seat		
February 1960	Sir Thomas Blamey		Granite and bronze statue by Raymond B. Ewers	Stands on the corner of Government House Drive and Birdwood Avenue and honours Australia's first Field Marshal and his insistence to the British command that Australian forces remain as cohesive units under Australian command.	
1964	Miraggio (also known as Seated Figure)		Bronze sculpture by Pino Conte	Donated by an anonymous ‘lover of Italy’. Following the re-landscaping, Miraggio was reinstalled in October 2001. To be faithful to the donor's wishes and the apparent intent behind the work, the figure is installed as if she were part of the audience.	
7 May 1965	Edward George Honey		Bronze and aluminium plaque on a large stone, unknown maker	Located on Birdwood Avenue. Honey was a Melbourne-born journalist who campaigned for, and was one of those instrumental in, the adoption of the Two-minute silence on Armistice Day to pause and reflect on those who have lost their lives in war.	
1966	Floral Clock				
1970s	Genie, Pathfinder and Phoenix		Statues		
18 December 1981	The Walker Fountain		Concrete fountain designed by Mobelt, Digregorio & Associates	Donated by Ron Walker, Lord Mayor of Melbourne, and his wife Barbara as a gift to the people of Victoria. It is located on Linlithgow Avenue and consists of a small lake with hundreds of streams of water, including underwater lights. It replaced the Edmund Fitzgibbon Memorial on the same site.	
11 December 1994	Shelter of Peace		Timber sculpture by Max Chester	Honours the people of Malta, awarded the George Cross, for their role in defence of the country during World War II. Erected by the Maltese community of Melbourne	
15 August 1995	Sir Edward "Weary" Dunlop		Statue made from bronze, granite and metal spikes from the Burma-Thailand Railway by Peter Corlett	Dunlop was known as a courageous leader and compassionate doctor and showed great leadership while serving as prisoner of war in Changi Prison and on the Burma-Thailand Railway during World War II. On the steps leading to the sculpture are the names of other doctors who were also POWs at Changi.	
1999	Tilly Aston		Sculpture of three bronze bells by Anton Hasell	Aston was a blind disability activist who founded the Victorian Association of Braille Writers, and later went on to establish the Association for the Advancement of the Blind. On the sculpture there is an embedded image of Aston with text in embossed lettering and in braille	
2 November 2001	Australian and Hellenic men and women		Sculpture of 12 columns of granite, cast bronze, and white marble by Evangelos Sakaris	Commissioned by the Greek community of Melbourne, it honours those who served in Greece and in the battle of Crete during World War II	
2002	Victoria Police		Bluestone, Riverina granite, coloured stone, bronze sculpture by Anton Hasell and Marcus Ward	Stands as an ongoing dedication and reminder of the service provided by those killed in the line of duty	
13 April 2015	Australian Turkish Friendship Memorial		Stainless steel, granite, bluestone, copper sculpture by Matthew Harding	Commissioned by the Victorian RSL's Turkish Sub-branch honours WWI fallen soldiers and is a tribute to Australian-Turkish relations	

== Fauna ==
Many native animals live in and visit King's Domain including the Brush-tailed and Ring-tailed possums, Tawny Frogmouths, Magpies, Gould's wattled bats, Eastern Freetailed bats and Grey headed flying foxes, Native water rats (Rakali), Kookaburras and several varieties of waterbirds.

== See also ==
- Parks and gardens of Melbourne
- Heritage gardens in Australia
- List of heritage-listed buildings in Melbourne
- List of public art in Melbourne
