= Blut und Ehre =

Nazi political slogan

Blut und Ehre (English: "Blood and Honor") was a slogan used by the Hitler Youth, among others.

== Use under Hitler ==
The terms "Blood and Honor" were constitutive concepts of the "Nordic-German Racial Spirit" to Alfred Rosenberg, who developed them in his work The Myth of the 20th Century, published in 1930. Through Rosenberg's Myth, these terms entered the development of the Hitler Youth. Four of the collected essays of Rosenberg published between 1936 and 1941 dealt with this concept.

The slogan was widely identified with the Hitler Youth. It was the title of a songbook, was embossed in the belt buckle of the Hitler Youth uniform and between 1933 and 1938 was engraved on the blade of the Hitler Youth's hiking knife.

== Use today ==
In Germany, the use of this slogan in German is legally considered to be a use of a symbol of an unconstitutional organization, and is subject to legal penalty. According to a judgement of the Federal Court of Justice in 2009, the use of the English translation "Blood and Honour" is not subject to legal penalty.

The motto has been used in translation by several different neo-Nazi organisations. Blood and Honour is an international network of neo-Nazi musical groups. The motto has also been used, in modified form, by followers of Golden Dawn party in Greece.
