= Robbie Thorpe =

Aboriginal Australian activist

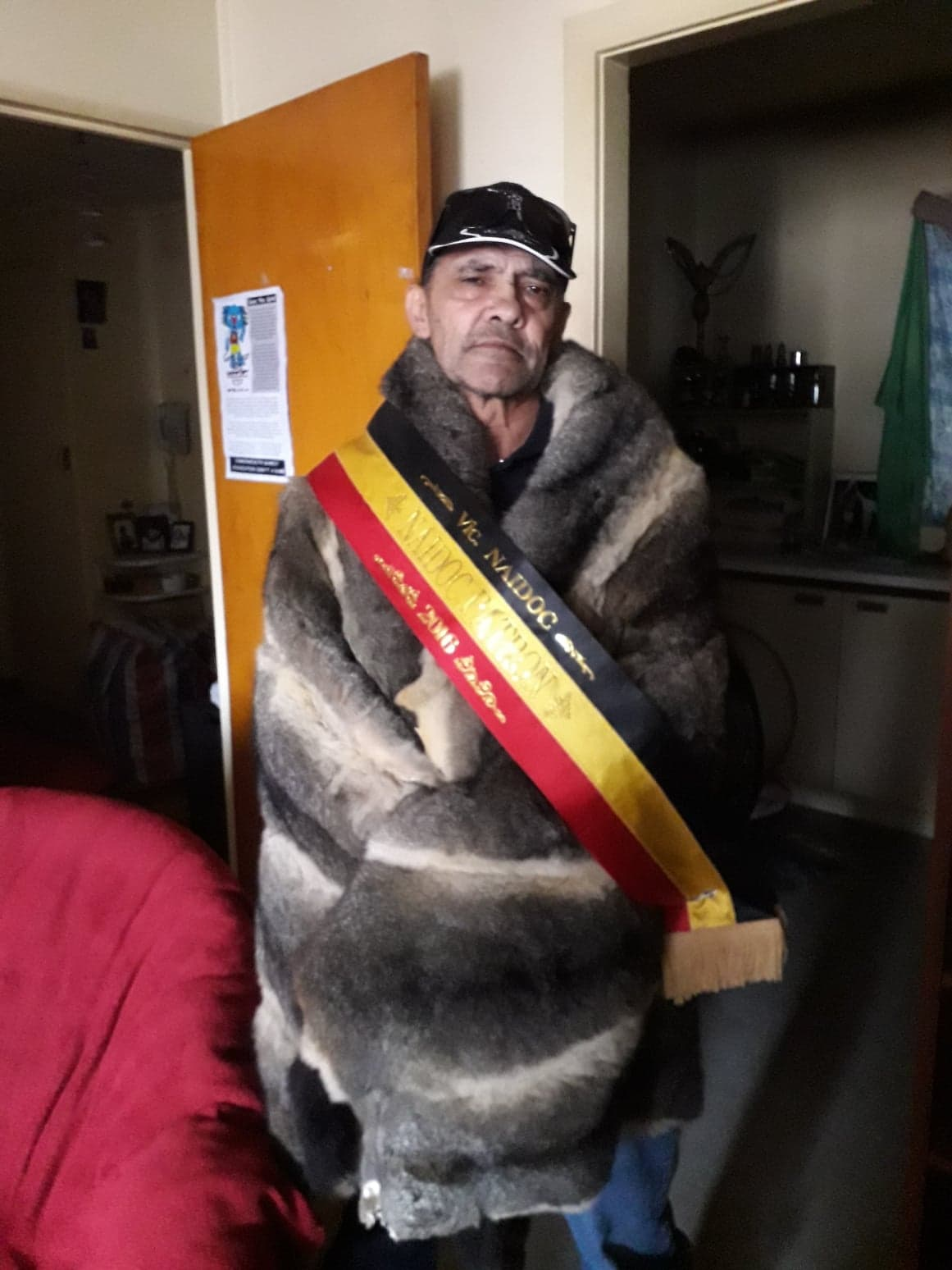
Photo of Robbie Thorpe

Robert Alan Thorpe is an Aboriginal Australian activist and presenter of Fire First, a program on community radio station 3CR in Melbourne.

== Early life and family ==
Thorpe is from the Krautungalung people of the Gunnai Nation traditional custodians of the Gippsland region, and is the uncle of Senator Lidia Thorpe.

== Activism ==
Thorpe has campaigned for Indigenous solutions in Australia since the 1970s. He is an advocate for Pay The Rent, an Indigenous initiative set up to provide an independent economic resource for Aboriginal peoples, and the Aboriginal Passport initiative.

Inspired by Bruce McGuinness' newspaper The Koorier (1968–1971), Thorpe founded and ran the publication The Koorier 2 during the 1970s and 1980s, and later The Koorier 3, published by the Koori Information Centre.

In 1982, Thorpe challenged the Commonwealth of Australia in a case entitled Thorpe V Commonwealth for not protecting people from crimes connected to genocide. Since 2020, Robbie has been working on a court case to charge the Crown for crimes against humanity.

Amid allegations that Israel was committing genocide in Gaza, Thorpe brought a private prosecution against Australian-Israeli diplomat Mark Regev in 2024. Thorpe accused Regev of "advocating genocide", a crime included in section 80.2D of the Australian Criminal Code. Regev was served in Israel with a Hebrew copy of the charge sheet. The charge was based on remarks Regev made during a radio interview on 10 October 2023, in which he advocated for Israel to cut off the supply of essentials such as food, water and electricity to Gaza. Lawyers for the Israeli government contacted the Commonwealth Director of Public Prosecutions and formally requested the dismissal of the case. On 10 December, the DPP's office formally took over the case and withdrew the charges against Regev, a decision which Thorpe said he would appeal.

== Radio and film ==
Robbie initiated the 3CR's Fire First program with Clare Land, after appearing on her Tuesday Breakfast program with his comrade Fantom. Between 2005 and 2006, Fire First supported and fed into the Black GST (Genocide, Sovereignty, Treaty) Collective,. a campaign to end genocide, recognise Australian Aboriginal Sovereignty and make Treaty, that protested at the 2006 Commonwealth Games. In 2006, Fire First presented several live broadcasts and a daily update from Camp Sovereignty.

Thorpe has produced numerous videos to support campaigns and campaigners, including advice videos for pro-Indigenous white activists in Australia with fellow activist Gary Foley. These videos are aimed at non-Indigenous people seeking to act in solidarity with Aboriginal and Torres Strait Islander peoples.

Thorpe's speeches and interviews are frequently captured on news and for activist films and he has starred in hip hop videos and other creative productions.

As of August 2022, Thorpe's own story is being captured in a new documentary film, directed and produced by Anthony Kelly, entitled Our Warrior: The Story of Robbie Thorpe.
