= 2024 in Australia =

- Monarch: Charles III
- Governor-General: David Hurley, then Sam Mostyn
- Prime minister: Anthony Albanese
- Population: 27,122,411 people at 31 March 2024.
- Australian of the Year: Georgina Long and Richard Scolyer
- Elections: Tasmania, Northern Territory, Australian Capital Territory, Queensland

The following is a list of events that occurred in the year 2024 in Australia.

- Decades: 2000s; 2010s; 2020s; 2030s
- See also: 2024 in Australian television; 2024 in Australian sport; 2024 in Australian literature; Other events of 2024; Timeline of Australian history

== Incumbents ==
Monarch

Charles III

Governor-General

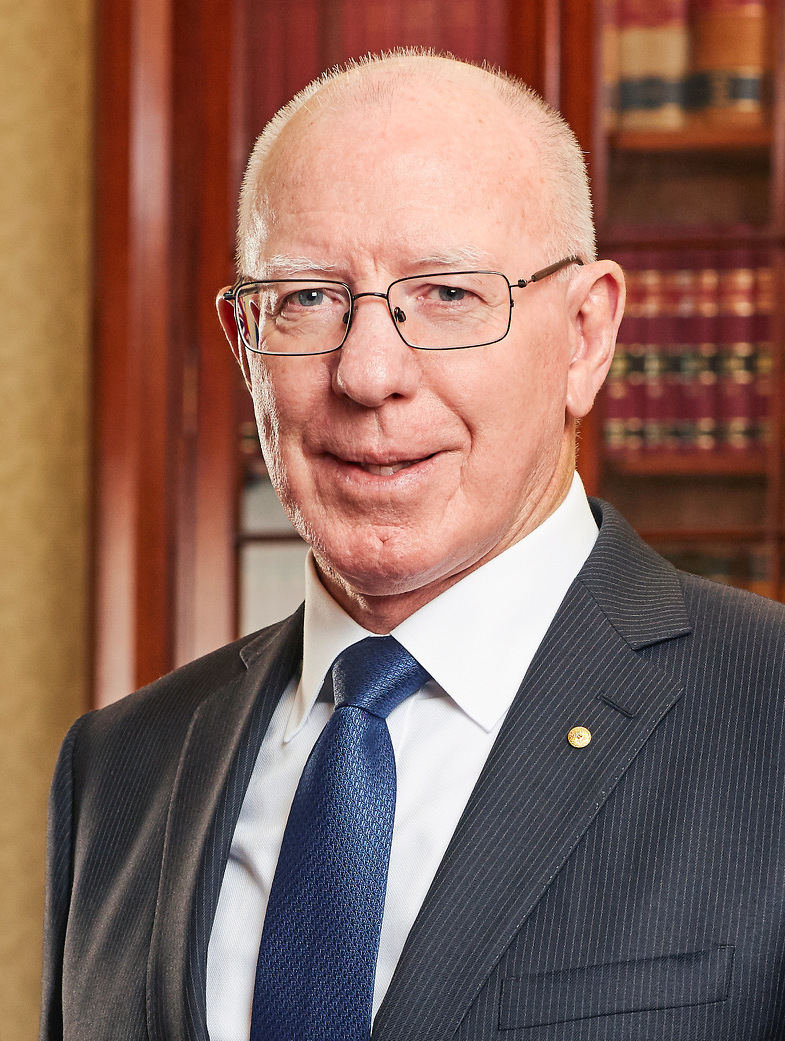
David Hurley

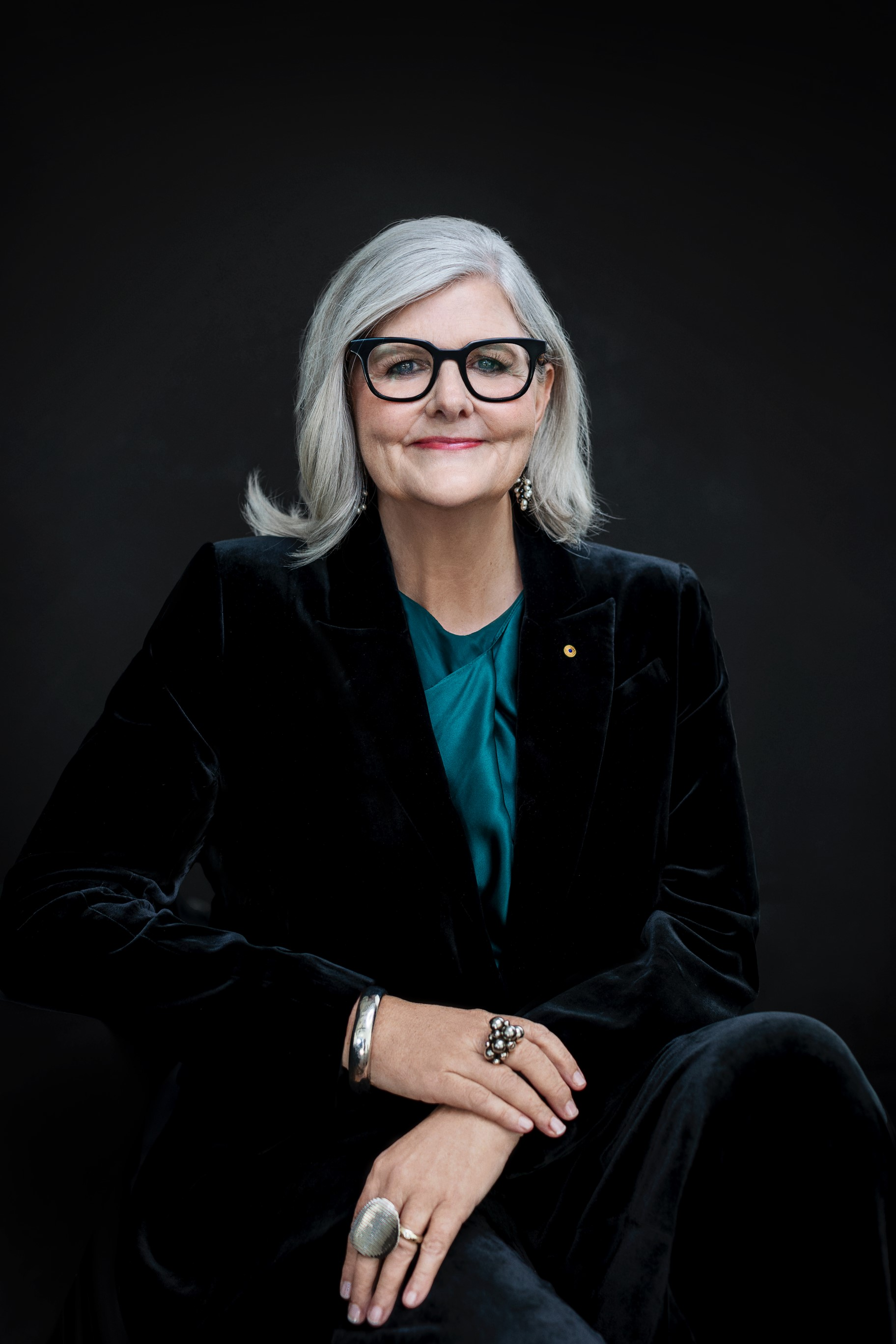
Sam Mostyn

Prime Minister

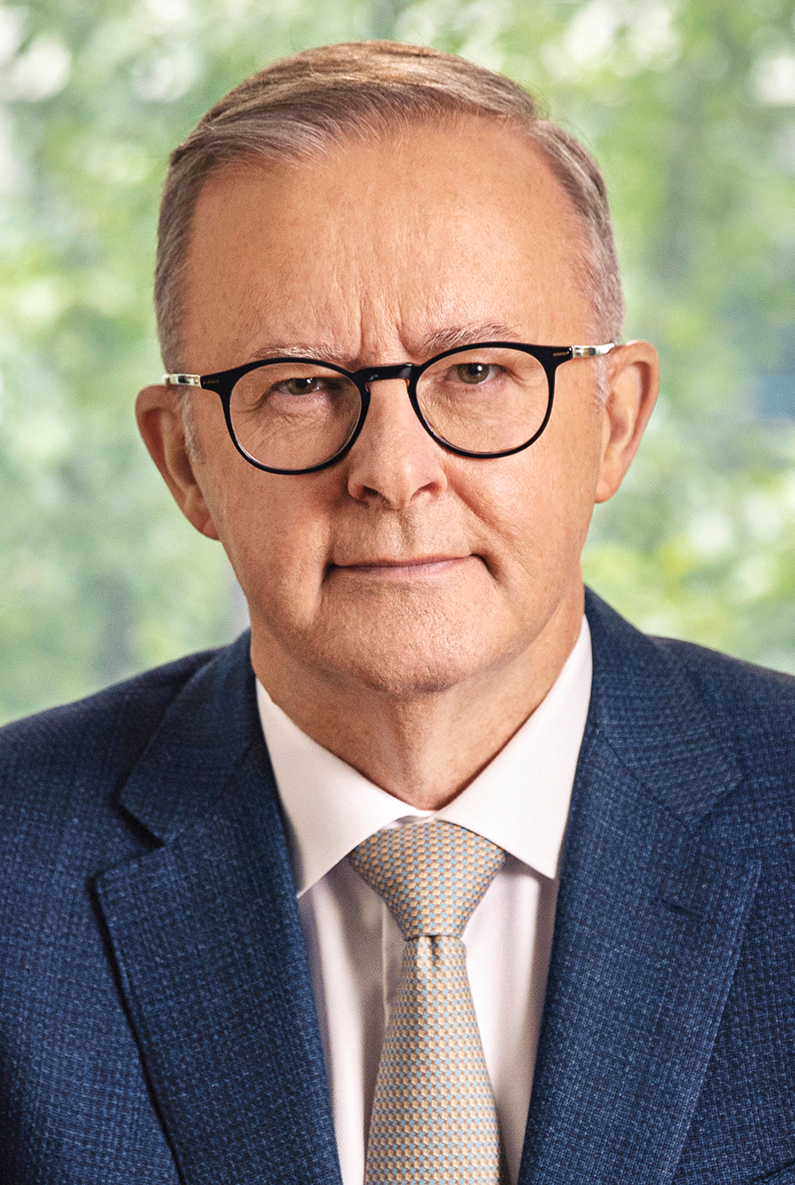
Anthony Albanese

Deputy Prime Minister

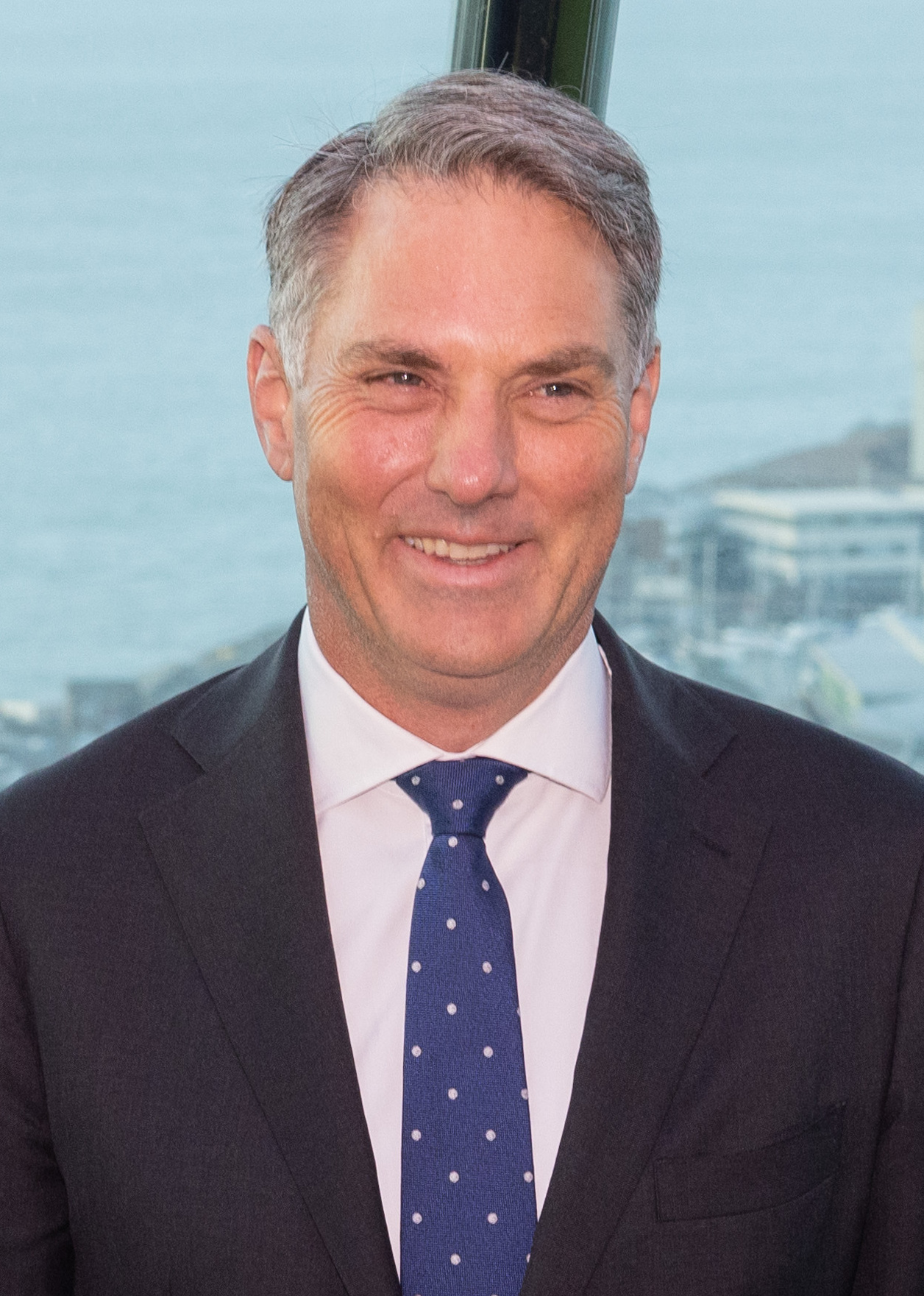
Richard Marles

Opposition Leader

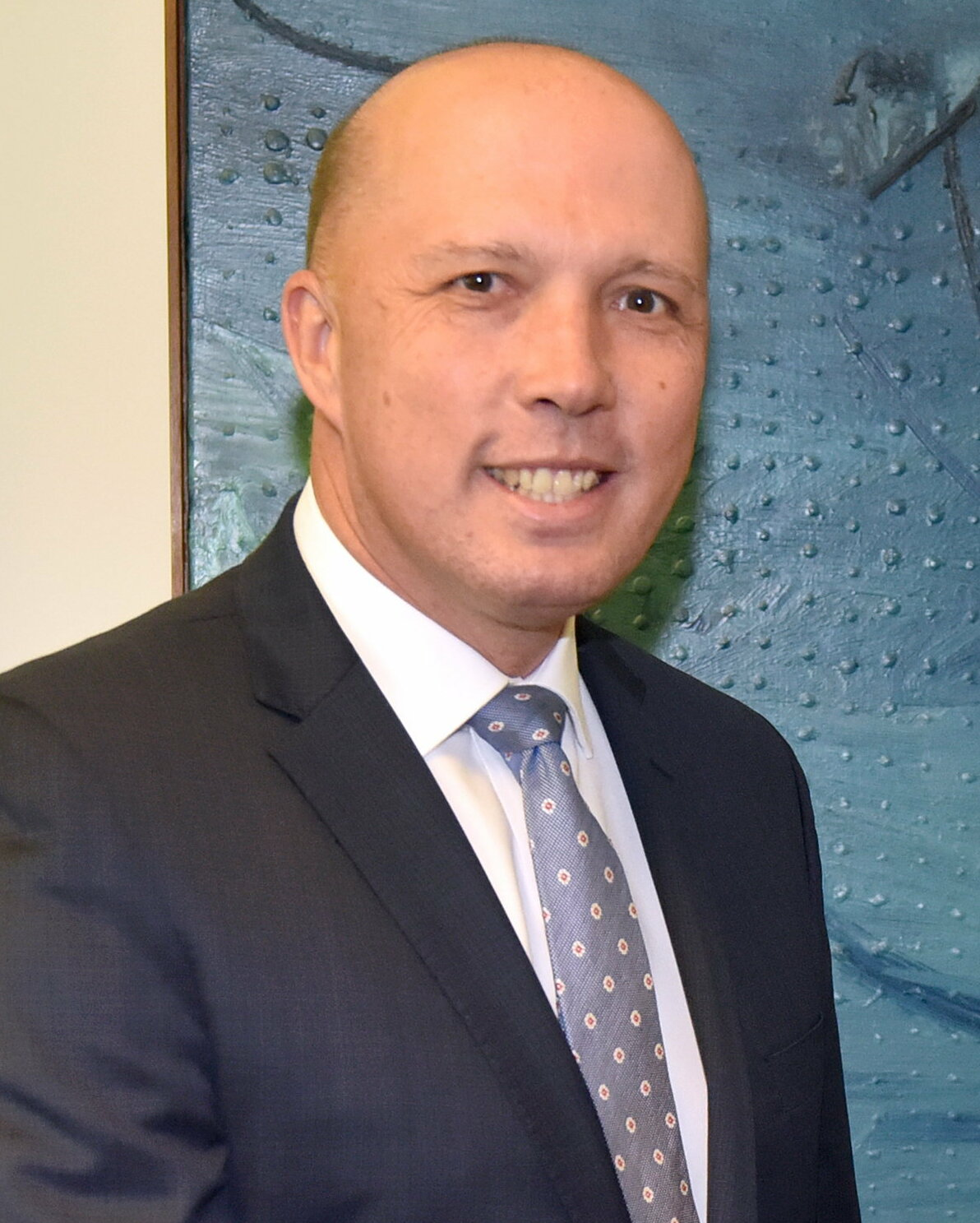
Peter Dutton

Chief Justice

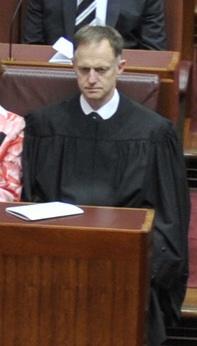
Stephen Gageler

=== State and territory leaders ===
- Premier of New South Wales – Chris Minns
  - Opposition Leader – Mark Speakman
- Premier of Queensland – Steven Miles (until 28 October), then David Crisafulli
  - Opposition Leader – David Crisafulli (until 28 October), then Steven Miles
- Premier of South Australia – Peter Malinauskas
  - Opposition Leader – David Speirs (until 8 August), then Vincent Tarzia
- Premier of Tasmania – Jeremy Rockliff
  - Opposition Leader – Rebecca White (until 10 April), then Dean Winter
- Premier of Victoria – Jacinta Allan
  - Opposition Leader – John Pesutto (until 27 December), then Brad Battin
- Premier of Western Australia – Roger Cook
  - Opposition Leader – Shane Love
- Chief Minister of the Australian Capital Territory – Andrew Barr
  - Opposition Leader – Elizabeth Lee (until 31 October), then Leanne Castley
- Chief Minister of the Northern Territory – Eva Lawler (until 28 August), then Lia Finocchiaro
  - Opposition Leader – Lia Finocchiaro (until 28 August), then Selena Uibo (from 3 September)

=== Governors and administrators ===
- Governor of New South Wales – Margaret Beazley
- Governor of Queensland – Jeannette Young
- Governor of South Australia – Frances Adamson
- Governor of Tasmania – Barbara Baker
- Governor of Victoria – Margaret Gardner
- Governor of Western Australia – Chris Dawson
- Administrator of the Australian Indian Ocean Territories – Farzian Zainal
- Administrator of Norfolk Island – George Plant
- Administrator of the Northern Territory – Hugh Heggie

== Events ==
=== January ===
- 1 January –
  - It becomes illegal to import disposable vapes into Australia.
  - As Victoria transitions to clean energy, the state imposes a ban on natural gas connections for new dwellings, apartment buildings and residential subdivisions.
  - Federal Cabinet documents from 2003 are made public for the first time. Controversy arises when it's discovered the Morrison Government failed to hand over some documents relating to Australia's involvement in the 2003 invasion of Iraq to the National Archives in 2020 for public release. Anthony Albanese announces an inquiry will be held to find out whether or not the documents were withheld intentionally.
- 4 January – Australian Defence Force (ADF) personnel arrive in South East Queensland after being deployed to help the region in the aftermath of severe weather over the Christmas/New Year period. In Far North Queensland, there are also calls for ADF assistance to help with the clean-up following severe weather caused by Cyclone Jasper.
- 5 January – Queensland premier Steven Miles announces a $5 million funding agreement between the state and federal government which would see discounted flights and accommodation being offered to tourists to entice them back to Far North Queensland following Cyclone Jasper.
- 8 January – The New South Wales Police Force claim to have dismantled a criminal syndicate allegedly attempting to export more than a million dollars of Australian reptiles, including 257 lizards, to Hong Kong.
- 9 January – Prime minister Anthony Albanese warns Australian supermarkets to pass on savings to consumers stating: "It's not acceptable to see record profits at a time when people are doing it so tough." He announces former Labor minister Craig Emerson will lead a review of the Food and Grocery Code of Conduct while Queensland premier Steven Miles writes to the CEOs of Woolworths, Coles, Aldi Süd, and IGA expressing concern about the disparity between retail prices and the amount farmers are paid. The Coalition also call for an Australian Competition & Consumer Commission inquiry, accusing the supermarkets of imposing excessive retail markups.
- 10 January –
  - Prime minister Anthony Albanese announces financial support for flood victims in Victoria as Murchison experiences moderate flooding with the Goulburn River peaking at 10.47 metres, with an expected peak of 10.4 metres at Shepparton on 13 January.
  - Transport for NSW confirms a park built above the Sydney's Rozelle Interchange has been closed to the public just three weeks after it opened due to the discovery of asbestos in mulch around a children's playground. The discovery prompts an urgent audit to determine the number of other sites which could be affected.
  - Woolworths Group confirms that Woolworths and Big W will no longer be stocking Australia Day-themed merchandise citing declining sales and the broader discussion about the national holiday. Liberal Opposition Leader Peter Dutton calls for a boycott on Woolworths for its decision.
- 14 January – Mary Donaldson becomes the first Australian-born queen consort of a European monarchy when she is proclaimed Queen of Denmark when her husband Frederik X ascends the throne following the abdication of his mother Margrethe II. The decision to mark the occasion by temporarily replacing the Aboriginal flag with the Danish flag at Parliament House in Hobart sparks criticism from some in Tasmania's Aboriginal community.
- 15 January –
  - Foreign minister Penny Wong travels to the Middle East to renew calls for a ceasefire in the Israel-Gaza war.
  - A legal challenge by a group of Tiwi Islanders in an attempt to stop the construction of the Santos gas pipeline in the Timor Sea is dismissed by Justice Natalie Charlesworth who lifts a temporary injunction allowing Santos to begin construction work.
- 21 January – The Victorian Liberal and National opposition announced that they would be withdrawing its support for a state treaty, reversing their previous support for the proposal. This follows the Queensland opposition reversing their support in October 2023.
- 24 January – The Bureau of Statistics' population clock ticks over to estimate Australia's population has reached 27 million.
- 25 January – Cyclone Kirrily crosses the North Queensland coast at Townsville as a Category 3 system before weakening.
- 27 January – Queensland state Labor MP Jim Madden resigns from parliament to vie for a position as a local councillor with Ipswich City Council in the 2024 Queensland local elections on 16 March. Madden's resignation triggers the 2024 Ipswich West state by-election which premier Steven Miles recommends to be held on 16 March - the same day as the local elections and the 2024 Inala state by-election.

=== February ===
- 1 February – Former New South Wales police officer Daniel Keneally, the son of former premier and senator Kristina Keneally, receives a 15-month intensive corrective services order after having been found guilty in November 2023 of fabricating evidence.
- 4 February – 51-year-old Samantha Murphy disappears after leaving her home in Ballarat to go for her regular morning run. Her disappearance triggers a widespread search and appeal from police for CCTV or dashcam vision from the day she disappeared.
- 5 February – Australian writer Yang Hengjun receives a suspended death sentence in Beijing, five years after being charged with spying and imprisoned in China.
- 6 February – The Australian Parliament returns for the first sitting day of 2024.
- 8 February – Labor's Right to Disconnect bill passes the Senate but they are forced into an attempt to introduce additional legislation to reverse an amendment which allows for criminal penalties for employers who breach a Fair Work Commission order to stop contacting workers.
- 9 February – Reserve Bank of Australia governor Michele Bullock appears before a parliamentary hearing for the first time where she says she doesn't agree with the International Monetary Fund that Australia should be lifting interest rates higher.
- 10 February – Sitting Liberal MP David Honey loses preselection for the next Australian federal election, being defeated by Sandra Brewer.
- 12 February –
  - Liverpool West Public School in Sydney is closed after the New South Wales Environment Protection Authority confirms bonded asbestos has been discovered in garden mulch at the school. Students and staff at the school are subsequently relocated to Gulyangarri Public School for the foreseeable future. Contaminated mulch is also discovered at Campbelltown Hospital, prompting part of the hospital to be closed off to the public.
  - Queensland Greens MP Amy MacMahon is seriously injured in a two-vehicle car accident at Kangaroo Point.
- 14 February –
  - Premier of Tasmania Jeremy Rockliff calls an early election in Tasmania after becoming a minority government.
  - It is announced that Sydney's annual Mardi Gras Fair Day scheduled for 18 February is cancelled due to the discovery of asbestos in Victoria Park amid Sydney's asbestos contamination crisis.
- 15 February – Anthony Albanese releases a joint statement with Canadian prime minister Justin Trudeau and New Zealand prime minister Christopher Luxon to express their concerns over Israel's plan for a ground offensive in Rafah. The joint statement is issued after Australian foreign minister Penny Wong expresses her own concerns, describing any ground invasion of Rafah as "unjustifiable".
- 16 February –
  - The Sydney asbestos crisis worsens as the New South Wales Environment Protection Authority confirms bonded asbestos has been discovered in mulch at a Woolworths supermarket in Kellyville, the St John of God Hospital in North Richmond and a park in Wiley Park. The list of contaminated sites now totals more than twenty sites. In each case, the contaminated mulch is traced back to a waste facility in Bringelly.
  - Two groups of approximately 25 foreign nationals are discovered in Beagle Bay, Western Australia after they are believed to have travelled from Indonesia by boat, prompting Australian Border Force officials to travel to the coastal town to question the men. The arrival of the men prompts federal opposition leader Peter Dutton to accuse Anthony Albanese's government of weakening Australia's border protection arrangements. In turn, Albanese accused Dutton of politicising the incident and undermining the country's border protection regime. Another group of foreign nationals are discovered at a remote campsite north of Beagle Bay the following day.
- 17 February – Sitting Liberal MP Ian Goodenough loses preselection for the next Australian federal election, being defeated by Vince Connelly.
- 19 February –
  - Northern Territory Country Liberal MP Joshua Burgoyne is charged by NT Police with careless driving causing serious harm after a two-vehicle accident in Alice Springs on 26 August 2023, and will face court for the first mention of the alleged offence on 4 March 2024.
  - Former Australian Greens leader Bob Brown is arrested for trespassing at an anti-logging protest in Tasmania.
  - Asbestos-contaminated mulch is found at another seven locations in Sydney, bringing the total to 41 separate sites.
- 20 February –
  - Queensland Police Service commissioner Katarina Carroll announces she is stepping down from her position on 1 March 2024, five months before her contract expires.
  - Labor senator for Western Australia Louise Pratt announces she will step down at the 2025 Australian federal election citing health reasons.
- 21 February – Christopher Saunders, the former Catholic Bishop of Broome, is arrested in Broome by the Western Australia Police Force Child Abuse Squad and taken into custody. He is subsequently charged with 19 offences dating back to 2008. Saunders' arrest comes after police raided a Broome property on 15 January 2024.
- 26 February – The Board of the Sydney Gay and Lesbian Mardi Gras withdraws their invitation to the NSW Police Force to march in the 2024 Mardi Gras amid the investigation into the alleged murders of television presenter Jesse Baird and his partner Luke Davies. The Australian Federal Police confirm the following day that they have made the decision to also withdraw from marching in the Mardi Gras parade.
- 27 February –
  - Two bodies are found at Bungonia, near Goulburn, New South Wales, likely to be those of Jesse Baird and Luke Davies. The bodies are discovered four days after a New South Wales police officer was charged with their murders.
  - Former prime minister Scott Morrison delivers his final speech as a member of the Australian Parliament.
  - The Albanese government's legislation for modifying the stage three tax cuts passes the Senate in an evening sitting.
  - Justice Glenn Martin rules that COVID-19 vaccination mandates for some Queensland frontline workers breached section 58 of the Human Rights Act and declared directives given to Queensland Police Service staff were unlawful. Queensland premier Steven Miles responds by saying the state government was seeking crown law advice but that he stands by the actions taken by the government during the COVID-19 pandemic in Queensland.
- 28 February – An agreement is reached between the Sydney Gay and Lesbian Mardi Gras Board and the NSW Police Force, which sees gay and lesbian liaison police officers permitted to march in the annual parade, but without their uniforms or weapons.
- 29 February –
  - Cumberland City Council votes to ban drag queen storytime from council events.
  - Australian Greens senator Janet Rice is censured after holding a placard denouncing human rights abuses in the Philippines while President Bongbong Marcos was addressing Parliament.

=== March ===
- 2 March –
  - A by-election is held in the federal seat of Dunkley which is won by Jodie Belyea who retains the seat for the Australian Labor Party following the death of Peta Murphy in December 2023.
  - The 46th Sydney Gay and Lesbian Mardi Gras street parade is held, which begins with a moment of silence to commemorate the lives of Jesse Baird and Luke Davies.
- 4 March – Simon Kennedy is selected by the Liberal Party to run as their candidate in the 2024 Cook by-election following the resignation of Scott Morrison.
- 6 March –
  - Qantas is convicted and fined $250,000 for illegally standing down an employee during the COVID-19 pandemic.
  - The Queensland Parliament passes an omnibus bill which will see coercive control become a criminal offence with stealthing also to be criminalised in Queensland.
- 7 March –
  - A 22-year-old man is arrested in connection to the disappearance of Samantha Murphy and is subsequently charged with murder.
  - Katter's Australian Party leader Robbie Katter and deputy leader Nick Dametto are referred to the Queensland Government's Ethics Committee after confronting pro-Palestinian protestors outside Parliament House in Brisbane.
- 16 March –
  - The 2024 Queensland local elections are held which sees Adrian Schrinner re-elected as the Lord Mayor of Brisbane.
  - The 2024 Inala state by-election is held which sees Labor retain the seat. Despite a significant swing against the government being recorded, Labor's candidate Margie Nightingale defeats LNP candidate Trang Yen.
  - The 2024 Ipswich West state by-election is held which sees Labor lose the seat, with LNP candidate Darren Zanow defeating Labor's Wendy Bourne after a significant swing against the government is recorded.
- 18 March – Pro-Palestinian protestors disrupt Question Time at Parliament House in Canberra.
- 20 March –
  - In an interview with Nigel Farage on GB News, former United States president Donald Trump threatens to oust Australian ambassador Kevin Rudd from his position if he shows any hostility should Trump again become president.
  - Foreign minister Penny Wong meets her Chinese counterpart Wang Yi in Canberra for the Australia-China Foreign and Strategic Dialogue. Prior to Wang's meeting with former prime minister Paul Keating the following day, Wong warns that Keating is "entitled to his views" but that "he does not speak for the government nor the country."
- 21 March – Chinese foreign minister Wang Yi hosts former Australian prime minister Paul Keating at the China consulate in Sydney.
- 23 March –
  - The 2024 Tasmanian state election is held. Neither major party achieves an outright majority, resulting in a hung parliament.
  - The 2024 Dunstan state by-election is held in South Australia which is triggered by the resignation of Steven Marshall. The result sees Labor candidate Cressida O'Hanlon become the new member, defeating Liberal candidate Anna Finizio.
  - Former NSW state transport minister Andrew Constance wins pre-selection to contest the seat of Gilmore at the 2025 federal election.
- 25 March –
  - Federal Liberal MP Rowan Ramsey announces he will not be recontesting the next Australian federal election.
- 26 March –
  - Violence and unrest breaks out in Alice Springs which leads to Northern Territory chief minister Eva Lawler declaring a state of emergency and the introduction of a two-week curfew for under 18's. There are also calls for federal intervention.
  - It is revealed a wild magpie which had been visiting a Gold Coast couple and bonding with their English staffy since they rescued it as a chick in 2020 had been "voluntarily surrendered" to DESI who accused the couple of taking the magpie from the wild and keeping it unlawfully. The magpie's seizure draws widespread condemnation with Queensland premier Steven Miles stating that common sense needed to prevail in this instance and that he would support the authorities to work with the couple so they could obtain the appropriate permits.
- 28 March –
  - Australian Defence Force chief Angus Campbell issues an unreserved apology on the final day of the Royal Commission into Defence and Veteran Suicide for deficiencies in the way the service provided support for veterans during and after their service.
  - Sally Capp announces she will stand down as the Lord Mayor of Melbourne in June, ahead of the 2024 Victorian local elections in October.
  - Prime minister Anthony Albanese, energy minister Chris Bowen, and industry minister Ed Husic travel to the former Liddell Power Station in the Hunter Valley to announce a $1 billion solar panel program. However, it is later revealed they travelled into the area on two separate private jets which landed at Scone Airport which is met with criticism and accusations of hypocrisy. When questioned about the issue, Bowen said the decision was made by the RAAF.

=== April ===
- 2 April – Foreign minister Penny Wong confirms an Australian World Central Kitchen aid worker has been killed in an apparent Israeli air strike in Gaza.
- 3 April – Sam Mostyn is announced as Australia's next Governor-General, succeeding David Hurley. Some right-wing commentators such as Sky News Australia host Chris Kenny and former executive director of the libertarian think tank Institute of Public Affairs, John Roskam, politician Pauline Hanson, and conservative lobby group Advance Australia, criticised the appointment owing to her past activism, which included having referred to Australia Day as "Invasion Day" and support for Australia to become a republic.
- 4 April – The state member of the Northern Tablelands Adam Marshall announces he will leave the New South Wales Parliament in May to pursue employment in the private sector. Marshall's impending resignation will trigger the 2024 Northern Tablelands state by-election.
- 4–6 April – Intense torrential rainfall affects parts of New South Wales and Queensland, with the Greater Sydney region, the Mid North Coast and the Illawarra being among the areas worst affected. The Warragamba Dam spills over with authorities also expecting the Woronora Dam, Cataract Dam and Nepean Dam to overflow.
- 9 April –
  - A 21-year-old man appears in the Magistrates Court in Ballarat, Victoria charged with the murder of his 23-year-old ex-partner Hannah McGuire whose body was found in a burnt out car in Scarsdale on 5 April. McGuire's death is the third such death in the Ballarat area allegedly caused by a male perpetrator following the alleged murders of Rebecca Young and Samantha Murphy, which sparks a national conversation about the prevention of violence against women, and the organisation of a snap rally to protest against men's violence.
  - Foreign minister Penny Wong uses a speech at the Australian National University in Canberra to announce that the Australian Government is considering recognising Palestinian statehood, and repeats that the international recognition of Palestine as a state could assist in building momentum towards a two-state solution for Israel and Palestine. Her comments provoke widespread debate and criticism.
  - The Tasmania Civil and Administrative Tribunal finds the Museum of Old and New Art in Hobart had engaged in direct discrimination after refusing a man entry into the "Ladies Lounge" exhibit during his visit in April 2023. The museum is ordered to stop refusing entry to people who do not identify as "ladies" within 28 days.
- 13 April –
  - Six people are killed in a mass stabbing at Westfield Bondi Junction shopping centre in Sydney. The offender is shot dead by police inspector Amy Scott who is praised for her actions. John Singleton's daughter Dawn and Kerry Good's daughter Ashlee are among the victims who were fatally stabbed. A security officer who was working at the centre is also stabbed to death.
  - The 2024 Cook by-election is held, which is easily won by Liberal candidate Simon Kennedy who achieves 62.61% of the first preference vote, defeating his nearest rival Greens candidate Martin Moore who attracts 16.68% of the first preference vote.
- 15 April –
  - Bruce Lehrmann loses the civil defamation case he brought against Network 10 and Lisa Wilkinson in the Federal Court, with Justice Michael Lee finding on the balance of probabilities that Lehrmann raped Brittany Higgins.
  - 2024 Wakeley stabbing: Four people, including Bishop Mar Mari Emmanuel, are injured in a mass stabbing inside the Christ The Good Shepherd Church operated by the Assyrian Church of the East in Wakeley, New South Wales.
- 16 April –
  - Australia's e-safety commissioner Julie Inman Grant orders X and Meta to remove footage of the stabbing of Mar Mari Emmanuel. The order is met with resistance from Elon Musk and prompts a protracted debate about free speech, with Musk refusing to delete the videos although it had blocked the content in Australia. A two-day injunction to compel X to hide posts that include the footage of the attack was later extended to 10 May 2024.
  - Outgoing Woolworths Group CEO Brad Banducci is threatened with jail time after failing to answer a question put to him by Greens senator Nick McKim during a Senate inquiry into supermarket pricing.
  - Authorities report the worst mass coral bleaching incident on the Great Barrier Reef on record.
- 17 April – New research released by The Australia Institute finds that red imported fire ants will likely cost Australians more than $22 billion by the 2040s if eradications efforts are unsuccessful.
- 22 April – Steve Gollschewski is named as Queensland's new police commissioner, succeeding Katarina Carroll.
- 25 April – Annual ANZAC Day commemorations are held throughout Australia. Prime Minister Anthony Albanese attends the dawn service at Isurava in Papua New Guinea after completing the Kokoda Track with James Marape.
- 26 April – Weekend rallies against gender-based violence commence being held across Australia organised by advocacy group What Were You Wearing, as part of a nationwide campaign to end violence against women. Prime Minister Anthony Albanese's appearance at the rally in Canberra on 28 April ends in controversy when his claims that his requests to speak at the rally had been declined were described by organiser Sarah Williams as a "full out lie" who then breaks down in tears.
- 30 April – The Queensland Civil and Administrative Tribunal clears the former mayor of Rockhampton and current 2024 state election independent candidate Margaret Strelow of allegations of misconduct which prompted her resignation as mayor in 2020, triggering the controversial 2021 Rockhampton Region mayoral by-election.

=== May ===
- 4 May – Queensland's assistant minister for health Brittany Lauga alleges she was drugged and then sexually assaulted on 28 April 2024 during a night out in Yeppoon, with the alleged incident filmed by bystanders who then post the video on Snapchat.
- 6 May – Queensland premier Steven Miles uses Labour Day to announce that the state's public servants will soon be entitled to ten days paid leave to access reproductive health care at a cost of $80 million each year. A pro-Palestine protestor is later arrested for allegedly throwing eggs at Miles during the annual Labour Day March in Brisbane.
- 7 May – The Reserve Bank of Australia announces it will leave the interest rate steady at 4.35%.
- 8 May – Cumberland City Council votes to ban books depicting same-sex relationships from their libraries, citing "sexualisation" concerns. The ban receives condemnation from a number of Labor public figures and organisations, such as environment minister Tanya Plibersek, several ministers in the NSW government, the NSW Council for Civil Liberties, independent federal MP Allegra Spender, and Equality Australia.
- 10 May –
  - Bruce Lehrmann is ordered by the Federal Court of Australia to pay most of Network 10's legal fees following his failed defamation case against the network and journalist Lisa Wilkinson.
  - Norio Nagata, the vice-speaker of Minokama city assembly in Gifu Prefecture in central Japan resigns after an alleged incident involving the daughter of Dubbo mayor Mathew Dickerson in which Nagata allegedly sexually harassed her at a karaoke afterparty following a welcome reception on 3 April. Minokamo's mayor Hiroto Fujii had earlier issued an apology to its sister city, which Dickerson accepted.
- 11 May – Federal agricultural minister Murray Watt announces that Western Australia's live sheep export trade will end from 1 May 2028. While the RSPCA welcomes the move, the announcement is condemned by Nationals leader David Littleproud, Western Australian opposition leader Shane Love, National Farmers' Federation CEO Tony Maher and WA Livestock president Geoff Pearson. Western Australian premier Roger Cook also criticises the support package announced for farmers to transition away from live exports.
- 14 May –
  - David McBride is sentenced to five years and eight months jail after pleading guilty to stealing and sharing classified military documents, which were then used by the Australian Broadcasting Corporation for the program The Afghan Files, to broadcast allegations of Australian soldiers being involved in illegal killings.
  - Treasurer Jim Chalmers delivers the 2024 Australian federal budget.
- 15 May –
  - The Tasmanian Civil and Administrative Tribunal dismisses an appeal against Hobart City Council's decision to remove a statue of Tasmanian premier William Crowther. However before the decision was delivered, vandals had cut the statue down and sprayed graffiti on the plinth.
  - Labor senator Fatima Payman accuses Israel of genocide and calls on her own party to cease trade with Israel. Her comments, particularly her use of the controversial phrase "From the river to the sea" draw widespread condemnation.
- 16 May –
  - The Federal Court of Australia rules that federal environment minister Tanya Plibersek does not need to consider environmental impacts of emissions when she gives approvals for gas or coal projects.
  - Australians are urged to reconsider their need to travel to New Caledonia after violent riots break out in the French territory. Foreign minister Penny Wong later states that Australia is working with authorities to assess options to ensure the safe return of Australians who are stranded in New Caledonia.
  - Snowtown murders accomplice 65-year-old Mark Ray Haydon is released from the Adelaide pre-release centre and back into the general community after spending 25 years in jail for being an accessory to Australia's worst serial killings.
- 18 May – A Victorian Labor Party conference at Moonee Valley Racecourse attended by Australian prime minister Anthony Albanese is stormed by pro-Palestinian protestors prompting a major security alert.
- 19 May – Six people are arrested in Melbourne after pro-Palestinian protestors descend on the pro-Israel "Stop the Hate, Mate" rally held on the steps of Parliament House and organised by a Christian group called Never Again is Now.
- 22 May – Agriculture Victoria confirms the H7N3 strain of avian influenza has been detected at an egg farm in Victoria, forcing hundreds of thousands of chickens to be euthanased. The Victorian Department of Health also confirm there had previously been a human case of the H5N1 strain of avian influenza after a child returning from overseas tested positive in March, but who has since recovered.
- 24 May – 59-year-old Jennifer Petelczyc and her 18-year-old daughter Gretl are murdered by 63-year-old Mark James Bombara who then shoots himself dead in the Perth suburb of Floreat. Bombara's daughter subsequently accuses the Western Australia Police Force of repeatedly ignoring her requests for help with her father. Federal social services minister Amanda Rishworth also describes the response from the Western Australia Police Force prior to the murders as "inadequate."
- 25 May - Australia's largest Jewish school in Melbourne is vandalized with graffiti.
- 30 May – The "Keep the Sheep" campaign is launched by Western Australia's agricultural sector, protesting the Federal Government's decision to end live sheep exports. The campaign's launch is preceded by a large protest rally in Perth the following day in which trucks and farm vehicles were used to bring traffic to a crawl in the Perth CBD.

=== June ===
- 1 June – Deputy prime minister Richard Marles is confronted by officers from China's People's Liberation Army at the Shangri-La Dialogue conference in Singapore after they took issue with Marles' speech.
- 2 June – The body of Natasha Ryan is discovered on a golf course in Rockhampton. Police say there are no suspicious circumstances.
- 6 June – The National Anti-Corruption Commission announces it will not pursue new corruption investigations into six public officials associated with the Robodebt scheme, despite receiving referrals from Catherine Holmes following the Royal Commission into the Robodebt Scheme.
- 7 June – Queensland premier Steven Miles announces that Peter Andrews, Natalie Cook, Keri Craig-Lee, Scott Hutchinson, Getano Lui (Jnr), Sir Bruce Small and LifeFlight Australia have been named as the 2024 Queensland Greats.
- 9 June – The 2024 King's Birthday Honours list is announced, in which Daniel Andrews, Karen Canfell, Simon Crean, Mark McGowan, Jonathan Mills and Samantha Mostyn are all made a Companion of the Order of Australia.
- 15 June – It's reported approximately 300 executive positions from Transport for NSW are expected to be abolished over a period of three years.
- 16 June – Several hundred protestors gather outside Adelaide Zoo during a visit by Chinese premier Li Qiang who announces two new pandas will be loaned to the zoo when Wang Wang and Fu Ni return to China.
- 17 June – Bird flu (H7N9) spreads to a seventh Australian poultry farm.
- 18 June – Former treasurer of New South Wales Matt Kean announces his resignation from politics. Prime Minister Anthony Albanese subsequently announces Kean as the new chair of the Climate Change Authority.
- 19 June –
  - The Melbourne office of Labor MP Josh Burns is extensively damaged by pro-Palestinian protestors who vandalise the office by smashing windows, pouring paint and starting fires. Prime Minister Anthony Albanese condemns the attack and said the targeting of a Jewish MP was "very distressing".
  - Leader of the Opposition Peter Dutton and the Liberal party reveal seven sites for their proposed nuclear power plants.
  - A delegation of Australian senior ministers including Richard Marles, Penny Wong and Pat Conroy arrive in Papua New Guinea at attend the 30th Ministerial Forum in Port Moresby. During the visit, Australia announces a range of initiatives under a bilateral security agreement with Papua New Guinea.
- 20 June –
  - Bronnie Taylor steps down as deputy leader of the New South Wales National Party and announces she will be leaving politics in August. Gurmesh Singh is subsequently elected as the party's new deputy leader.
  - Western Australian upper house MP Louise Kingston resigns from the Western Australian National Party and accuses opposition leader Shane Love of bullying and harassment. Love denies Kingston's allegations.
- 30 June – Labor senator Fatima Payman says that she has been indefinitely suspended from the Labor caucus following an interview on ABC TV's Insiders program where she said she would cross the floor again if need be. A Labor spokesperson confirms that Payman had been suspended because she had "placed herself outside the privilege" of participating in the caucus but would be permitted to return when she decides to respect the caucus and her colleagues.

=== July ===
- 1 July –
  - The Australian Government raises the visa fee for international students from A$710 (US$473) to A$1,600 (US$1,068) in an attempt to curb record levels of migration claimed to exacerbate pressure on the Australian housing market.
  - Sam Mostyn is sworn in as the 28th Governor-General of Australia.
- 2 July – Australia issues statements to several social media and search engine websites commanding them to draft and enforce guidelines to prevent minors from seeing inappropriate material by 3 October, or else the companies will face national restrictions.
- 4 July – Protestors target Parliament House in Canberra, with climate change protestors gluing themselves to bollards in the foyer while pro-Palestinian protestors climb onto the roof to unfurl banners.
- 7 July – Bill Shorten confirms sex work will no longer be funded through the NDIS under planned reforms.
- 11 July – Prime Minister Anthony Albanese commences announcing Labor candidates for the 2025 Australian federal election.
- 12 July – John Setka resigns as secretary of the Victorian branch of the CFMEU, citing pressure from "relentless" media coverage. Setka's resignation came just before Nine newspapers published serious allegations of corruption within the CFMEU. Federal workplace relations minister Tony Burke indicates he sought advice on how to respond to the allegations.
- 15 July - During his weekly spot on local radio station 4RO, Queensland Labor MP Barry O'Rourke admits he uses the electoral roll to obtain addresses of people who leave negative comments on his Facebook page so he can visit them in person, which prompts accusations of intimidation from federal LNP MP Michelle Landry and One Nation's James Ashby. However, premier Steven Miles defends O'Rourke, describing it as "a entirely appropriate use of the electoral roll."
- 17 July – The allegations of serious misconduct within the CFMEU continues to have repercussions with federal workplace minister Tony Burke asking the Australian Federal Police to investigation the allegations, describing the alleged conduct as "abhorrent" and "intolerable." The ACTU also suspends the construction and general division of the CFMEU as it calls on its members to support the appointment of an independent administrator. New South Wales premier Chris Minns also moves to suspend the union from the NSW Labor Party and seeks to stop the party receiving donations from the union. Anthony Albanese also confirms the Queensland branch will also be affected by the decision to appoint an administrator.
- 18 July – The Australian Labor Party's national executive cuts ties with the CFMEU's construction division, suspending the affiliation with the New South Wales, Victoria, South Australia and Tasmanian branches of the ALP.
- 25 July –
  - A former coal miner becomes the first Australian to win a black lung disease case at trial and is awarded $3.2 million in damages after being diagnosed with pneumoconiosis in 2018, having worked in coal mines in New South Wales and Queensland.
  - The Federal Court of Australia rules that there is insufficient evidence that weedkiller Roundup causes cancer, dismissing a major class action against parent companies Monsanto and Bayer.
- 28 July – Roughly 40 members of the Victorian chapter of the far-right National Socialist Network hold a flash rally, where they marched from Melbourne's Fed Square to Flinders Street Station, clad in all black and carrying a large "Mass Deportations Now" banner. One person was "arrested at the scene and was interviewed for grossly offensive public conduct," a spokesperson for Victoria Police said.
- 30 July – Victoria's health department confirms 33 people have been diagnosed with Legionnaires' disease within an outbreak affecting the northern and western suburbs of Melbourne.

=== August ===
- 1 August –
  - Foreign minister Penny Wong advises Australians in Lebanon to leave immediately as tensions increase between Israel and Hezbollah following the assassination of Hamas leader Ismail Haniyeh in Iran.
  - The Queensland Government's ban on new gas exploration throughout the Channel Country comes into effect, stopping any new fracking projects after amendments were made to the Regional Planning Interest Regulation Act 2014.
- 2 August –One Nation's only state MP in the Queensland parliament Stephen Andrew confirms that he has received a letter from party leader Pauline Hanson advising him that she would not be endorsing him as the candidate for Mirani at the 2024 Queensland state election, prompting Andrew to leave the party.
- 3 August – Northern Territory police commissioner Michael Murphy uses a speech at the Garma Festival to publicly apologise to "Aboriginal Territorians for the past harms and the injustices caused by members of the Northern Territory police."
- 5 August – Prime minister Anthony Albanese announces that the government has elevated Australia's terrorism threat from "possible" to "probable" but that it did not mean a terrorist attack was "inevitable."
- 6 August – Prime minister Anthony Albanese confirms the ambassador of Iran to Australia Ahmad Sadeghi had received a diplomatic rebuke from the Department of Foreign Affairs and Trade for comments he had made on social media where he called for a "wiping out" of Israelis in Palestine and referring to Israelis as a "zionist plague".
- 7 August – The water temperature around the Great Barrier Reef is reported to have reached a 400-year record high, which is causing more mass bleaching events.
- 8 August – Queensland health minister Shannon Fentiman announces that the National Mental Health Commission will launch an investigation in the Wolston Park mental health institution which closed in 2001, after decades of allegations relating to sexual abuse, beatings and chemical restraint which allegedly occurred between the 1950s and 1980s.
- 9 August – With 107 confirmed cases of Legionnaires' disease in Melbourne, Victoria's chief health officer Clare Looker confirms all cases in the outbreak are linked to a cooling tower in the suburb of Laverton North.
- 15 August –
  - Peter Dutton, the leader of Australia's Liberal Party, calls on the Australian government to ban the entry of Palestinian refugees fleeing from conflict in the Gaza Strip, which is met with significant condemnation from several politicians and organizations as promoting racial stereotypes.
  - SBS World News reports that the Australian government has rejected the majority of Palestinian visa applications, accepting 2,922 and rejecting 7,111, compared to the granting of 8,746 visas to Israeli citizens while rejecting only 235.
- 23 August - Justice Robert Bromwich rules that the Giggle for Girls social media platform and its CEO Sall Grover violated the Sex Discrimination Act 1984 by discriminating against transgender woman Roxanne Tickle. The court ordered Grover to pay A$10,000 to Tickle in damages, plus legal costs.
- 24 August –
  - The 2024 Northern Territory general election is held which sees the Country Liberal Party achieve a decisive victory, defeating the Labor Party. Chief minister Eva Lawler, who was also defeated in her own seat of Drysdale by Clinton Howe, concedes defeat to Lia Finocchiaro. The Labor party lost its first mainland state or territory since the 2018 South Australian election.
  - After having been elected in the 2024 Tasmanian state election in March, Bass MP Rebekah Pentland and Braddon MP Miriam Beswick are removed from the Jacqui Lambie Network with the party accusing the two MPs of having a "cosy relationship" with Jeremy Rockliff's Liberal government. The two MPs will remain in parliament as independents.
- 26 August –
  - Australia's right to disconnect laws come into effect.
  - The Albanese Government confirms it has dumped a proposal to including a question about gender identity and sexuality in the 2026 Australian census which draws criticism from the LGBTIQ+ community, lobby groups and politicians.
- 27 August – Thousands protest around Australia in support of the CFMEU, after the federal government passed legislation to circumvent a court process by enabling an administrator to be appointed to the union. Federal Greens MP Max Chandler-Mather is criticised for attending the Brisbane rally where signs were held up depicting Anthony Albanese as Adolf Hitler. Greens leader Adam Bandt defends Chandler-Mather's attendance at the rally describing it as "legitimate" but described the signs and the comparisons as "offensive".
- 30 August –
  - New South Wales state Liberal MP Rory Amon resigns from the party and parliament after police charge him with five counts of sexual intercourse with a person over 10 and under 14. In a statement, Amon confirms he had been charged with events alleged to have occurred in 2017 but denies all charges and says he will make his case in the courts.
  - Another major traffic accident occurs on Queensland's Bruce Highway between Bundaberg and Gladstone when a truck carrying 42 tonnes of ammonium nitrate and a utility collide, killing the ute driver.
  - Anthony Albanese confirms in a radio interview that there would be a question regarding sexuality and gender identity in the 2026 Australian census despite his government earlier confirming they had dumped their proposal to include such a question.
- 31 August – Anthony Albanese denies the federal government had changed its policy regarding the inclusion of a question relating to gender identity and sexuality in the 2026 Australian census.

=== September ===
- 3 September – The takeover of the New South Wales Liberal Party by the federal liberals have an issue with Rob Stokes refusing to serve on the proposed administration committee.
- 8 September – Federal treasurer Jim Chalmers confirms the 2026 Australian census will include questions about sexual orientation and gender with the Australian Bureau of Statistics to determine the questions.
- 9 September –
  - Former Queensland One Nation MP Stephen Andrew announces he has joined Katter's Australian Party, increasing the number of KAP representatives in the Queensland parliament to four.
  - Adelaide newspaper The Advertiser publishes a video and photos which allegedly depict former South Australian Liberal leader David Speirs snorting a white substance. Speirs strenuously denies any wrongdoing, describing the video as a deepfake or an elaborate hoax.
- 10 September – Thousands of protestors attend a national farmer rally in Canberra where the agricultural sector accuses the federal government of initiating numerous anti-farming policies.
- 11 September –
  - Thousands of protestors descend on Melbourne's CBD to rally against the biennial Land Forces International Expo at the MECC, with violent clashes erupting between the protestors and Victoria Police who describe their operation as the most significant since the S11 protests at the World Economic Forum in 2000. (Main article: 2024 Melbourne Land Forces Expo protests)
  - Independent New South Wales MP Alex Greenwich wins his defamation case against Mark Latham, with Latham ordered to pay $160,000 in damages after a tweet about Greenwich published in March 2023 was determined by Justice David O'Callaghan to be defamatory.
- 12 September –
  - Federal defence minister Richard Marles strips the distinguished service medals of up to nine commanding officers who served in the War in Afghanistan, implementing the final recommendation of the Brereton Report which found "credible evidence" Australian soldiers had unlawfully killed 39 people.
  - The Australian Electoral Commission confirms the Division of North Sydney, currently held by Teal independent Kylea Tink, will be abolished at the 2025 Australian federal election.
- 14 September – The 2024 New South Wales local elections are held which sees Clover Moore re-elected to a record sixth term as Lord Mayor of Sydney.
- 20 September –
  - The Mining and Energy Union and five union officials are fined a total of $657,105 after having been found to have breached the Fair Work Act 190 times after targeting strikebreakers during a 2017 industrial dispute at Oakey Creek North coal mine with conduct "designed to intimidate". The MEU was further ordered to pay $10,000 to a worker who was targeted. Among the five union officials to be fined was the MEU's current national vice-president Stephen Smyth who receives an $85,680 fine.
  - At a senate inquiry into antisemitism on university campuses, the University of Sydney's vice-chancellor Mark Scott issues an apology to Jewish students and staff after reading testimonials detailing their experiences during the eight-week Students for Palestine protest, stating "I have failed them and the university has failed them."
- 23 September – Queensland's new sexual consent laws come into effect with the state moving to an affirmative consent model, while stealthing becomes criminalised.
- 27 September – Public figures from the Department of Health and Aged Care show that cases of mpox in Australia have increased by 570% since July 2024, and show that there were 616 new cases of mpox recorded in Australia, bringing the total amount of confirmed cases to 724.

=== October ===
- 1 October –
  - After people gathered at several Shiite Muslim mosques in Sydney to commemorate the death of leader of terrorist group Hezbollah Hassan Nasrallah, prime minister Anthony Albanese declares that nobody in Australia should be mourning Nasrallah's death while opposition leader Peter Dutton calls for memorial services for him to be cancelled.
  - Federal police commissioner Reece Kershaw warns that action would be taken if Hezbollah or Hamas flags were displayed at national pro-Palestinian rallies on 6 October - the eve of the first anniversary of the 2023 Hamas-led attack on Israel.
- 4 October – Federal opposition leader Peter Dutton calls on the expulsion of Iran's ambassador to Australia Ahmad Sadeghi after Sadeghi describes assassinated terrorist leader Hassan Nasrallah as an "unparalleled leader" and a "martyr". Prime minister Anthony Albanese also condemns Sadeghi's comments.
- 5 October – South Australia Police confirm former South Australian opposition leader David Speirs has been charged with two counts of supplying a controlled substance. Spiers says he intends to fight to clear his name and plans to resign from parliament during the next sitting week.
- 6 October – Thousands of pro-Palestinian protestors rally in capital cities on the eve of the 2023 Hamas-led attack on Israel. Although there is a heightened police presence, authorities praise the overall behaviour of the demonstrators.
- 8 October –
  - Jacob Hersant of the National Socialist Network becomes the first Victorian to be found guilty of performing a Nazi salute.
  - Federal opposition leader Peter Dutton accuses prime minister Anthony Albanese of using a motion to mark the first anniversary of the 2023 Hamas-led attack on Israel for personal political gain, with the Coalition refusing the support the motion as they believe it went beyond paying tribute to the 1,200 lives lost.
- 9 October – Former Labor senator Fatima Payman launches the Australia's Voice political party. However, concerns are raised about potential confusion with the Indigenous Voice to Parliament and the 2023 Australian Indigenous Voice referendum with Tom Calma stating that it should be made clear the new party's purpose is not to represent the Voice to Parliament.
- 10 October – A sexual abuse survivor who was one of many to be abused by convicted paedophile Darrell Ray at Melbourne's Beaumaris Primary School in the 1960s and 1970s reveals that he has reached a record $8 million settlement with the Victorian Government with the man's lawyer describing it as "the biggest publicly known payment to an abuse survivor in Australia."
- 12 October – A group of approximately 50 neo-Nazis hold a white supremacist rally in the New South Wales town of Corowa which draws condemnation from community leaders including premier Chris Minns.
- 16 October – The South Australian Legislative Council narrowly votes down 10 to 9, a bill that would ban late-term abortions.
- 17 October – Legislation introduced by the Country Liberal Party (CLP) Northern Territory Government to lower the age of criminal responsibility back to 10 years of age passed the parliament.
- 18 October – The ACT Labor Party is found to have breached electoral laws for running advertisements that were inaccurate and misleading with the ACT Electoral Commission determining an advertisement targeting shadow health minister Leanne Castley contained "a statement purporting to be a statement of fact that is inaccurate and misleading to a material extent".
- 21 October – Senator Lidia Thorpe draws widespread condemnation for screaming obscenities at King Charles III and accusing him of genocide during an event at Parliament House in Canberra before she is escorted from the building by security. Criticism of Thorpe comes from all quarters including from prominent Indigenous Australians such academic Marcia Langton, former senator Nova Peris and Ngunnawal elder Aunty Violet Sheridan. However, Thorpe's conduct is condoned by others including the ACT's Aboriginal and Torres Strait Islander children and young people commissioner Vanessa Turnbull-Roberts.
- 23 October – A five-year legal case concludes on country, where Parks Australia is found guilty of damaging a sacred site in Kakadu National Park and is ordered to pay at $200,000 fine.
- 26 October –
  - The 2024 Queensland state election is held, with the Liberal National Party of Queensland attaining the majority of seats, defeating the Queensland Labor Party, which had been the state's leadership party since 2015. David Crisafulli is sworn in as Premier of Queensland on 28 October.
  - A scandal begins to envelope prime minister Anthony Albanese when journalist Joe Aston claims in his book The Chairman's Lounge: The inside story of how Qantas sold us out that Albanese sought upgrades for himself and his family on Qantas flights by directly contacting Alan Joyce. Albanese denies the accusations, refuting the claims that he had ever contacted anyone at Qantas seeking upgrades and maintains there was always transparency around any perceived flight perks he may have received.
- 30 October –
  - Students record themselves tearing up The Red Zone report into sexual violence at a University of Sydney Students' Representative Council meeting, prompting the university to launch an immediate investigation.
  - NSW Police confirm they have recovered 40,000 limited edition Bluey coins which were allegedly stolen from a Sydney warehouse facility in July 2024. The discovery is made after a third person allegedly involved in the theft, a 27-year-old woman, is arrested and charged with breaking and entering and disposing of stolen property.
- 31 October – Amid the ongoing free flight upgrade scandal, opposition leader Peter Dutton admits he had requested whether he could use Gina Rinehart's private jet to fly from Rockhampton to Sydney for a Bali bombings memorial service before travelling back up to Mackay. Dutton claims he had asked to use the jet to save taxpayers the $40,000 it would have cost to use an RAAF aircraft.

=== November ===
- 1 November –
  - A Federal Court judge rules that One Nation leader Pauline Hanson racially discriminated against Greens deputy leader Mehreen Faruqi when Hanson told Faruiqi to "piss off back to Pakistan" on X after Faruiqi had described Queen Elizabeth II in a post as "a leader of a racist empire" following her death in 2022. The judge orders Hanson to delete the tweet and to pay Faruqui's legal costs. Hanson vows to appeal the judgement.
  - Amid the ongoing flight upgrade scandal, Coalition frontbencher Bridget McKenzie concedes she was wrong to initially be so "emphatic" in her denial of never having received any free flight upgrades.
  - An emperor penguin is discovered on a beach in Denmark, Western Australia, marking the first reported sighting of the species in Australia.
- 6 November –
  - The High Court of Australia strikes down an emergency law requiring migrants with criminal records to wear tracking bracelets and observe a curfew, saying that only judges can impose such punishments.
  - Shadow transport minister Bridget McKenzie apologises after admitting to failing to disclose 16 free flight upgrades between 2015 and 2024.
- 7 November – Prime Minister Albanese confirms that the federal government will introduce legislation later in the month to ban young people under the age of 16 from using social media.
- 10 November – Federal health minister Mark Butler announces that under the National Immunisation Program, pregnant women and newborn babies will have access free respiratory syncytial virus vaccines before winter in 2025, with national access to monoclonal antibody for young babies also to become available.
- 11 November – Remembrance Day services are held throughout the country, and Private Richard Norden is posthumously awarded the Victoria Cross for his exceptional bravery during the Vietnam War.
- 12 November – 31-year-old Connor Fuller is found guilty in the Newcastle Supreme Court of murdering 61-year-old Mark Tozer in a road rage attack at South West Rocks on the New South Wales Mid North Coast on 28 July 2021.
- 14 November – Myer announces it has cancelled the traditional unveiling of its Christmas windows in Melbourne's Bourke Street Mall on 17 November to ensure the safety of its customers and employees due to the threat posed by a pro-Palestinian group called Disrupt Wars which had planned to disrupt the event.
- 16 November – The 2024 Black state by-election is held in South Australia, which was triggered by the resignation of Liberal MP David Speirs who had previously served as the Opposition Leader. The Liberals lose the seat, with their candidate defeated by Labor's Alex Dighton.
- 17 November – Australian Privacy Commissioner Carly Kind rules that Bunnings had breached the privacy of possibly hundreds of thousands of customers by trialing facial recognition technology in 63 stores between 2018 and 2021, finding the company had collected sensitive information without consent and had failed to take reasonable steps to inform people about the technology. Bunnings responds by releasing CCTV footage of staff members being allegedly threatened and assaulted, with managing director Mike Schneider defending the use of the technology stating that its sole intent was to keep team members and customers safe.
- 21 November – Multiple incidents of antisemitic vandalism occur in Sydney which police describe as a hate crime, and which Anthony Albanese calls "deeply troubling".
- 24 November – The government withdraws a bill that would have allowed the Australian Communications and Media Authority to impose a code of conduct or standards for social media companies amid criticism over its effects on free speech.
- 26 November – 55-year-old former Western Australian state Labor MP Barry Urban is allegedly assaulted by a 25-year-old customer at the Kelmscott tyre business he manages following a verbal altercation. Urban suffers serious head injuries and is taken to Royal Perth Hospital in a critical condition. The 25-year-old man subsequently faces Armadale Magistrates Court on five charges relating to the alleged assault. Urban dies on 15 February 2025 from the injuries he sustained in the alleged assault.
- 29 November –
  - Federal parliament passes a law banning people under 16 years of age from holding social media accounts, including YouTube, Facebook, Instagram, WhatsApp, and TikTok.
  - Following a lengthy legal battle, police officer Ben Besant wins the right to have a suppression order and finally be named as the officer who killed Man Haron Monis in the Lindt Cafe siege, just weeks before the 10th anniversary of the siege is commemorated.

=== December ===
- 3 December – The Commonwealth Bank announces it intends to charge its customers a $3 fee to withdraw their own money at bank branches and post offices from January 2025 by migrating them from a "Complete Access" account to a "Smart Access" account. Following widespread criticism, the bank announces the following day that they will "pause" its plans to charge the fee to its customers for six months and will contact affected customers to discuss their options.
- 6 December – The Adass Israel synagogue in Melbourne catches fire in a suspected arson attack.
- 9 December – Queensland health minister Tim Nicholls confirms an investigation has been launched after 323 live virus samples went missing in a major breach of biosecurity protocol at Virology Laboratory in 2021 in which vials of Hendra virus, lyssavirus and hantavirus went missing after a freezer broke down.
- 10 December – Telstra is fined $3 million for failing to comply with emergency call procedures during a Triple Zero outage on 1 March 2024 after the Australian Communications and Media Authority found the company made 473 breaches during the incident.
- 11 December – In what authorities describe as an "antisemitic attack", multiple properties and vehicles in the Sydney suburb of Woollahra are vandalised with anti-Israel graffiti.
- 12 December – Federal Court judge David O'Callaghan rules that Victorian Liberal Party leader John Pesutto defamed former colleague Moira Deeming by conveying an imputation she knowingly associated with white supremacists and neo-Nazis after she attended a "Let Women Speak" rally hosted by Posie Parker on the steps of Parliament House which was gatecrashed by neo-Nazis. Deeming was awarded $300,000 in damages. Harry Potter author J. K. Rowling publicly praised the ruling.
- 15 December –
  - Hundreds of protestors descend on Sydney's Martin Place to call for an end to antisemitism in Australia and to criticise the federal government for their handling of the issue, following attacks in the Sydney suburb of Woollahra and the suspected arson of the Adass Israel Synagogue of Melbourne.
  - New South Wales premier Chris Minns, local federal MP Jason Clare and Jewish leaders have condemned Islamophobic graffiti which appeared in the Sydney suburb of Sefton.
  - In what is believed to be the largest mass exhumation in Australian history, archaeologists finish unearthing and attempting to identify almost 2,000 bodies which were discovered under an old hockey field at The Hutchins School in Hobart during building works. The human remains are transferred to new coffins and will be re-buried at Cornelian Bay Cemetery in early 2025.
- 19 December – Jaclyn Symes becomes the first female Treasurer of Victoria in a cabinet reshuffle following the departure of Tim Pallas.
- 20 December – Approximately 20 men gather on the steps of Parliament House in Melbourne and allegedly display an antisemitic banner which draws widespread condemnation.
- 27 December – The Victorian Liberal Party votes in the 2024 Victorian Liberal Party leadership spill. Brad Battin replaces John Pesutto as Liberal leader and leader of the opposition while Sam Groth is appointed deputy leader. Moira Deeming is readmitted to the parliamentary Liberal Party.

== Arts and entertainment ==
=== January ===
- 8 January – At the 81st Golden Globe Awards, Sarah Snook wins the Golden Globe Award for Best Actress – Television Series Drama and Elizabeth Debicki wins the Golden Globe Award for Best Supporting Actress – Series, Miniseries or Television Film.
- 14 January – At the 29th Critics' Choice Awards, Sarah Snook wins the Critics' Choice Television Award for Best Actress in a Drama Series and Elizabeth Debicki wins the Critics' Choice Television Award for Best Supporting Actress in a Drama Series.
- 15 January – At the 75th Primetime Emmy Awards, Sarah Snook wins the Primetime Emmy Award for Outstanding Lead Actress in a Drama Series and Elizabeth Debicki wins the Primetime Emmy Award for Outstanding Supporting Actress in a Drama Series.
- 27 January –
  - American rapper Doja Cat wins the annual Triple J Hottest 100 countdown with her song "Paint the Town Red".
  - The Country Music Awards of Australia are held in Tamworth where The Wolfe Brothers win the Golden Guitar for Album of the Year for Livin' The Dream, while Felicity Urquhart and Josh Cunningham win Golden Guitars for Song of the Year and Single of the Year for their song "Size Up".

=== February ===
- 1 February – Grace Yee wins the Victorian Prize for Literature at the 2024 Victorian Premier's Literary Awards.
- 4 February – Kylie Minogue wins the Grammy Award for Best Pop Dance Recording at the 66th Annual Grammy Awards for "Padam Padam".
- 9 February – Pink commences the Australian leg of her Summer Carnival tour at the Sydney Football Stadium, ahead of her concerts in Newcastle, Brisbane, Gold Coast, Melbourne, Adelaide and Perth.
- 10 February – The 13th AACTA Awards are held on the Gold Coast. Talk to Me wins Best Film, with Aswan Reid and Sophie Wilde winning Best Lead Actor and Best Lead Actress respectively. The Newsreader wins Best Television Drama with Hugo Weaving and Anna Torv winning Best Lead Actor and Best Lead Actress in a Television Drama Series respectively. Margot Robbie receives the Trailblazer Award.
- 14 February –
  - Peter Helliar and Emma Watkins are crowned this year's monarchs of Melbourne's Moomba Festival.
  - Regional music festival Groovin' the Moo is cancelled due to poor ticket sales.
- 16 February – Taylor Swift commences the Australian leg of The Eras Tour with three concerts at the Melbourne Cricket Ground ahead of her four shows at Stadium Australia in Sydney.
- 24 February – Elizabeth Debicki wins the Screen Actors Guild Award for Outstanding Performance by a Female Actor in a Drama Series at the 30th Screen Actors Guild Awards.

=== March ===
- 6 March – It's announced Electric Fields will represent Australia at the 2024 Eurovision Song Contest in Sweden with their song "One Milkali (One Blood)".
- 9 March – Due to extreme heat, the 2024 Moomba Parade in Melbourne (scheduled for 11 March) is cancelled.
- 12 March – Kylie Minogue and Arcade Fire are announced as the headliners at this year's Splendour in the Grass music festival near the Byron Bay.
- 15 March – John Ferguson from The Australian wins the Gold Quill at the Quill Awards for his story about the 2023 Leongatha mushroom murders.
- 21 March – Veteran ABC broadcaster James Valentine announces he has been diagnosed with oesophageal cancer and will undergo surgery to remove his oesophagus. He is to be temporarily replaced on ABC Radio Sydney's Afternoons program by Tim Webster.
- 25 March – Despite having announced the line-up of artists two weeks prior, organisers of the Splendour in the Grass music festival near Byron Bay suddenly announce the cancellation of the festival for 2024 due to unexpected events.

=== April ===
- 14 April – Sarah Snook wins the Laurence Olivier Award for Best Actress at the 2024 Laurence Olivier Awards.
- 17 April – The annual Queensland Music Awards are held in Brisbane. Jem Cassar-Daley wins Song of the Year with "King of Disappointment", Cub Sport wins Album of the Year for Jesus at the Gay Bar and James Blundell is recognised with the Grant McLennan Lifetime Achievement Award.
- 20 April – During his performance at the Melbourne International Comedy Festival, comedian Arj Barker asks a breastfeeding mother in the audience to leave, claiming her seven-month-old baby was disrupting his show. The incident prompts much discussion and public debate.
- 21 April – Archie Moore wins the Golden Lion award at the 2024 Venice Biennale for his installation "kith and kin", Australia's representative exhibition which was housed in the Australian pavilion.
- 27 April – Nicole Kidman is awarded the AFI Life Achievement Award.
- 29 April –
  - Peter van Onselen joins Daily Mail Australia as its political editor.
  - The Australian Broadcasting Corporation's national sports reporter David Mark is recognised at the International Sports Press Association's Sports Media Awards in Spain for his exposé into rock climbing coach Stephen Mitchell who was convicted in 2023 of sexually assaulting six young girls between 1994 and 2008.

=== May ===
- 1 May – Troye Sivan's "Rush" wins Song of the Year at the APRA Music Awards of 2024 in Sydney.
- 2 May –
  - Alexis Wright becomes the first person to win the Stella Prize twice, when she wins the 2024 Stella Prize for her novel Praiseworthy.
  - Furiosa: A Mad Max Saga premieres in Sydney.
- 6 May – ABC Radio Sydney officially commences broadcasting from the ABC's new broadcasting facility at 6 & 8 Parramatta Square in Parramatta, with Mornings hosted by Sarah Macdonald becoming the first program to air from the site. The facility was officially opened by ABC chair Kim Williams, ABC managing director David Anderson and Member for Parramatta Andrew Charlton.
- 8 May – Australia's entry in the Eurovision Song Contest, Electric Fields are knocked out in the first semi-final.
- 12 May – Following Macklemore's performance in Sydney of his pro-Palestine university protests song "Hind's Hall", co-chief executive officer of the Executive Council of Australian Jewry, Alexander Ryvchin describes the song as "hateful" and says it "whitewashes the racism (and) violence... that has come out of the (university) encampments."
- 15 May – It's revealed that the National Gallery of Australia received more than a dozen complaints from associates of Gina Rinehart's company Hancock Prospecting demanding the gallery remove a portrait of Rinehart from Vincent Namatjira's exhibition "Australia in Colour". The demand to have the portrait removed attracts international attention. Swimming Queensland also reveal they had also written a letter requesting the portrait be removed after swimmer Kyle Chalmers asked for help in trying to get the portrait removed on behalf of his fellow swimmers.
- 20 May – Kylie Kwong announces she is ending her 30-year career as a professional chef.
- 23 May – Chris Hemsworth is honoured with a star on the Hollywood Walk of Fame.
- 24 May – It's announced the host of Radio National's Late Night Live program Phillip Adams is to retire with his final show scheduled to air on 27 June. His successor is announced as David Marr who will take over hosting the program from 15 July.
- 29 May – News Corp Australia commences a corporate restructure which sees senior roles including news.com.au editor-in-chief Lisa Muxworthy and group director of the Editorial Innovation Centre John McGourty become redundant.
- 30 May – The Archibald Packing Room Prize is won by Matt Adnate for his portrait of Baker Boy.
- 31 May – ABC journalists Jessica Moran and Chris Rowbottom are named joint winners of the Journalist of the Year Award at the 2024 Tasmania Media Awards, in recognition of their investigate reporting into Tasmania's harness racing industry.

=== June ===
- 3 June – The Fair Work Commission finds that journalist Antoinette Lattouf was sacked by the Australian Broadcasting Corporation when she was taken off air while she was a fill-in host on ABC Radio Sydney's Mornings program in December 2023. The Fair Work Commission rejected the ABC's claim that Lattouf wasn't sacked as she had been paid for the full week.
- 7 June –
  - Laura Jones wins the 2024 Archibald Prize for her portrait of Tim Winton, while Naomi Kantjuriny wins the Sulman Prize for Minyma mamu tjuta and Djakaŋu Yunupiŋu wins the Wynne Prize for Nyalala gurmilili.
  - The Australian, The Daily Telegraph and Sky News Australia issue public apologies to Miriki Performing Arts, Aboriginal and Torres Strait Islander child dancers and Aboriginal elder David Mundraby after a 2019 photo of Indigenous children performing at the Cairns Children's Festival was used without permission in an unrelated story about child sexual abuse on 17 October 2023.
- 8 June – Attendees of Vivid Sydney's Love is in the Air drone show claim they felt trapped after a larger than expected amount of spectators gathered at Circular Quay to watch.
- 12 June – It's reported News Corp Australia will be making up to 40% of its sales staff redundant amidst a corporate restructure of the company.
- 15 June – American comedian Jerry Seinfeld commences a national tour, with the first of his seven Australian stand up shows held in Perth. At some of his Australian shows, Seinfeld encounters pro-Palestine protestors.
- 16 June – Through his lawyers, Robert Irwin threatens production company StepMates Studios with legal action if a two-minute cartoon they produced for Pauline Hanson's One Nation's YouTube Channel is not taken down. Depicting Irwin guiding Bluey on a mock tour of Queensland, Irwin's lawyers claim the cartoon is defamatory and features the unauthorised and deceptive use of Irwin's image. However, Pauline Hanson defends the cartoon and indicates that it won't be taken down.

=== July ===
- 4 July – It's announced Marty Sheargold is leaving Triple M Melbourne's breakfast program.
- 6 July – The South Australian Media Awards are held in Adelaide where SBS journalist Peta Doherty is named Journalist of the Year in recognition of her multi-platform story about a housing development in Adelaide being built on a mass burial site.
- 8 July – Nine Entertainment announces a sub-licensing agreement will allows the ABC to broadcast the 2024 Summer Olympics on all ABC Local Radio stations across Australia, with the exception of its stations in Sydney, Melbourne and Brisbane.
- 10 July – After being contacted by the family of Pablo Picasso who challenge the authenticity of Picasso artworks in Tasmania's Museum of Old and New Art, founder Kirsha Kaechele admits to forging three Picasso artworks which had been displayed in the museum for more than three years. The family of Picasso decide not to action against MONA, conceding: "the urgency of creation sometimes makes us forget that there are principles of law protecting the interests of authors".
- 14 July – During their concert at the International Convention Centre in Sydney, Tenacious D's Kyle Gass makes a joke about the attempted assassination of Donald Trump. The jokes brings swift condemnation and prompts frontman Jack Black to announce on 16 July that the remainder of their Australian tour had been cancelled, stating that he had been "blindsided" and that he would "never condone hate speech or encourage political violence in any form."
- 25 July – Media, Entertainment and Arts Alliance members employed by Nine Publishing at mastheads the Sydney Morning Herald, The Age, Australian Financial Review, Brisbane Times and WAtoday vote to reject a revised bargaining offer from management and announce they that will walk off the job at 11am on 26 July.

=== August ===
- 1 August – Alexis Wright wins the 2024 Miles Franklin Award for her novel Praiseworthy, becoming the first person to win both the Stella Prize and Miles Franklin Awards in the same year.
- 7 August – Dave Hughes, Ed Kavalee and Erin Molan announce that 2Day FM's breakfast program Hughesy, Ed & Erin breakfast program has finished, citing family commitments.
- 8 August – The 2024 Archibald Prize's People's Choice Award is won by Angus McDonald for his portrait of Marcia Langton.
- 11 August – Pianist Jayson Gillham premieres a five-minute piece called "Witness" written by Connor D'Netto but his comments about Palestinian journalists being killed in Gaza prompts the Melbourne Symphony Orchestra to denounce Gillham and issue an apology, stating that it does not condone the expression of political statements on stage.
- 14-15 August – Female and male staff members of Sydney radio station KIIS 106.5 are asked to record themselves urinating for a guessing game on The Kyle and Jackie O Show which leads to criticism of the show, its hosts and Australian Radio Network management particularly in Melbourne where the program is rating poorly after it replaced a local breakfast show on KIIS 101.1.
- 15 August –
  - It's announced Missy Higgins will be inducted into the ARIA Hall of Fame at the annual ARIA Music Awards in November. However, music journalist Bernard Zuel lambasts the decision, describing it as "ridiculous" and a "comical misjudgment", urging the Australian Record Industry Association to "stop pissing about" due to his view that Higgins and fellow Hall of Famers Kasey Chambers and Jet are "maybe midway through their careers" and that after only 20 years their careers are "nowhere near completed."
  - The Melbourne Symphony Orchestra concedes it made an error by cancelleing an upcoming performance by pianist Jayson Gillham after he made comments about journalists in Gaza, but maintains their concerts are not an appropriate place to express political views.
- 16 August – The Australian Broadcasting Corporation's global affairs editor John Lyons is named "Journalist of the Year" at the Kennedy Awards, in recognition of his work reporting from the Middle East since the 2023 Hamas-led attack on Israel.
- 22 August – The Australian Broadcasting Corporation's managing director David Anderson tenders his resignation just a year into his second five-year term, but will remain in the role until early 2025.

=== September ===
- 2 September – Model and actress Elle MacPherson reveals that after being diagnosed with breast cancer in 2017, she refused chemotherapy and opted for "an intuitive, heart-led, holistic approach". Her comments draw widespread condemnation.
- 6-15 September - SWELL Sculpture Festival is held at Currumbin Beach, Queensland.
- 8 September – Nicole Kidman is awarded the Volpi Cup for Best Actress at the 81st Venice International Film Festival but leaves Venice before accepting the award upon learning her mother Janelle Kidman had died.
- 15 September – Elizabeth Debicki wins the Primetime Emmy Award for Outstanding Supporting Actress in a Drama Series at the 76th Primetime Emmy Awards.
- 20 September – The Australian Broadcasting Corporation's managing director David Anderson orders an independent review into how audio featured in a September 2022 online article and 7.30 story came to be "incorrectly edited", after the Seven Network airs allegations claiming the ABC added additional gunshots to incorrectly illustrate former special forces major Heston Russell had committed war crimes. In 2023, Russell won a defamation case against the ABC which was ordered to pay Russell $390,000 after they failed to prove its reporting was in the public interest.
- 27 September –
  - A tribunal decision which would have allowed men to enter a space designated as "women only" at the Museum of Old and New Art in Hobart is quashed and sent back to the tribunal for consideration. The decision comes after a New South Wales man originally won the anti-discrimination case against MONA in March after having been denied entry to the women's only "Ladies Lounge" area.
  - As the station prepares to "take a new direction", Laurel Edwards, Gary Clare and Mark Hine sign off from 4BC's breakfast program in Brisbane for the final time, two years after they moved to the station upon the closure of 4KQ.

=== October ===
- 1 October – A review finds overwhelming evidence of systemic racism at the Australian Broadcasting Corporation. The review made 15 recommendations to improve the ABC's staff who have a diverse culture.
- 8 October –
  - RN Breakfast host Patricia Karvelas issues an on air apology following an interview in which she and her guest Geneva Call's Director-General Alain Délétroz both used the term "schizophrenic" when describing policy.
  - John Laws announces he will retire from radio on 8 November 2024 after a 70-year radio career. It's the second time Laws has announced his retirement during his career after leaving 2UE in 2007 before returning to radio in 2011 at 2SM where he has hosted the John Laws Morning Show ever since.
- 9 October – It's announced Patricia Karvelas will be leaving her role as host of RN Breakfast on Radio National to take on additional duties at the ABC including a "key anchoring role" on the ABC News channel.
- 10 October – After being arrested in Brisbane and extradited back to Western Australia, 29-year-old UK rapper and YouTuber Yung Filly appears in Perth Magistrates Court charged with raping and choking a woman in a Perth hotel on 28 September. He is granted bail with strict conditions including a ban on contacting the alleged victim or posting about the case on social media. He is also ordered to stay in Western Australia, post a $100,000 surety and report daily to police.
- 11 October – After 26 years as ABC Radio Sydney's drive presenter, Richard Glover announces he will be leaving the role with his final program scheduled for 29 November.
- 12 October –
  - The 2024 Australian Commercial Radio Awards are held in Sydney where 101.7 WSFM's Jonesy & Amanda win the ACRA for Best On Air Team (Metro), 2GB's Ben Fordham wins the ACRA for Individual Talent of the Year (Metro) and KIIS Network's Kyle & Jackie O's Hour of Power wins the ACRA for Best Networked Show. Bob Rogers is posthumously inducted into the Hall of Fame.
  - Freelance journalists Kylie Stevenson, Caroline Graham and Matilda Colling are awarded the NT Journalist of the Year award at the 2024 MEAA NT Media Awards for their series "NT Schools in Crisis" which was published in The Australian and The Weekend Australian.
- 14 October – American performer Olivia Rodrigo falls through a hole in the stage while performing at Rod Laver Arena in Melbourne.
- 18 October - 4 November – Sculpture by the Sea exhibition is held at Bondi Beach, Sydney.
- 24 October – Ouroboros sculpture by Lindy Lee unveiled at the National Gallery of Australia in Canberra.
- 30 October – Coldplay perform without bassist Guy Berryman for the first time in their career after he was taken ill.

=== November ===
- 1 November – Sally Sara is named as the new host of RN Breakfast on Radio National, succeeding Patricia Karvelas from 20 January 2025. The new program will also have a new start time of 5:30am in 2025.
- 3 November – Coldplay frontman Chris Martin falls through a hole in the stage while performing at Marvel Stadium in Melbourne.
- 7 November – Talkback radio host Ray Hadley announces his retirement from radio, with his final program scheduled to air on 13 December 2024.
- 8 November –
  - Talkback radio host John Laws signs off for the final time, after a 71-year career in radio.
  - Sean Fewster, Gemma Jones and Kathryn Bermingham from News Corp are awarded Best News Report in Print or Digital at the 2024 SA Press Club Awards for their story "On The Nose - David Speirs Video".
- 10 November – English celebrity chef Jamie Oliver issues a second apology and orders his new children's book Billy and the Epic Escape to be removed from bookstores after Indigenous Australians condemn the book and describe it as "offensive" and "harmful". Penguin Random House UK also apologises and claims that Oliver had requested that Indigenous Australians be consulted about the content of the book, but it hadn't occurred due to "editorial oversight".
- 19 November – The 69th Walkley Awards are held where the Gold Walkley is awarded to Nine Entertainment's "Building Bad" investigation team of Nick McKenzie (The Age, Sydney Morning Herald and 60 Minutes), David Marin-Guzman (Australian Financial Review), Ben Schneiders (The Age), Garry McNab (60 Minutes), Amelia Ballinger (60 Minutes) and Reid Butler (Nine News). The team were recognised for their work exposing widespread allegations of corruption and intimidation at the Construction, Forestry and Maritime Employees Union.
- 20 November – The 2024 ARIA Music Awards are held where Troye Sivan wins awards for Album of the Year, Best Pop Release and Best Solo Artist for Something to Give Each Other, Royel Otis wins the awards for Best Group and Best Rock Album for Pratts & Pain, Teen Jesus and the Jean Teasers wins the Michael Gudinski ARIA for Breakthrough Artist for I Love You and Troy Cassar-Daley wins the ARIA Award for Best Country Album for Between the Fires.
- 21 November - Two Australian tourists, Bianca Jones (19) and Holly Bowles (19), were among those reported to have died from a methanol poisoning in Laos.
- 22 November – The Australian Broadcasting Corporation announces multiple changes to presenting line-ups on its metropolitan radio stations in 2025. Among the notable changes, Chris Bath will host Drive on ABC Radio Sydney with Charlie Pickering hosting Thank God It's Friday. The network's decision to dump Sarah MacDonald as the station's Mornings host is met with widespread criticism. Bob Murphy and Sharnelle Vella will host Breakfast on ABC Radio Melbourne, succeeding Sammy J while Kelly Higgins-Devine will return to ABC Radio Brisbane's Evenings program with Ellen Fanning hosting the station's Drive program.
- 30 November – The Queensland Media Awards are held at the Brisbane Convention & Exhibition Centre. A Current Affair reporters Dan Nolan and Ben Stivala are named joint Journalists of the Year for their reporting on childcare whistleblower Yolanda Borucki and the failures in the investigation of child abuser Ashley Paul Griffith.

=== December ===
- 8 December – Raygun: The Musical created by comedian Steph Broadbridge and inspired by Olympic breaker Rachael Gunn is cancelled ahead of its Sydney premiere on 14 December after Broadbridge receives correspondence from Gunn's lawyers threatening legal action if she continues with the show. Gunn and her management team both defend the action and claim they took steps to shut down the musical to protect Gunn's personal and professional relationships fearing that people may mistakenly assume they were affiliated with the production. The musical's cancellation attracts international media attention.
- 10 December – The 2024 additions to the NSFA's Sounds of Australia registry are announced. They are: Jessie Street's 1945 address to the first meeting of the Women's International Radio League on women's status in the United Nations Charter; the speaking clock voiced by Gordon Gow in 1954; the 1963 Doctor Who theme composed by Ron Grainer and Delia Derbyshire; the Victoria Bitter advertisement voiced by John Meillon in 1968, the Jimmie Barker Collections from 1972, the earliest 2EA broadcasts in language from 1975, 1992's Kickin' to the Undersound by Sound Unlimited, Tina Arena's 1994 hit "Chains", the last call of the Christmas Island pipistrelle from 2009 and Nova Peris' 2013 maiden speech to Federal Parliament.
- 11 December - Tasmania's Museum of Old and New Art announces the controversial "Ladies Lounge" exhibit will reopen for a "victory lap" from 19 December 2024 until 13 January 2025 following their legal win regarding a discrimination complaint.
- 17 December - Former Nine Entertainment CEO Hugh Marks is announced as the incoming managing director of the Australian Broadcasting Corporation and is expected to officially take on the role in March 2025, succeeding David Anderson.
- List of Australian submissions for the Academy Award for Best International Feature Film
- List of Australian films of 2024
- List of 2024 box office number-one films in Australia

== Deaths ==
=== January ===
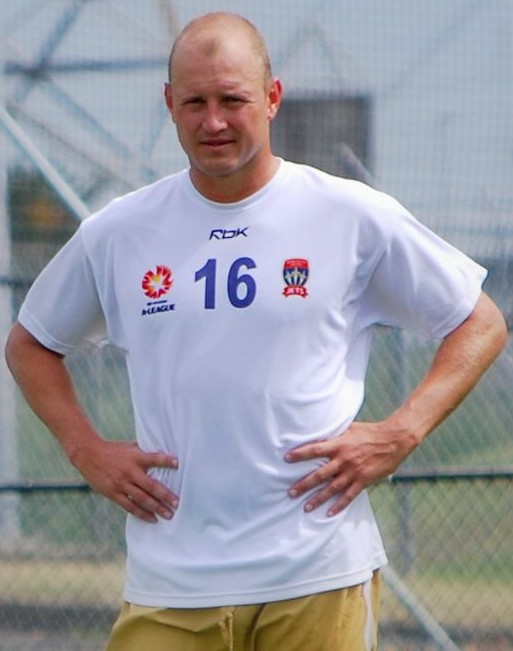
Stephen Laybutt

- 3 January – Lillian Crombie, actress (The Place at the Coast, Deadly, Jindalee Lady) and dancer (b. 1958)
- 11 January – Mike Taylor, record company executive (Universal Music Australia) (b. 1967)
- 12 January – David Lumsdaine, composer (b. 1931)
- 13 January – Stephen Laybutt, footballer (Gent, Newcastle Jets, national team) (b. 1977)
- 14 January –
  - John Bingley, Australian rules football player (b. 1941)
  - Joan Coxsedge, politician and activist (b. 1931)
- 17 January – Anthony Gobert, motorcycle road racer (b. 1975)
- 18 January – Ted Allsopp, racewalker (b. 1926)
- 19 January – Raymond Apple, rabbi (b. 1935)
- 21 January –
  - Roger Rogerson, police officer and convicted murderer (b. 1941)
  - Dick O'Bree, Australian rules footballer (b. 1936)
- 22 January – John McMahon, cricketer (b. 1932)
- 24 January – Troy Beckwith, actor (b. 1975 or 1976)
- 27 January – Sylvia Walton, academic (b. 1941)
- 31 January – Michael Egan, politician (b. 1948)

=== February ===
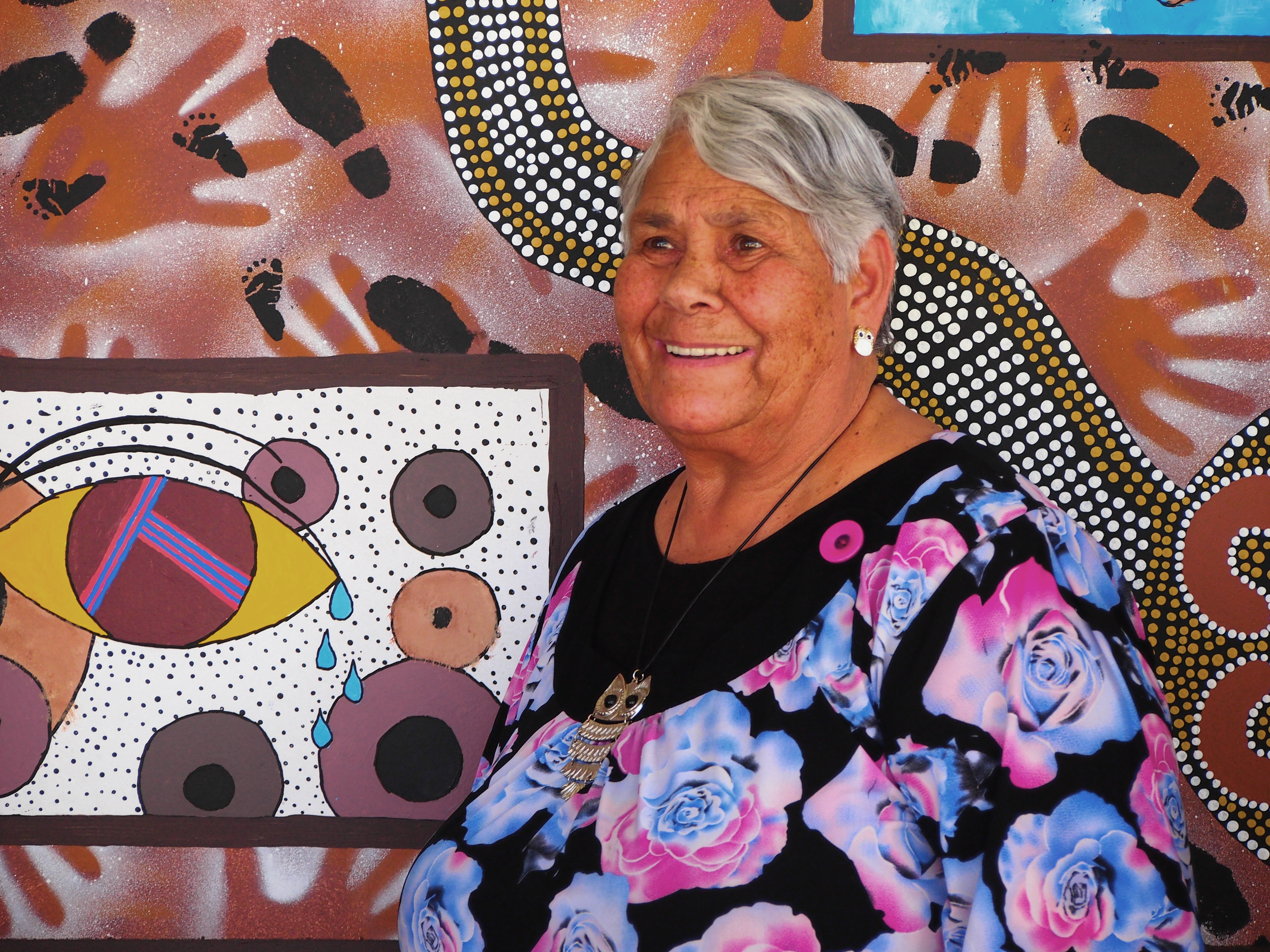
Lowitja O'Donoghue

- 1 February – Garth Manton, rower (b. 1929)
- 2 February – Gregory Charles Rivers, actor (b. 1965) (died in China)
- 4 February –
  - Lowitja O'Donoghue, public administrator and activist (b. 1932)
  - Andrew Rogers – judge (b. 1933)
- 5 February –
  - Joan Montgomery, teacher (b. 1925)
  - Ernie O'Rourke, Australian rules footballer (b. 1926)
- 7 February – Lois Bryson, sociologist (b. 1937).
- 9 February – Frank Howson, theatre and film director (b. 1952)
- 10 February – Harold Mitchell, businessman (b. 1942)
- 17 February – Geoffrey Michaels, violinist (b. 1944) (died in the United States)
- 19 February –
  - Jesse Baird, television presenter and AFL goal umpire (b. c. 1998)
  - Marion Halligan, writer (b. 1940)
- 21 February – Jayo Archer, motocross rider (b. 1996)
- 27 February –
  - Darryl van de Velde, rugby league player, coach and administrator (b. 1951)
  - John Flynn, politician (b. 1953)
- 29 February – Linda White, politician

=== March ===
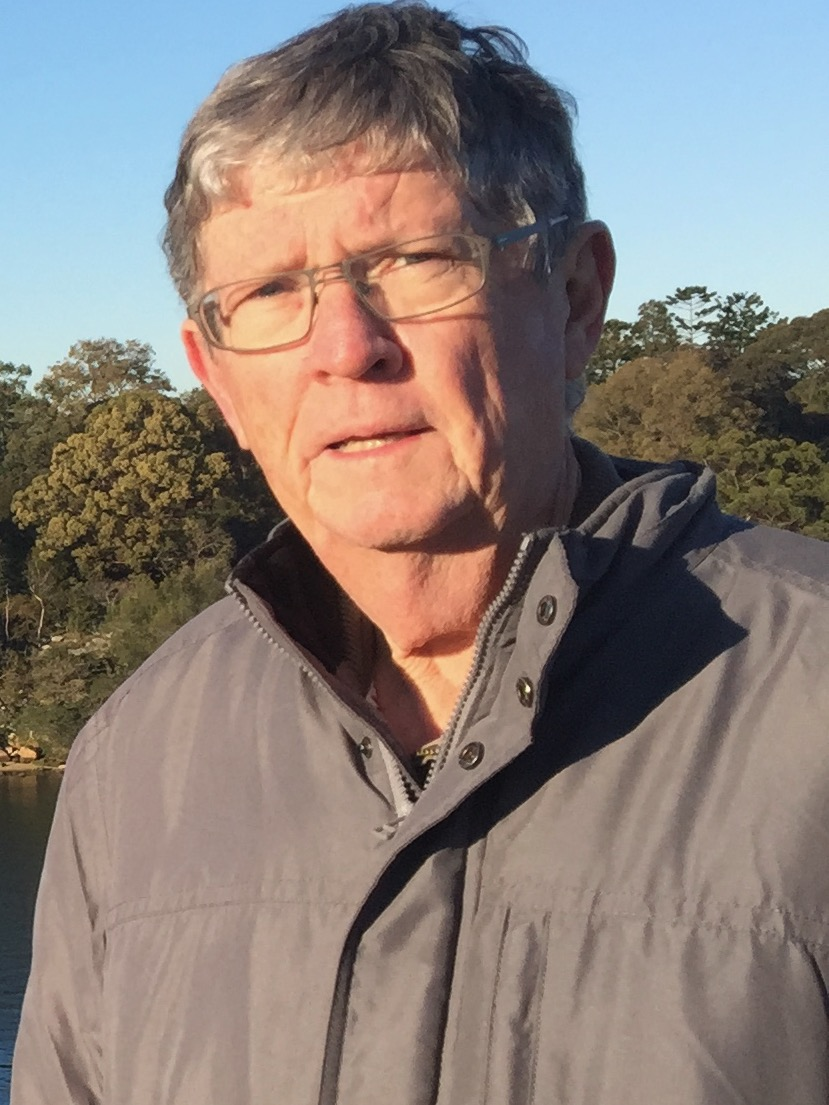
Ian Heads

- 4 March – Michael Jenkins, writer, producer and director (b. 1946)
- 5 March –
  - Guy Griffiths, naval officer (b. 1923)
  - Steve Marsh, Australian rules footballer (b. 1924)
- 7 March – David Granger, Australian rules footballer (b. 1955)
- 10 March – Steve Maxwell, footballer (b. 1965)
- 11 March – Mike McColl-Jones, comedy writer (b. 1937)
- 14 March –
  - Grant Page, stuntman (b. 1939)
  - Francis Carroll, archbishop (b. 1930)
  - Tom Gilmore Jr., politician (b. 1946)
- 24 March – Andrew Plympton, Australian rules football administrator (b. 1949)
- 25 March – Ian Heads, rugby league journalist and historian (b. 1943)
- 30 March – Les Twentyman, youth outreach worker (b. 1948)
- 31 March –
  - Michael McMartin, music manager (b. 1945)
  - John Turtle, academic and endocrinologist (b. 1937)

=== April ===
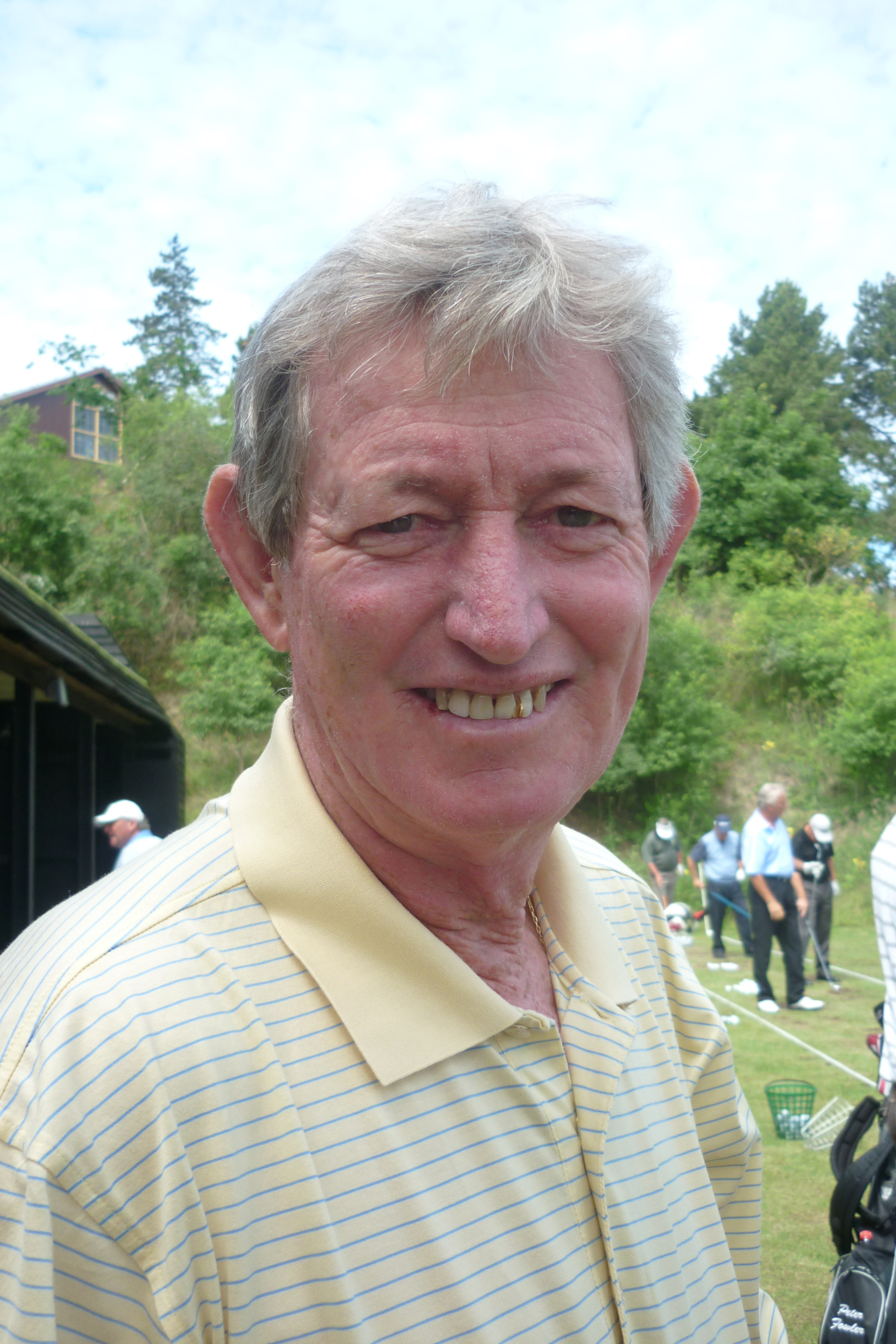
Noel Ratcliffe

- 3 April – Stefano Cherchi, Italian jockey (b. 2001)
- 4 April – Bob Lanigan, rugby league player (b. 1942 or 1943)
- 8 April –
  - Keith Barnes, rugby league player (b. 1934) (death announced on this date)
  - Ron Lord, soccer player (b. 1929)
- 9 April – Nathan Templeton, television journalist (b. 1979)
- 13 April – Ian Parmenter, chef and television presenter (b. 1945)
- 15 April – Noel Ratcliffe, golfer (b. 1945) (death announced on this date)
- 16 April –
  - Peter Davidson, Australian rules footballer (b. 1963)
  - Gavin Webb, musician (b. 1946)
- 17 April – Neil Rogers, swimmer (b. 1953) (death announced on this date)
- 22 April – Brian Tobin, tennis player and executive (b. 1930)
- 24 April – Terry Hill, rugby league player (b. 1972)
- 25 April –
  - John Mildren politician (b. 1932)
  - Ross Thornton, Australian rules footballer (b. 1956)
- 26 April –
  - Peter Ingham, Roman Catholic bishop (b. 1941)
  - Graham Webb, radio and television presenter (b. 1936)
- 30 April –
  - Adrian Horridge, neuroscientist (b. 1927)
  - Lyndall Ryan, historian (b. 1943)

=== May ===
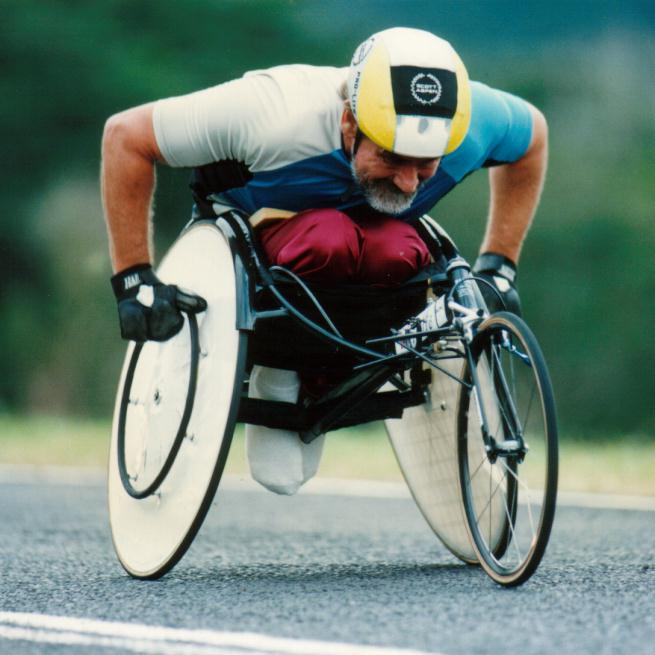
Mike Nugent

- 2 May – Ian Hayden, Australian rules footballer and barrister (b. 1941)
- 3 May – Tony Bleasdale, politician (b. 1946) (died on flight between China and Australia)
- 6 May –
  - Mike Nugent, Paralympic athlete (b. 1946)
  - Johnny Walker, racing car driver (b. 1944)
  - Brian Wenzel, actor (b. 1929) (death announced on this date)
- 7 May – Ignatius Jones, singer and producer (b. 1957) (born and died in the Philippines)

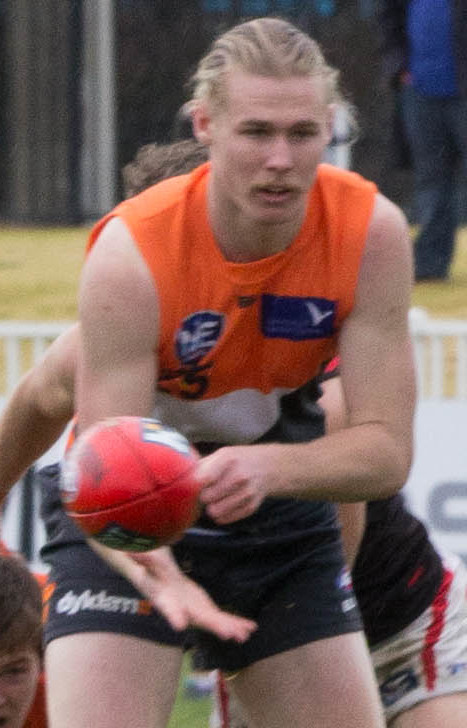
Cam McCarthy

- 9 May – Cam McCarthy, Australian rules footballer (Greater Western Sydney, Fremantle) (b. 1995)
- 10 May – Patrick Nilan, field hockey player (b. 1941)
- 12 May –
  - Hugh Edwards, journalist (b. 1933)
  - Ron Lynch, rugby league player (b. 1939)
- 13 May –
  - Berkley Cox, Australian rules footballer (b. 1934)
  - Reg Burgess, Australian rules footballer (b. 1934)
- 15 May – June Mendoza, painter (b. 1924)
- 18 May – Frank Ifield, yodeller and country music singer (b. 1937 in England)
- 20 May – Bill Serong, Australian rules footballer (b. 1936)
- 23 May –
  - Barry Davis, Australian rules footballer (b. 1943)
  - Rosemary Laing, photographer (b. 1959)
- 24 May – Destiny Deacon, artist (b. 1957) (death announced on this date)
- 29 May –
  - Steve Blyth, rugby league player (b. 1954) (death announced on this date)
  - Bob Rogers, radio disc jockey and broadcaster (b. 1926)

=== June ===
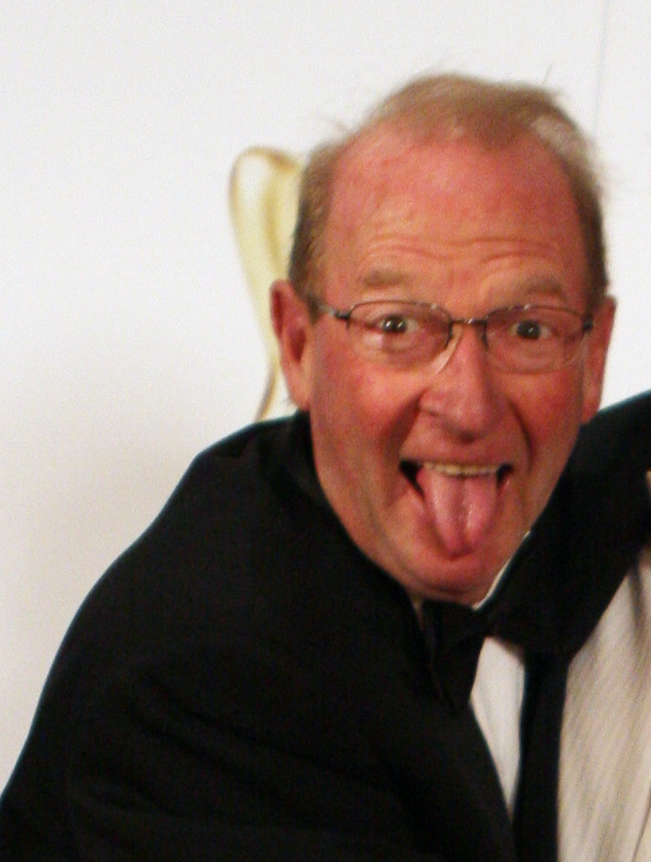
John Blackman

- 1 June –
  - Henry Gunstone, Australian rules footballer and cricketer (b. 1940)
  - Gary Nairn, politician (b. 1951)
- 2 June – Natasha Ryan, former suspected murder victim (b. 1984) (death announced on this date)
- 4 June –
  - John Blackman, radio and television presenter (b. 1947)
  - John Todd, Australian rules footballer (b. 1938) (death announced on this date)
- 5 June – Ross Booth, Australian rules footballer and commentator (b. 1951 or 1952) (death announced on this date)
- 7 June –
  - Siri Kannangara, sports physician
  - Greg Quicke, astronomer (b. 1961) (death announced on this date)
- 10 June –
  - Jennifer Cashmore, politician (b. 1937)
  - Steele Hall, politician (b. 1928)
- 11 June –
  - Dianne Burge, sprinter (b. 1943)
  - Bill Nankivell, politician (b. 1923)
- 14 June – Guy Warren, artist (b. 1921)
- 17 June – Leon Berner, Australian rules footballer (b. 1935)
- 18 June – Alan Gold, author (b. 1945)
- 21 June – Fred Smith, Australian rules footballer (b. 1941)
- 22 June –
  - Malcolm George Baker, convicted mass murderer (b. 1947)
  - Paul Stein, judge and environmental law expert (b. 1939)
- 23 June – David Tunley, musicologist (b. 1930)
- 26 June –
  - Keith Bromage, Australian rules footballer (b. 1937)
  - Stefan Romaniw, activist (b. 1955) (died in Poland)
  - Judith Whelan, journalist and media executive (b. 1960)
- 27 June – Kym Allen Parsons, (b. c. 1951) convicted armed robber

=== July ===
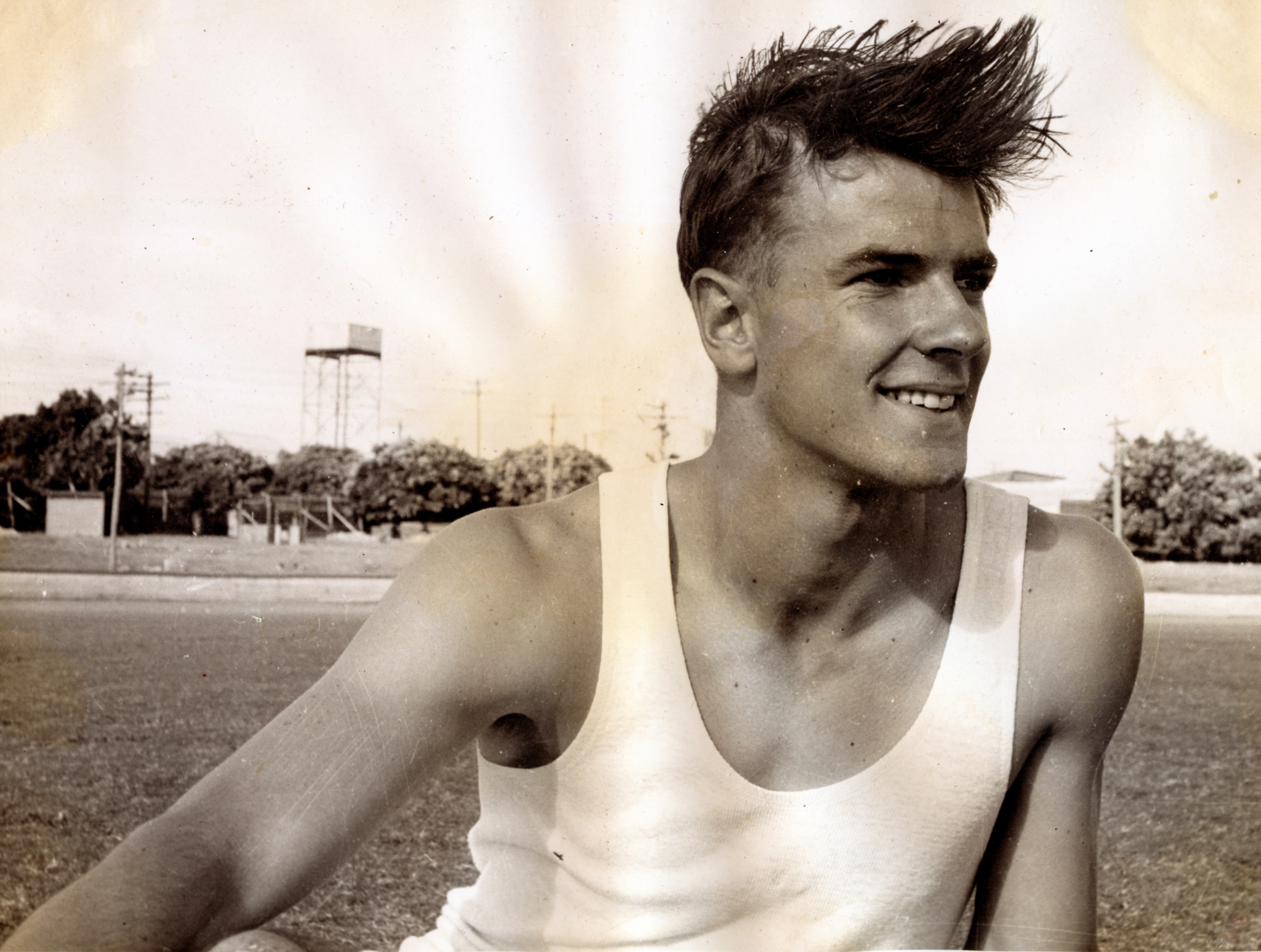
Kevan Gosper

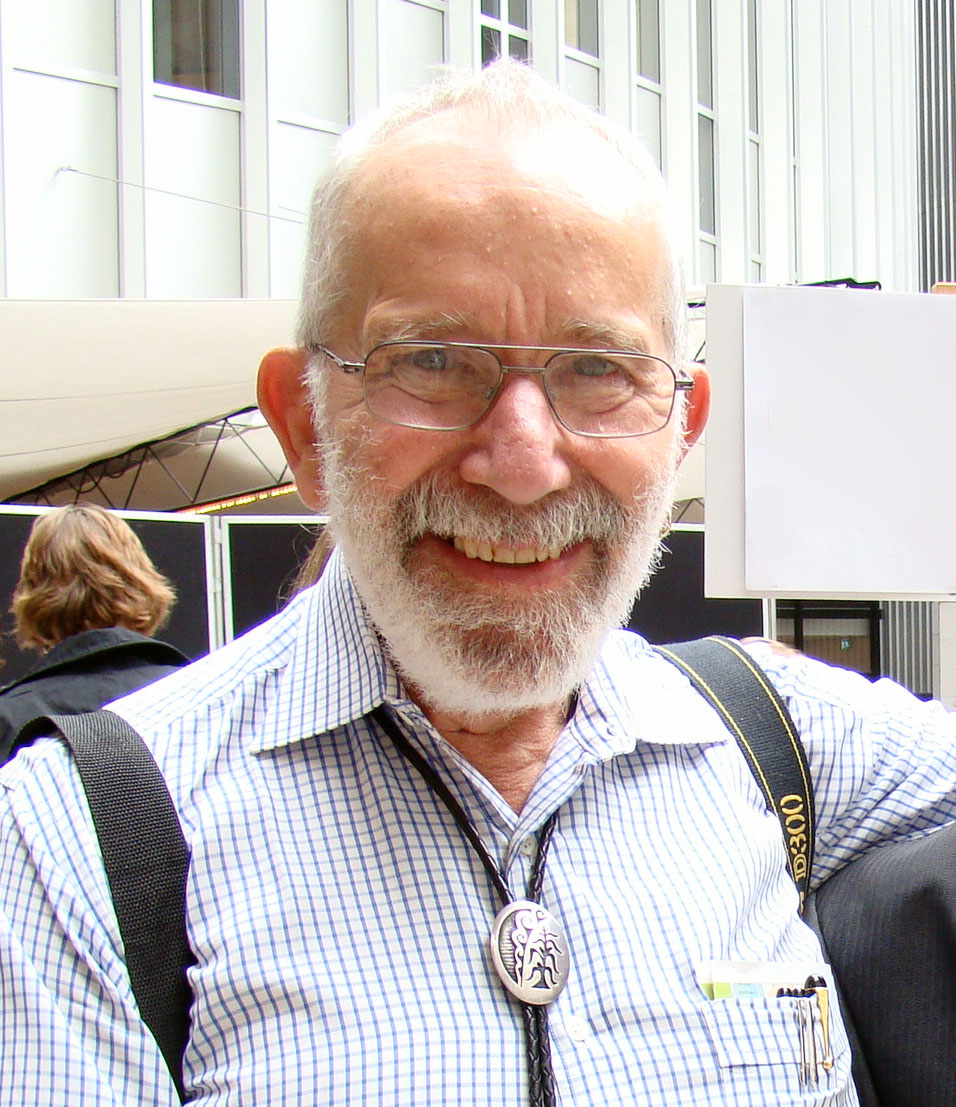
Robin Warren

- 1 July – Clyde Laidlaw, Australian rules footballer (b. 1933)
- 3 July – Geoff Robinson, rugby league player (b. 1957)
- 10 July –
  - Bob Banks, rugby league player (b. 1930)
  - Frank O'Neill, swimmer (b. 1926)
  - Peter Steedman, politician (b. 1943)
- 13 July – Ron E Sparks, radio presenter and voice over artist (b. 1952) (death announced on this date)
- 14 July – Roderick Carnegie, businessman (b. 1932)
- 15 July – Kevin Manning, Roman Catholic bishop (b. 1933)
- 17 July –
  - David Morrow, sports commentator (b. 1953) (death announced on this date)
  - Jim O'Sullivan, police commissioner (b. 1939)
- 19 July – Kevan Gosper, athlete, sports administrator and businessman (b. 1933) (death announced on this date)
- 23 July – Robin Warren, pathologist and Nobel laureate (2005) (b. 1937)
- 24 July – Ray Lawler, playwright (b. 1921)
- 25 July – Inga Peulich, politician (b. 1956)
- 26 July –
  - Janet Andrewartha, actress (Neighbours, Prisoner) (b. 1951)
  - John Conomos, artist and critic (b. 1947)
  - John Rickard, historian (b. 1935)
- 29 July – Paul Graham Wilson, botanist (b. 1928)

=== August ===
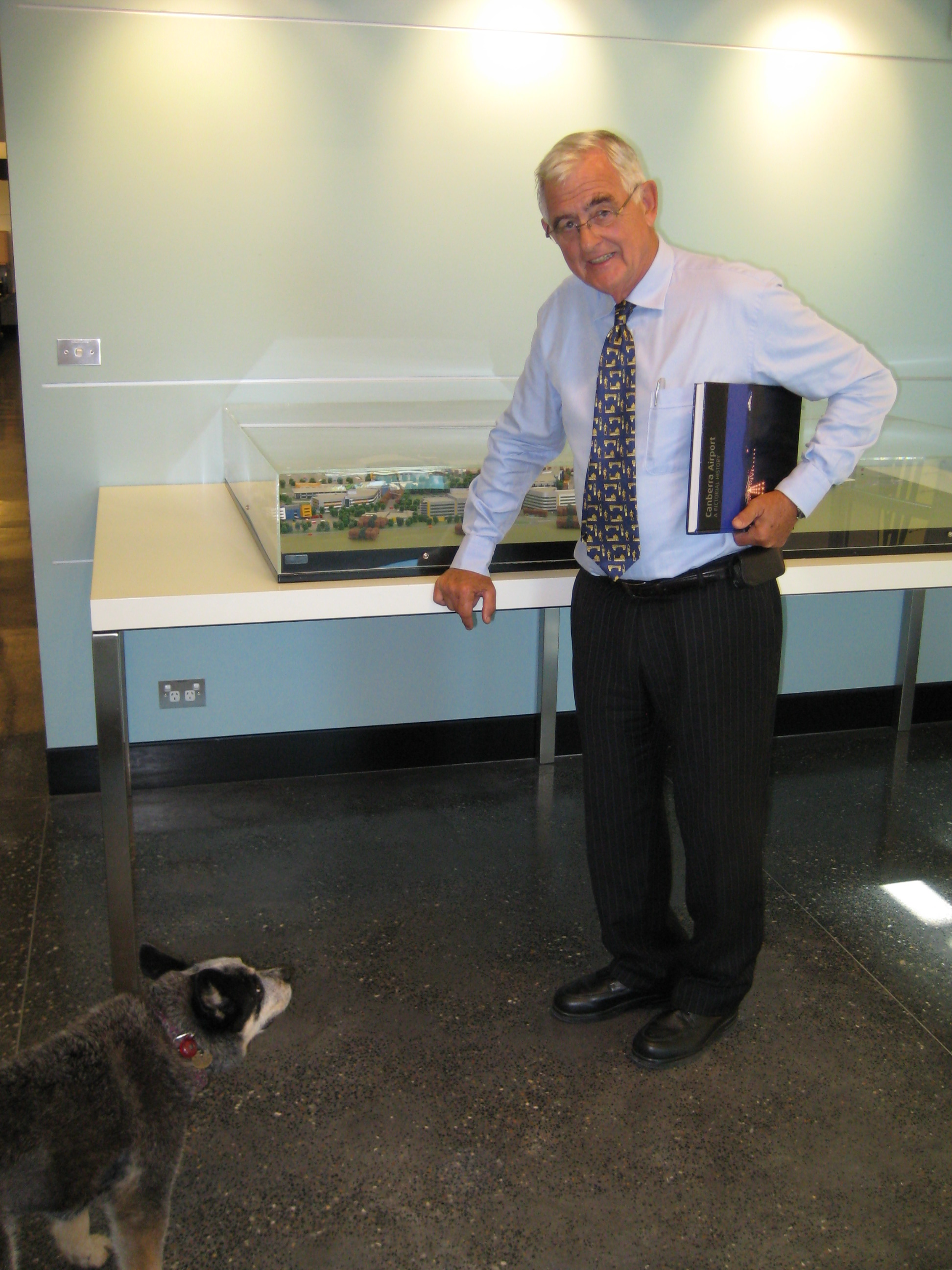
Terry Snow

- 3 August – Terry Snow, businessman and philanthropist (b. 1943)
- 5 August – Elliot McAdam, politician (b. 1951)
- 6 August – Jane Hansen, journalist and author
- 7 August – Jack Karlson, petty criminal and succulent Chinese meal consumer (b. 1942)
- 10 August – Steve Davislim, operatic tenor (b. 1967)
- 13 August – Sir Donald Trescowthick, businessman (b. 1930) (death announced on this date)
- 15 August – Olga Horak, author and Holocaust survivor (b. 1926) (death announced on this date)
- 16 August – Merle Thornton, feminist activist (b. 1930)
- 17 August – Black Caviar, racehorse (b. 2006)
- 20 August – Sam Landsberger, sports journalist (b. 1988)
- 22 August –
  - Gerald O'Collins, theologian (b. 1931)
  - Sphen, penguin (b. 2018)
- 25 August – John Bilbija, rugby league player (b. 1958/1959)
- 31 August – Jack Hibberd, playwright (b. 1940)

=== September ===
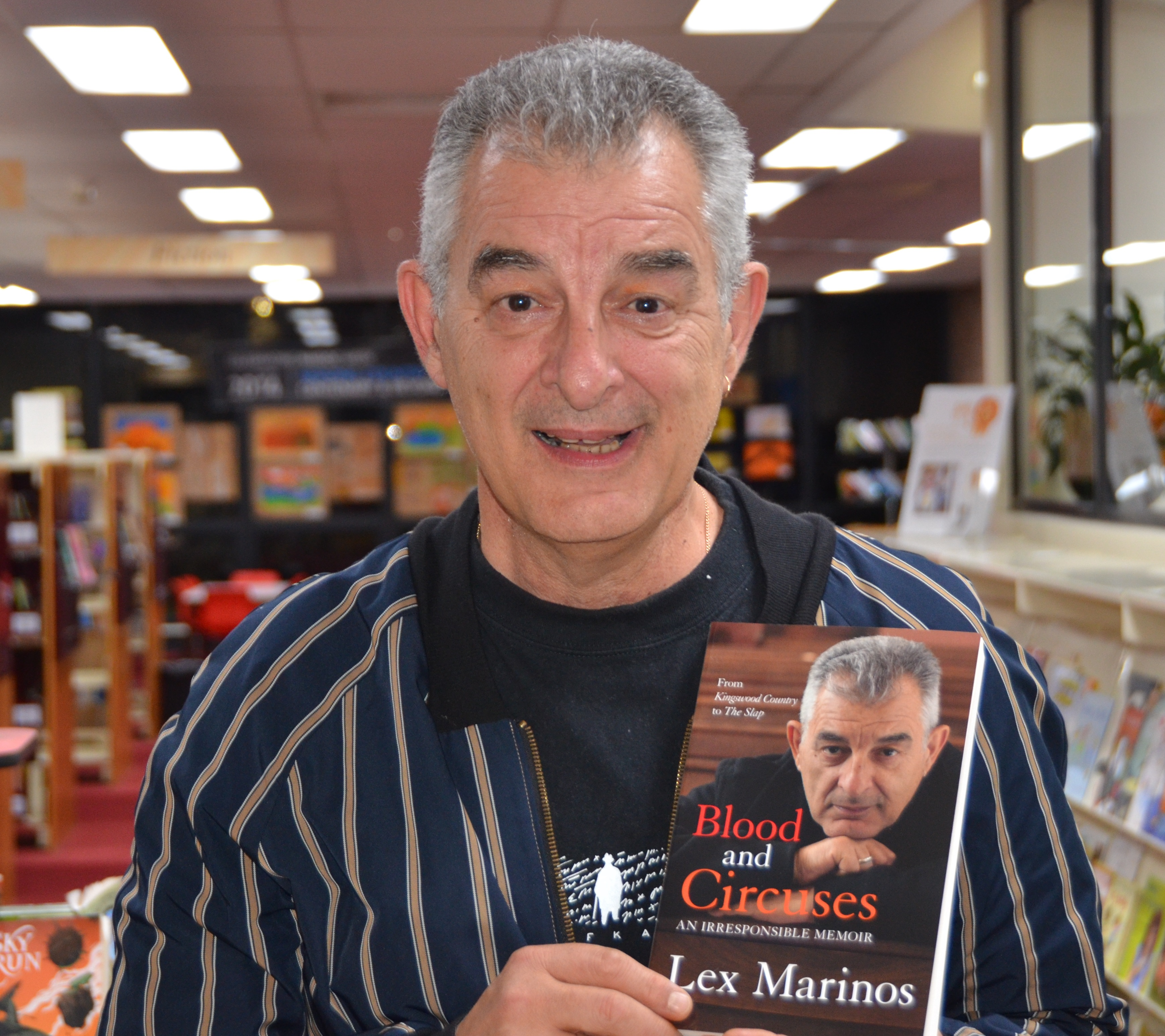
Lex Marinos

- 1 September –
  - Tim Bowden, historian and television presenter (b. 1937)
  - John Schultz, Australian rules footballer (b. 1938) (death announced on this date)
- 2 September – Maret Archer, actress (b. c. 1949)
- 3 September – Margaret Manion, art historian (b. 1935)
- 5 September – Marty Morton, actor
- 6 September –
  - Mark Moffatt, music producer and guitarist
  - Neil Inall, television and radio presenter (b. 1933)
- 7 September – Michael Guider, paedophile (b. 1950)
- 9 September –
  - Nick Dondas, politician (b. 1939) (death announced on this date)
  - Charlotte O'Brien, student
- 11 September – Frank Misson, cricketer (b. 1938)
- 12 September –
  - Graham McNeice, sports broadcaster and documentary filmmaker (b. 1948)
  - Aussie Malcolm, Australian-born New Zealand politician (b. 1940) (death announced on this date)
- 13 September – Lex Marinos, actor (b. 1949)
- 18 September –
  - Dick Diamonde, bass guitarist (The Easybeats) (b. 1947)
  - Zulya Kamalova, singer (b. 1969)
- 21 September – Greg Malouf, chef (b. 1960) (death announced on this date)
- 25 September – Dick Caine, Olympic swimming coach (b. 1946).

=== October ===
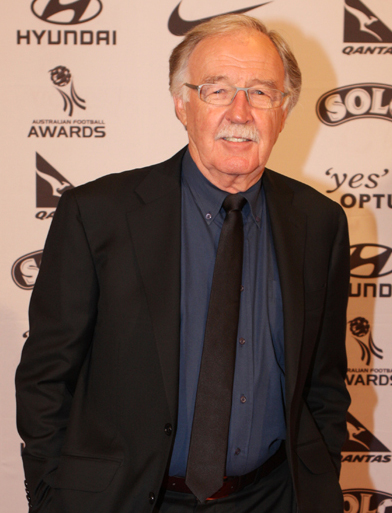
George Negus

- 3 October –
  - Jack Colwell, singer-songwriter (b. c. 1989)
  - Fiona MacDonald, television presenter (Wombat, It's a Knockout) (b. 1957)
- 4 October –
  - Barbara Blackman, writer (b. 1928)
  - John Lawrence O'Meally, judge (b. 1939)
  - Peter Cummins, actor (b. 1931)
- 8 October –
  - George Hampel, judge and barrister (b. 1933)
  - Joseph Haydar, weightlifter (b. 1938)
- 10 October – Sir Frank Moore, businessman and tourism advocate (b. 1930)
- 13 October – Elizabeth Hanan, Australian-born NZ politician (b. 1937)
- 15 October –
  - George Negus, journalist and television presenter (60 Minutes) (b. 1942)
  - Ollie Olsen, electronic musician, composer and sound designer (b. 1958)
- 27 October – Hugh Mitchell, Australian rules footballer (b. 1934)
- 29 October – Alan Lynch, Australian rules footballer (b. 1954)
- 30 October – Matt Peacock, journalist (b. 1952)

=== November ===
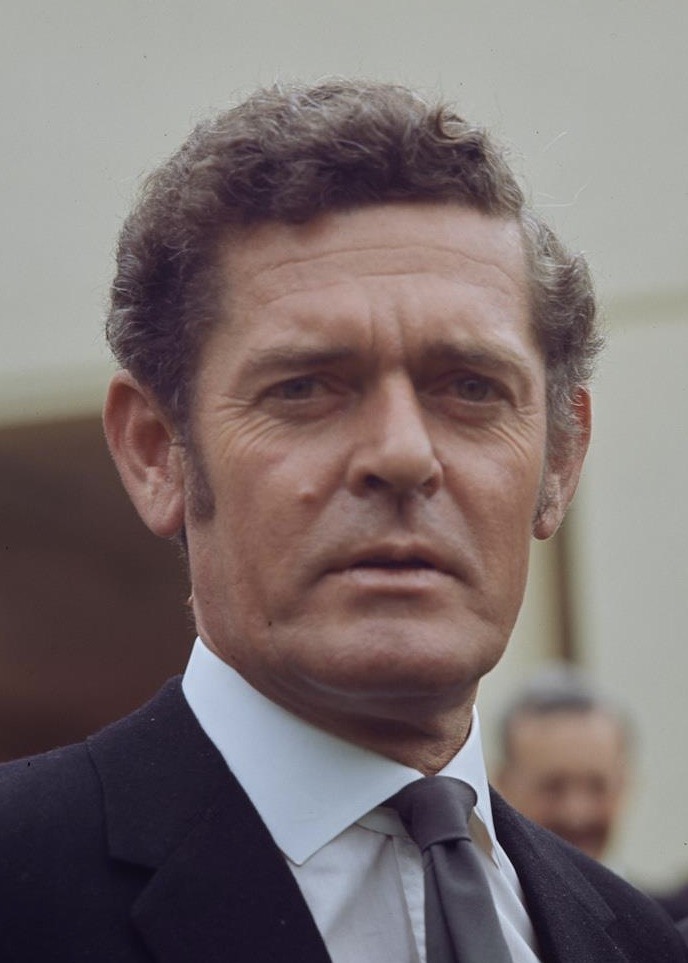
Tom Hughes

- 1 November – Fay Marles, feminist and public servant (b. 1926)
- 2 November – Cassius, saltwater crocodile, largest crocodile in captivity (death announced on this date)
- 4 November – Jim Webber, politician (b. 1940)
- 5 November – Dave Stephens, athletic runner (b. 1928)
- 6 November – Phyllis O'Donnell, surfer (b. 1937)
- 10 November – Rex Blundell, cricketer (b. 1942)
- 11 November – Ray Baxter, Australian rules footballer (b. 1940)
- 13 November – Ken Shorter, actor (death announced on this date)
- 15 November –
  - Eileen Kramer, dancer (b. 1914)
  - Elvstroem, thoroughbred racehorse (b. 2000)
- 18 November – Colin Petersen, musician and actor (b. 1946)
- 20 November – Kit McMahon, Australian-born British banker (b. 1927)
- 23 November – John Delzoppo, politician (b. 1931)
- 28 November –
  - Tom Hughes, Attorney-General and barrister (b. 1921)
  - James Beauregard-Smith, convicted murderer and rapist (b. 1943) (death announced on this date)

=== December ===
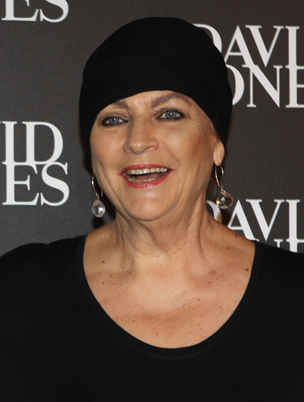
Maggie Tabberer

- 1 December – Ian Redpath, cricketer (b. 1941)
- 2 December – Neale Fraser, tennis player (b. 1933)
- 6 December – Maggie Tabberer, model, fashion entrepreneur and television personality (b. 1936)
- 7 December – Jim Leedman, politician (b. 1938)
- 9 December – Terry Nicoll, modern pentathlete (b. 1933)
- 10 December – Brenda Walker, writer (b. 1957)
- 11 December – Hugh Cornish, television personality (b. 1934)
- 12 December –
  - Clive Robertson, radio and television broadcaster (b. 1945) (death announced on this date)
  - Barry Cheatley, Australian rules footballer (b. 1939)
- 13 December – Kevin Andrews, politician (b. 1955)
- 14 December – Austin Asche, judge (b. 1925)
- 18 December –
  - John Marsden, writer (b. 1950)
  - Marty Mayberry, paralympic alpine skier (b. 1986)
- 19 December – Michael Leunig, cartoonist (b. 1945)
- 23 December – Burt, saltwater crocodile (death announced on this date)
- 29 December – Nigel Buesst, filmmaker (b. 1938) (death announced on this date)
- 30 December –
  - Sir Fraser Stoddart, British-American chemist (b. 1942)
  - Michael Turner, Australian rules footballer (b. 1954)
  - Bob Bertles, jazz musician (b. 1939)

== See also ==
=== Country overviews ===
- 2020s in Australia political history
- History of Australia
- History of modern Australia
- Outline of Australia
- Government of Australia
- Politics of Australia
- Years in Australia
- Timeline of Australia history
- 2024 in Australian literature
- 2024 in Australian music
- 2024 in Australian sport
  - 2024 in Australian rules football
- 2024 in Australian television
- List of Australian films of 2024
