= Cheatley =

Cheatley is an English surname. Notable people with the surname include:

- Barry Cheatley (1939–2024), Australian rules footballer
- Cath Cheatley (born 1983), New Zealand professional road and track cyclist
