= 2027 in Australia =

- Decades: 2000s; 2010s; 2020s; 2030s
- See also: Other events of 2027; Federal election; Timeline of Australian history

The following is a list of events including expected and scheduled events for the year 2027 in Australia.

== Events ==
=== Future and scheduled events ===
- 13 March – 2027 New South Wales state election
- 7 April - 2027 South Australian local elections

== Sport ==
- 11–15 March – 150th Anniversary Test match
- 1 October–13 November – 2027 Men's Rugby World Cup

== Holidays ==
Holiday	Date	ACT	NSW	NT	QLD	SA	TAS	VIC	WA	Ref.
New Year's Day	Friday 1 January	Yes	Yes	Yes	Yes	Yes	Yes	Yes	Yes	
Australia Day	Monday 26 January	Yes	Yes	Yes	Yes	Yes	Yes	Yes	Yes	
Royal Hobart Regatta (only observed in certain areas of Tasmania)	Monday 9 February	No	No	No	No	No	Yes	No	No	
Labour Day (WA)	Monday 1 March	No	No	No	No	No	No	No	Yes	
Public holiday under different names	Monday 8 March	Canberra Day	No	No	No	Adelaide Cup Day	Eight Hours Day	Labour Day	No	
Good Friday	Friday 26 March	Yes	Yes	Yes	Yes	Yes	Yes	Yes	Yes	
Easter Saturday	Saturday 27 March	Yes	Yes	Yes	Yes	Yes	No	Yes	No	
Easter Sunday	Sunday 28 March	Yes	Yes	No	Yes	No	No	Yes	No	
Easter Monday	Monday 29 March	Yes	Yes	Yes	Yes	Yes	Yes	Yes	Yes	
Easter Tuesday	Tuesday 30 March	No	No	No	No	No	Yes	No	No	
ANZAC Day	Monday 26 April	Yes	Yes	Yes	Yes	Yes	Yes	Yes	Yes	
May Day	Monday 3 May	No	No	Yes	Labour Day (QLD)	No	No	No	No	
Reconciliation Day	Monday 31 May	Yes	No	No	No	No	No	No	No	
Western Australia Day	Monday 7 June	No	No	No	No	No	No	No	Yes	
King's Birthday	Monday 14 June	Yes	Yes	Yes	No	Yes	Yes	Yes	No	
Picnic Day	Monday 2 August	No	No	Yes	No	No	No	No	No	
Royal Queensland Show (Brisbane area only)	Wednesday 11 August	No	No	No	Yes	No	No	No	No	
Friday before the AFL Grand Final	Friday TBC	No	No	No	No	No	No	Yes	No	
King's Birthday	Monday 27 September	No	No	No	No	No	No	No	Yes	
Labour Day	Monday 4 October	Yes	Yes	No	King's Birthday	Yes	No	No	No	
Recreation Day (all parts of Tasmania which do not observe Royal Hobart Regatta)	Monday 1 November	No	No	No	No	No	Yes	No	No	
Melbourne Cup	Tuesday 2 November	No	No	No	No	No	No	Yes	No	
Christmas Eve (from 7pm to 12 midnight)	Friday 24 December	No	No	Yes	Yes	Yes	No	No	No	
Christmas Day	Saturday 25 December	Yes	Yes	Yes	Yes	Yes	Yes	Yes	Yes	
Boxing Day	Sunday 26 December	Yes	Yes	Yes	Yes	Yes	Yes	Yes	Yes	
New Year's Eve (from 7pm to 12 midnight)	Friday 31 December	No	No	Yes	No	Yes	No	No	No	
