= National Mental Health Commission =

Agency overview
- Formed: 1 January 2012
- Jurisdiction: Australian Government
- Agency executives: Lucinda Brogden, Chair; Christine Morgan, Chief Executive Officer
- Parent department: Department of Health and Aged Care
- Website: mentalhealthcommission.gov.au

The National Mental Health Commission (the Commission) is an Australian Government executive agency established in 2012 to provide robust policy advice and evidence on ways to improve Australia’s mental health and suicide prevention system, and to act as a catalyst for change to achieve those improvements through monitoring and reporting on investment in mental health and suicide prevention initiatives and ongoing engagement with stakeholders across the mental health and related sectors. The Commission's role is purely advisory and does not advocate for specific individuals or groups, but for better system outcomes and accountability.

The current Chair of the Commission is Lucinda Brogden AM, with Christine Morgan as the Chief Executive Officer. Lucy Brogden AM is supported by 11 other Commissioners, including Christine Morgan.

== Recent Major projects ==
=== Lived Experience Workforce Development Guidelines ===
The Commission has developed the National Lived Experience (Peer) Workforce Development Guidelines under Action 29 of the Fifth National Mental Health and Suicide Prevention Plan.

The Guidelines are primarily intended to inform decision makers, including employers and funding bodies and to support change across the mental health sector by improving understanding of the benefits of the Lived Experience workforce and by supporting employers to assess their local readiness and prioritise activities that support successful implementation.

=== Children’s Mental Health and Wellbeing Strategy ===
The Commission has developed the National Children’s Mental Health and Wellbeing Strategy as part of the Australian Government’s long-term national health plan. It is the first time a national government has developed a strategy that considers mental health and wellbeing outcomes for children from birth to 12 years of age, as well as their families and communities who nurture them.

=== National Workplace Initiative ===
In the 2019–20 Federal Budget the Government announced an investment of $11.5 million over four years for the National Workplace Initiative (NWI). The NWI provides a nationally consistent approach to workplace mental health.

A unique feature of the NWI is that it was initiated by the Mentally Healthy Workplace Alliance. The Alliance is made up of national organisations from the business, union, government, workplace health and mental health sectors leading change to promote and create mentally healthy workplaces.

=== Stigma and Discrimination Reduction Strategy ===
The National Stigma and Discrimination Reduction Strategy includes a long-term vision for Australia where stigma and discrimination on the basis of mental ill-health are no longer barriers to people living long and contributing lives.

The Strategy’s focus and objectives include:

· Reduce self-stigma amongst those who experience mental ill-health and those who support them.

· Reduce public stigma by changing attitudes and behaviours in the general community and amongst identified target audiences.

· Take steps towards eliminating structural stigma and discrimination towards those affected by mental ill-health in identified settings.

The Strategy will be developed in partnership with people with lived experience of mental ill-health and people who have been directly affected by stigma, along with people with other forms of expertise across the health sector and broader community.
