= Fred Smith (Australian footballer) =

Australian rules footballer (1941–2024)

Personal information
- Full name: Frederick Smith
- Born: 30 August 1941
- Died: 21 June 2024 (aged 82)
- Original team: North Reservoir
- Height: 196 cm (6 ft 5 in)
- Weight: 92 kg (203 lb)

Playing career^{1}
Years	Club	Games (Goals)
1961	Collingwood	1 (0)
- ^{1} Playing statistics correct to the end of 1961.

Frederick Smith (30 August 1941 – 21 June 2024) was an Australian rules footballer who played with Collingwood in the Victorian Football League (VFL) and Sturt in the South Australian National Football League (SANFL).

A ruckman, Smith was recruited from North Reservoir Football Club and won two best and fairests for the Collingwood Under 19s before making his senior debut in Round 5 of the 1961 VFL season, against Fitzroy at Collingwood's home ground Victoria Park.

Returning to the Collingwood reserves, Smith's season was impacted by injuries and he moved to Sturt for the 1962 SANFL season. Smith's first season with Sturt saw him become one of the leading ruckmen in the SANFL, winning selection for South Australia and named in the Adelaide Advertiser's Team of the Year.

Smith however continued to battle injuries, missing almost the entire 1963 SANFL season to a knee injury and was then hit by a car in early 1964, eventually leading to his retirement.

Following his retirement, Smith ran coaching clinics for juniors, including trips to regional South Australia.

In April 2024, it was revealed that Smith was battling Non-Hodgkin lymphoma but was still well enough to meet some of the current Collingwood squad when they were in Adelaide. Smith died from the cancer in Adelaide, on 21 June 2024, at the age of 82.
