= Henry Gunstone =

Australian rules footballer and cricketer (1940–2024)

Personal information
- Full name: Henry Gunstone
- Born: 19 July 1940
- Died: 1 June 2024 (aged 83)
- Debut: Round 11, 1960, South Melbourne vs. Footscray, at Western Oval
- Height: 178 cm (5 ft 10 in)
- Weight: 77 kg (170 lb)

Playing career^{1}
Years	Club	Games (Goals)
1960–1962	South Melbourne	13 (4)
- ^{1} Playing statistics correct to the end of 1962.

Henry Gunstone (19 July 1940 – 1 June 2024) was an Australian rules football and cricketer. He played thirteen games for the then South Melbourne Football Club in the Victorian Football League (VFL) and played eleven games in the Victorian Premier Cricket competition for the Richmond Cricket Club.

Gunstone was nicknamed the "Bradman of the Bush" during his long sporting career as a player and administrator in the Ararat region. In local cricket he scored 129 centuries, including several double and triple centuries. He played for the Victorian Country XI against touring Test teams from England, South Africa, Pakistan, New Zealand and the West Indies between 1964 and 1982.

Gunstone worked for 36 years for the Ararat Rural City Council. He was instrumental in the town's celebration of its Chinese links with the establishment of the Gum San Chinese Heritage Centre and Ararat's sister city agreement with Taishan, Guangdong. He died on 1 June 2024, at the age of 83. He and his wife Joy had a daughter and a son.
