= Rex Blundell =

Australian cricketer (1942–2024)

Personal information
- Full name: Rex Pole Blundell
- Born: 8 May 1942; Adelaide, South Australia, Australia
- Died: 10 November 2024 (aged 82); Adelaide, South Australia, Australia
- Batting: Right-handed
- Role: Wicket-keeper

Domestic team information
- Years: Team
- 1964/65-1970/71: South Australia

Career statistics
Competition	First-class	List A
Matches	24	3
Runs scored	552	42
Batting average	15.33	–
100s/50s	0/1	0/0
Top score	66	30*
Catches/stumpings	64/13	0/0
- Source: Cricinfo, 18 May 2018

Rex Pole Blundell (8 May 1942 – 10 November 2024) was an Australian cricketer. He played 24 first-class and three List A matches for South Australia between 1964 and 1971.

Blundell died in Adelaide on 10 November 2024, at the age of 82.
