= Lois Bryson =

Australian sociologist (1937 – 2024)

- Born: 5 October 1937
- Died: 7 January 2024 (aged 86)
- Education: University of Melbourne; Monash University
- Known for: Sociologist

Lois Joyce Bryson (5 October 1937 – 7 January 2024) was an Australian sociologist. She was one of the founders of academic sociology in Australia.

== Education ==
Bryson completed her Bachelor of Arts (BA) in 1959 followed by a Diploma of Education in 1964, both at the University of Melbourne, before achieving her PhD in sociology at Monash University. She was an early second-wave feminist in Australia.

== Career ==
In 1972, Bryson wrote An Australian Newtown (1972), Australia's first sociological study of a suburb with Faith Thompson and, with Ian Winter, Social Change, Suburban Lives (1999), a re-study of the same suburb thirty years on.

Bryson also authored studies regarding women in sport, women's health and the welfare state. She worked as a professor at the University of Adelaide.

Her career in research was recognised by her election as a fellow of the Academy of the Social Sciences in Australia in 1998, membership of the Australian Research Council's research training and careers committee, and the award of a Federation medal (2003).

In retirement she was an emeritus professor at the University of Newcastle and an adjunct professor at Royal Melbourne Institute of Technology.

== Death ==
Bryson died in January 2024. She is survived by her two children and two grandchildren.
