= Leon Berner =

Australian rules footballer (1935–2024)

Personal information
- Born: 8 September 1935
- Died: 17 June 2024 (aged 88)
- Original team: University High School
- Height: 179 cm (5 ft 10 in)
- Weight: 73.5 kg (162 lb)

Playing career^{1}
| Years | Club | Games (Goals) |
| 1955–57 | Carlton | 18 (4) |
- ^{1} Playing statistics correct to the end of 1957.

Leon Berner (8 September 1935 – 17 June 2024) was an Australian rules footballer who played with Carlton in the Victorian Football League (VFL). He died on 17 June 2024, at the age of 88.
