= Mike Taylor (music executive) =

American music executive

- Born: March 15, 1967; New York, United States of America
- Died: January 11, 2024 (aged 56); Brewster, New York, United States of America
- Occupation: music executive
- Known for: A 15-year association with Universal Music Australia

Michael Tynan Taylor (March 15, 1967 – January 11, 2024) was an American music executive.

Taylor is perhaps known for his success while working in Australia which included a tenure as joint managing director of Universal Music Australia.

== Life and career ==
Growing up in New York, Taylor's early career included working with Columbia Records and the Maverick Recording Company.

He moved to Sydney in 2001 where he commenced working as head of A&R for Sony Music. As an A&R executive for Delta Goodrem, Taylor is credited with helping Goodrem's album Innocent Eyes achieve considerable success.

Taylor then briefly returned to the United States where he served as senior director with Sony's Epic Records division but returned to Australia in 2007 where he began a 15-year association with Universal Music Australia.

While at Universal Music Australia, Taylor is credited with helping grow the company's array of talent, signing the likes of the Hilltop Hoods, Havana Brown, Baker Boy, Briggs, Clare Bowditch, Shane Nicholson, The McClymonts and Dean Lewis.

Citing personal reasons, Taylor announced in September 2022 he would be leaving his role as managing director of Universal Music Australia.

Taylor died from cancer at the age of 54 on 11 January 2024 in Brewster, New York.

A funeral was held for Taylor on 20 January 2024 at St Lawrence O'Toole Church in Brewster, New York while a celebration of Taylor's life is to be held at the Employees Only cocktail bar and restaurant in Sydney on 27 March 2024.
