= Sam Landsberger =

Australian sports journalist (1988–2024)

- Born: Samuel Brice Landsberger; 30 December 1988; Melbourne, Victoria, Australia
- Died: 20 August 2024 (aged 35); Richmond, Victoria, Australia

Samuel Brice Landsberger (30 December 1988 − 20 August 2024) was an Australian sports journalist.

== Personal life and education ==
Landsberger's father worked as a doctor for the Western Bulldogs for more than two decades. He attended Melbourne High School between 2003 and 2006. He went to Monash University from 2007 to 2010, where he earned a Bachelor’s Degree in journalism.

== Career ==
Landsberger began his work at the Herald Sun in March 2010 and served as an Australian Football League (AFL) and cricket writer, as well as a weekly correspondent for Fox Footy and a presenter for Midweek Tackle. In 2013 he won the Australian Football Media Association award for the most outstanding young media performer of 2013 and was also named the Walkley Young Journalist of the Year. He won three straight Twenty20 annual media awards for cricket and a Quill Award for digital media. In March 2024, Landsberger correctly predicted Brisbane would face Sydney in the 2024 AFL Grand Final, which posthumously came to pass.

== Death ==
On 20 August 2024, Landsberger was struck and killed by a truck while at an intersection in the Melbourne suburb of Richmond. He was 35. His death was acknowledged when the 2024 AFL Women's season launched.
