= Barry Cheatley =

Australian rules footballer (1939–2024)

Personal information
- Full name: Barry Cheatley
- Born: 7 January 1939
- Died: 12 December 2024 (aged 85)
- Original team: Redan
- Height: 187 cm (6 ft 2 in)
- Weight: 94 kg (207 lb)
- Position: Fullback

Playing career^{1}
Years	Club	Games (Goals)
1959–1964	North Melbourne	81 (3)
- ^{1} Playing statistics correct to the end of 1964.

Barry Cheatley (7 January 1939 – 12 December 2024) was an Australian rules footballer who played for the North Melbourne Football Club in the Victorian Football League (VFL). Cheatley died on 12 December 2024, at the age of 85.
