= Department of Health and Aged Care =

The Department of Health and Aged Care refers to either of two former Australian government departments:

- Department of Health and Aged Care (1998–2001), first iteration
- Department of Health and Aged Care (2022–2025), second and final iteration

== See also ==
- Department of Health and Ageing, Australian government department from 2001–2013
