= 1991 in Germany =

- Decades: 1970s; 1980s; 1990s; 2000s; 2010s
- See also: Other events of 1991; History of Germany • Timeline • Years

Events in the year 1991 in Germany.

== Incumbents ==
- President - Richard von Weizsäcker
- Chancellor – Helmut Kohl

== Events ==
- January 18: The Fourth Kohl cabinet led by Helmut Kohl was sworn in.
- February 15–26: 41st Berlin International Film Festival
- March 21: Germany in the Eurovision Song Contest 1991
- June 17: The Treaty of Good Neighbourship is signed by Germany and Poland
- June 20: The capital decision is made over which city will be the German capital city.
- August: Launch of the MK3 Volkswagen Golf, which replaces the MK2 model which was in production for eight years. A saloon version to replace the Jetta is due early next year.
- September 17–23: Hoyerswerda riots
- December: The Volkswagen Golf is voted European Car of the Year, the first Volkswagen to receive this accolade.
- German company Krupp bought Hoesch AG.

=== Elections ===
- Rhineland-Palatinate state election

== Sport ==
- 1990–91 Bundesliga
- 1990–91 2. Bundesliga
- 1990–91 ice hockey Bundesliga season
- 1991 Men's Hockey Champions Trophy
- 1991 Women's Hockey Champions Trophy
- 1991 ATP German Open
- 1991 BMW Open
- 1991 German Grand Prix
- 1991 German motorcycle Grand Prix
- 1991 DTM season

== Births ==
- 4 January - Pascal Bodmer, German ski jumper
- 19 January - Corinna Harrer, German runner
- 27 January - Christian Bickel, German footballer
- 28 January - Kai Kazmirek, German athlete
- 5 February - Henriette Confurius, German actress
- 9 February - Almuth Schult, German footballer
- 21 February - Philip Heintz, German swimmer
- 26 April – Hubert Trzybinski, German rower
- 1 May - Levina, German singer
- 2 May - Sebastian Hertner, German footballer (d. 2025)
- 10 May - Giorgos Machlelis, Greek international footballer
- 14 May - Niklas Hörber, German footballer
- 15 May - Jennifer Hof, German fashion model
- 23 May - Lena Meyer-Landrut, German singer-songwriter
- 26 May - Marie-Sophie Hindermann, German artistic gymnast
- 24 June - Robin Erewa, German athlete
- 25 June - Anna Zaja, German tennis player
- 14 July - Cihan Özkara, German-Turkish-Azerbaijani footballer
- 20 September - Thomas Röhler, German athlete
- 28 September - Pamela Dutkiewicz, German athlete
- 29 October - Alske Freter, German politician
- 5 December - Carolin Schäfer, German athlete
- 16 December - Andreas Hofmann, German athlete
- 21 December - Peter Baumgartner, ice hockey player
- 27 December - Jimi Blue Ochsenknecht, German actor
- Enja Springob, German politician

== Deaths ==
- 14 January - Heli Finkenzeller, German actress (born 1911)
- 13 February - Arno Breker, German architect and sculptor (born 1900)
- 13 March - Josef Manger, German heavy weight lifter (born 1913)
- 16 March - Trude Herr, singer (born 1927)
- 1 April - Detlev Karsten Rohwedder, German politician (born 1932)
- 8 April - Tilo von Berlepsch, German actor (born 1913)
- 22 April - Karl Klasen, German banker (born 1909)
- 7 May - Wolfgang Reichmann, German actress (born 1932)
- 8 June - Heidi Brühl, German actress (born 1942)
- 21 June - Klaus Schwarzkopf, German actor (born 1922)
- 21 June - Karl Krolow, German poet (born 1915)
- 23 June — Michael Pfleghar, German film director and screenwriter (born 1933)
- 24 June - Franz Hengsbach, German cardinal of Roman Catholic Church (born 1910)
- 28 June - Hans Nüsslein, German tennis player (born 1910)
- 1 July - Joachim Kroll, serial killer (born 1933)
- 9 August - Richard Löwenthal, German author and journalist (born 1908)
- 16 August - Johannes Wiese, German pilot during World War II, a fighter ace (born 1915)
- 21 August - Wolfgang Hildesheimer, German writer (born 1916)
- 3 September - Falk Harnack, German film director and screenwriter (born 1913)
- 27 September - Karl-Heinz Köpcke, German news speaker (born 1922)
- 4 October - Heinrich Hellwege, German politician (born 1908)
- 9 October - Roy Black, German actor and singer (born 1943)
- 23 November - Klaus Kinski, German actor (born 1926)
- 1 December - Ernst Albrecht, German politician (born 1914
- 12 December - Gustav Schäfer, German rower (born 1906)
- 23 December - Heinrich Wöhlk, German optometrist (born 1913)
- 24 December - Alfons Goppel, German politician (born 1905)
- 25 December - Curt Bois, actor (born 1901)

== See also ==
- 1991 in German television
