= Vi Bilägare =

Swedish automobile magazine

- Categories: Automobile magazine
- Frequency: 16 times per year
- Publisher: OK Förlaget
- Founded: 1930
- Country: Sweden
- Based in: Stockholm
- Language: Swedish
- Website: www.vibilagare.se

Vi Bilägare (English: We car owners) is one of the biggest automobile magazines in Sweden. The magazine is published in Stockholm.

== Overview ==
Vi Bilägare was launched in 1930 and appears 16 times a year. In the 2000s it came out 18 times per year. The magazine is published by OK Förlaget AB and is headquartered in Stockholm.

Typical content includes automotive news and reports, new and used car reviews, test drives, DIY guides and automotive-related product tests.

The magazine is one of the organizers of the European Car of the Year award.

== Circulation ==
In 2009 Vi Bilägare was the best-selling Swedish automobile magazine with a circulation of 127,000 copies.

The magazine sold 127,300 copies in 2010 and had 359,000 readers per issue.

In 2014 its circulation was 91,400 copies.

== See also ==
- Teknikens Värld
