= Volkswagen Golf Mk3 =

Third generation of Golf compact car

Volkswagen Golf Mk3 (1H/1E)
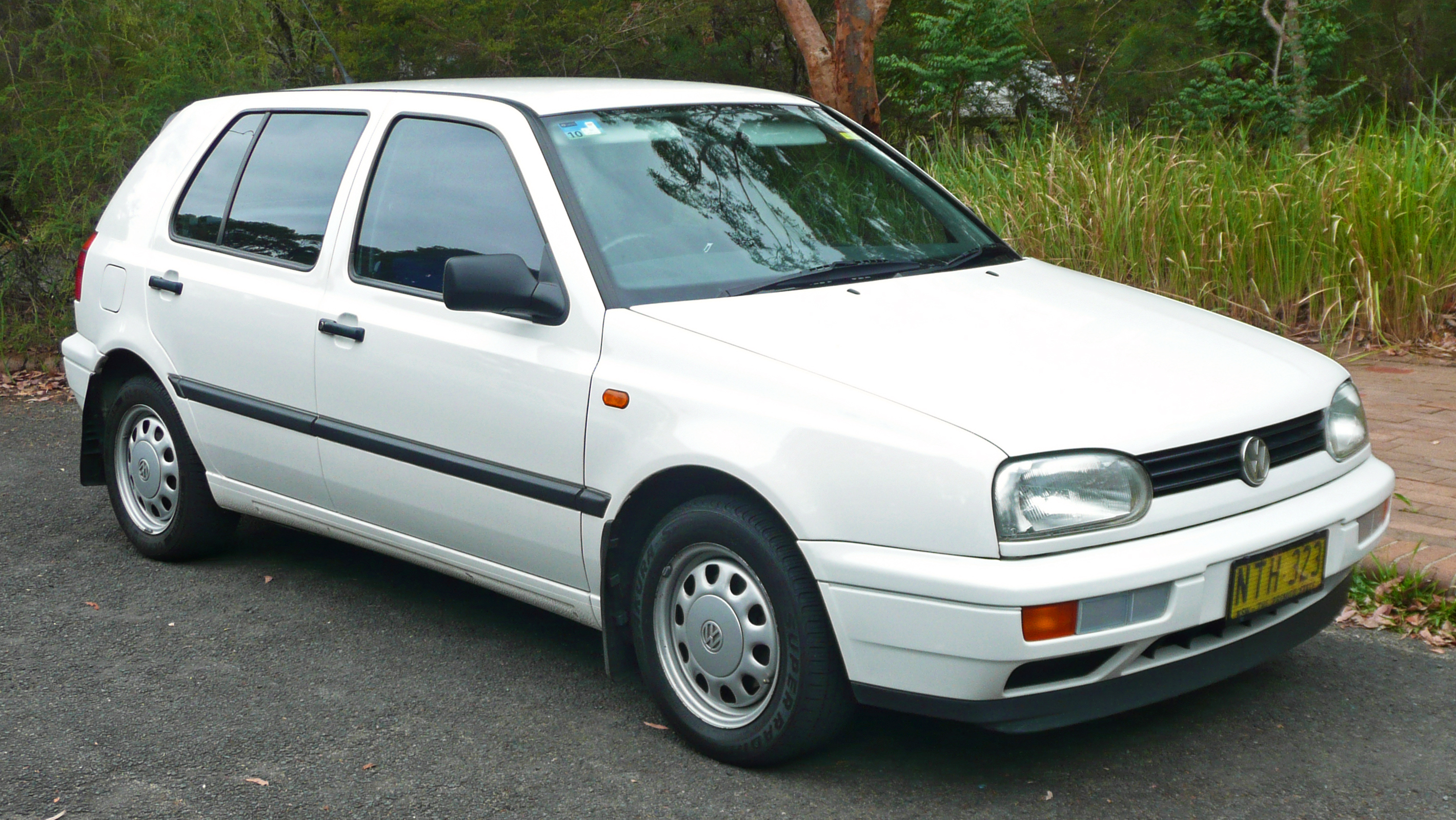

Overview
- Manufacturer: Volkswagen
- Production: 1991–1998; 1994–2002 (convertible); 4.8 million units
- Assembly: Germany: Wolfsburg; Germany: Zwickau (Volkswagen Zwickau-Mosel Plant); Mexico: Puebla; Belgium: Brussels; Slovakia: Bratislava; South Africa: Uitenhage
- Designer: J Mays; Herbert Schäfer

Body and chassis
- Class: Small family car (C)
- Body style: 3 / 5-door hatchback 5-door estate 2-door convertible
- Layout: Front engine, front-wheel drive / Syncro four-wheel drive
- Platform: Volkswagen Group A3 platform
- Related: Volkswagen Jetta; Volkswagen Vento

Powertrain
- Engine: Petrol: 1.4 L (ABD/AEX/APQ) I4; 1.6 L (ABU/AEA/AEE) I4; 1.6 L (AEK/AFT/AKS) I4; 1.8 L (AAM/ANN) I4; 1.8 L (ABS/ADZ/ACC/ANP) I4; 2.0 L (2E/ADY/AGG/AKR/ABA/AWG/AWF) I4; 2.0 L (ABF) 16v I4; 2.8 L (AAA) VR6; 2.9 L (ABV) VR6; Diesel: 1.9 L 1Y I4; 1.9 L AEY SDI I4; 1.9 L AAZ TD I4; 1.9 L 1Z/ALE/AHU TDI I4; 1.9 L AFN/AVG TDI I4
- Transmission: 4-speed automatic 4-speed / 5-speed manual

Dimensions
- Wheelbase: 1991-95: 2,471 mm (97.3 in); 1996-99: 2,474 mm (97.4 in)
- Length: 4,074 mm (160.4 in)
- Width: 1,694 mm (66.7 in)
- Height: 1991-95 & Cabrio: 1,422 mm (56.0 in); 1996-99: 1,428 mm (56.2 in)

Chronology
- Predecessor: Volkswagen Golf Mk2; Volkswagen Golf Cabriolet Mk1 (Cabrio)
- Successor: Volkswagen Golf Mk4; Volkswagen New Beetle convertible (Cabrio)

The Volkswagen Golf Mk3 is a medium-sized compact family car. It is the third generation of the Volkswagen Golf and the successor to the Volkswagen Golf Mk2, which was produced by Volkswagen from August 1991 (for the 1992 model year) to 2002 (for Cabrio convertible).

The Golf Mk3 was launched in mainland Europe in August 1991, in the United Kingdom in February 1992, and in North America in the spring of 1994. The delay in North America was due to Volkswagen's decision to supply U.S. and Canadian dealerships with Mk3 Golfs (and A3 Jettas) from the VW plant in Puebla, Mexico. Quality control problems led Volkswagen of America to reject Golfs and Jettas from Mexico. Thereafter, labor unrest at the plant delayed production. The third-generation Golf and Jetta first launched in North America as 1993 models in the San Diego, California area and in Canada, then in the autumn in the rest of North America as 1994 models.

The Mk3 Cabrio replaced the Volkswagen Cabriolet. The Mk3 Cabrio continued until the 2002 model year, when Volkswagen replaced it with a convertible version of the Volkswagen New Beetle.

Like the previous two generations, the Mk3 was supposed to be built at the TAS factory in Sarajevo, Bosnia and Herzegovina. However, when the car was first released, the Yugoslav War broke out, leading to the destruction of the factory. Due to this, TAS went bankrupt in 1995, and the Mk3 was not able to be built in Bosnia and Herzegovina, although a single Mk3 managed to roll off the assembly line in Sarajevo, its fate unknown.

The Mk3 Golf was sold in Japan alongside the Polo, where both vehicles complied with the small size class regulations that encouraged sales.

The Volkswagen Golf Mk3 got replaced with the October 1997 (1998 model year) by the introduction of the Volkswagen Golf Mk4. In some markets, the Mk3 Golf continued to be available for the 1998 model year (Americas, South Africa), and even as early 1999 model year vehicles (Canada, Mexico, US).

== Body styles ==
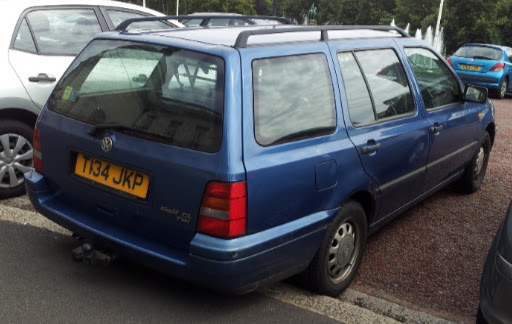
Golf Variant

As for previous generations, the Golf was available as a three- or five-door hatchback. For the first time an estate was produced, being launched in early 1993, and bringing it into line with key competitors such as the Ford Escort and Vauxhall/Opel Astra, which had all long been available as estates. The name of three-box sedan (now only with four doors) changed to Vento, in an attempt to improve the Jetta's stodgy image in Europe. In North America, where the Jetta had no such problems, the old nameplate remained.

In some markets, where the tax structure suited such a model, Volkswagen also offered a light commercial Van version of the three-door hatchback. Typically fitted with a flat plywood floor in the rear and often with blanked rear side windows, precise specifications varied for different markets to meet various local requirements for being classified as a commercial vehicle. In the United Kingdom, the Van was available only with the Umwelt ("Environment") engine, blanked rear windows, fabric interior, power steering, and a five-speed manual transmission. A petrol unit was available to special order. The Umwelt diesel was Volkswagen's then-new 1.9-liter turbodiesel (AAZ), fitted with a catalytic converter and producing 75 PS (55 kW). Payload is 510 kg (1,124 lb).

=== Cabriolet ===
The Volkswagen Golf Mk3 Cabrio (or Type 1E) was introduced in 1994 for the 1995 model year, replacing the previous MK1 Rabbit based Cabriolet. It was facelifted in 1998 (mid-1999 for non-euro markets) with the front, rear, and steering wheel styling inspired by the Golf Mk4 while still maintaining the body from the Mk3 Cabrio. These Cabrios are often referred to as the Mk3.5 Cabrios. The Volkswagen Golf Cabrio was discontinued in 2002 with a special edition called "Last Edition".

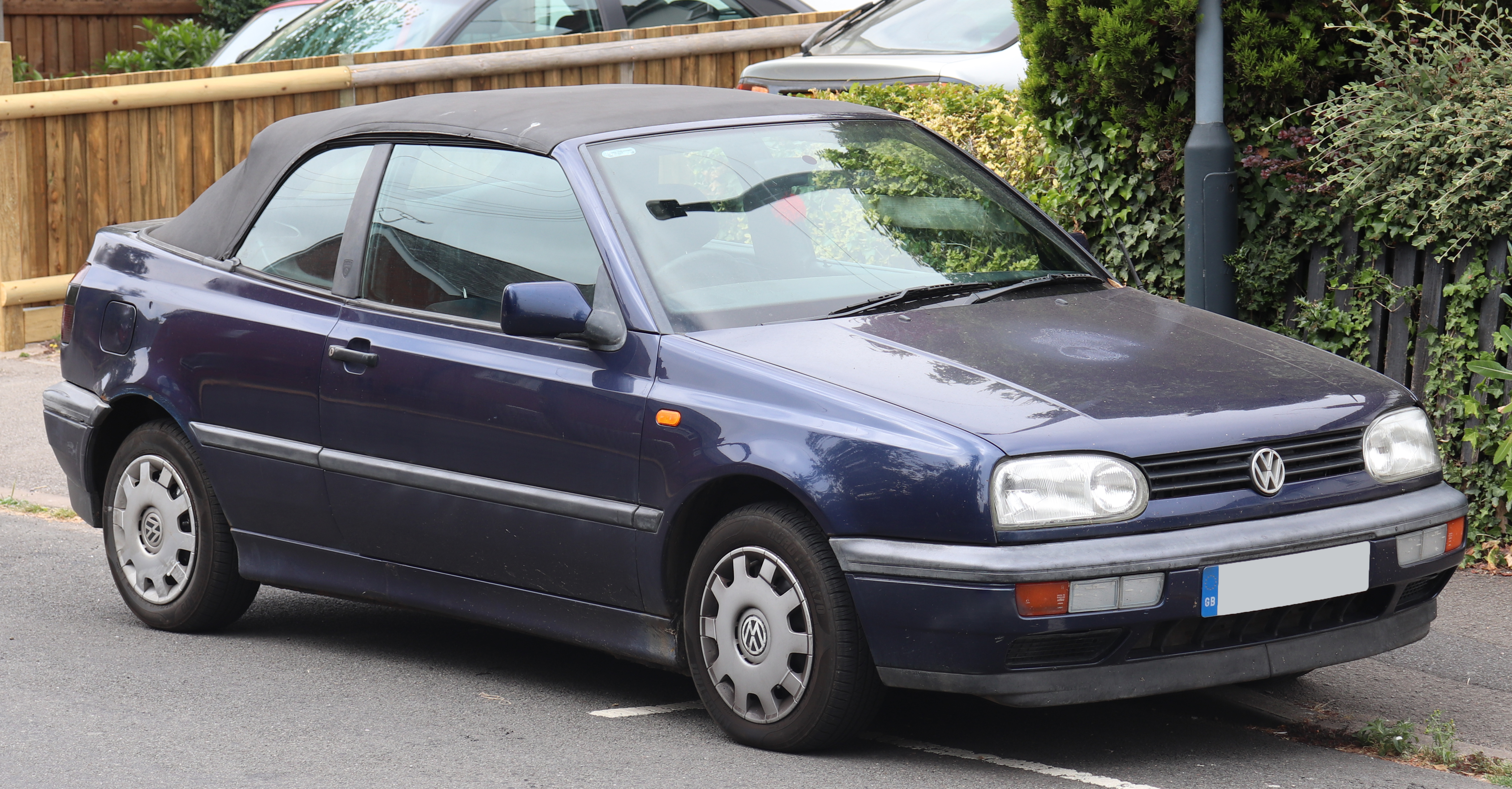
Golf Mk3 Cabrio

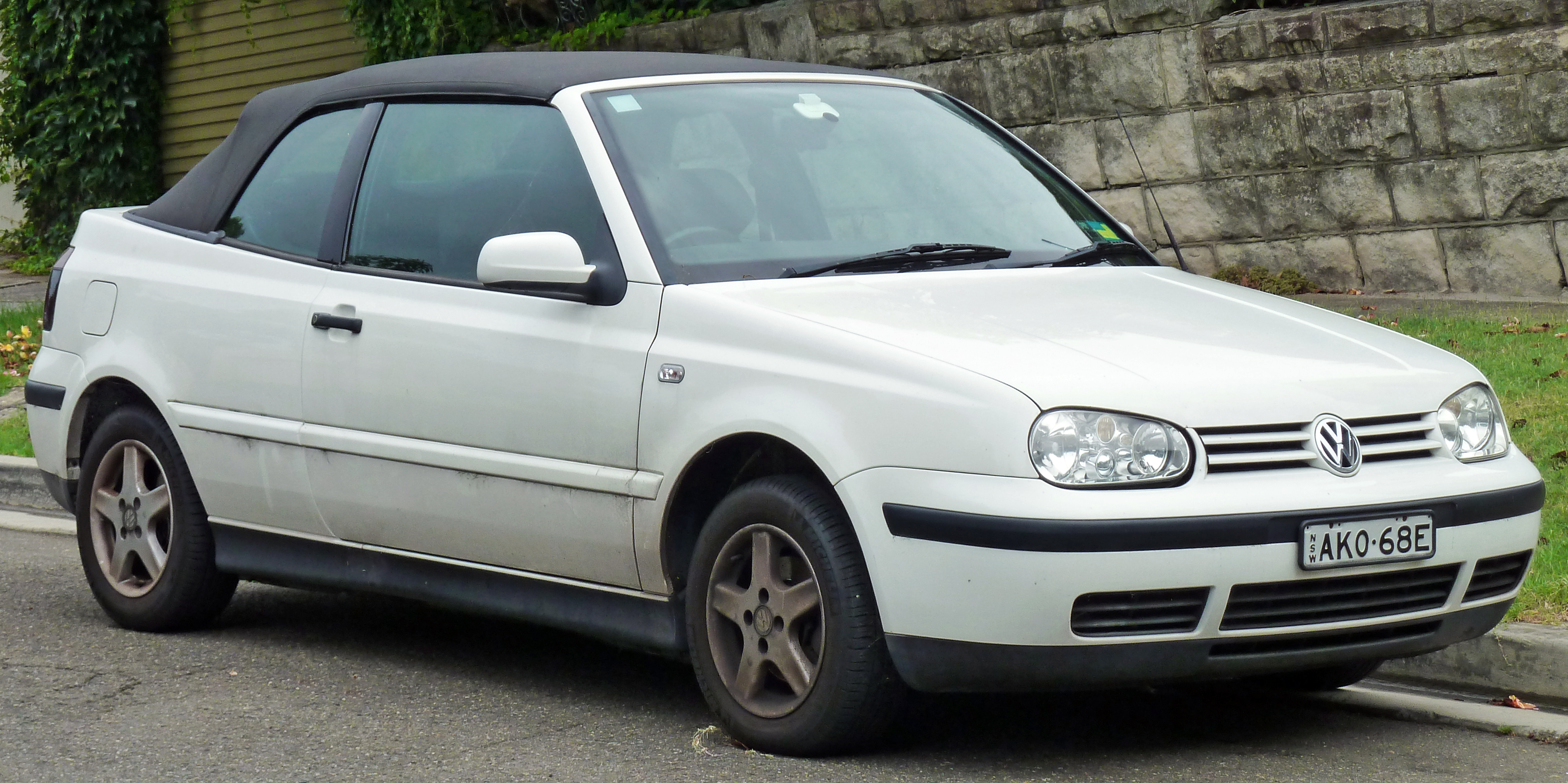
Golf Mk3.5 (Mk4) Cabrio

== Performance models ==
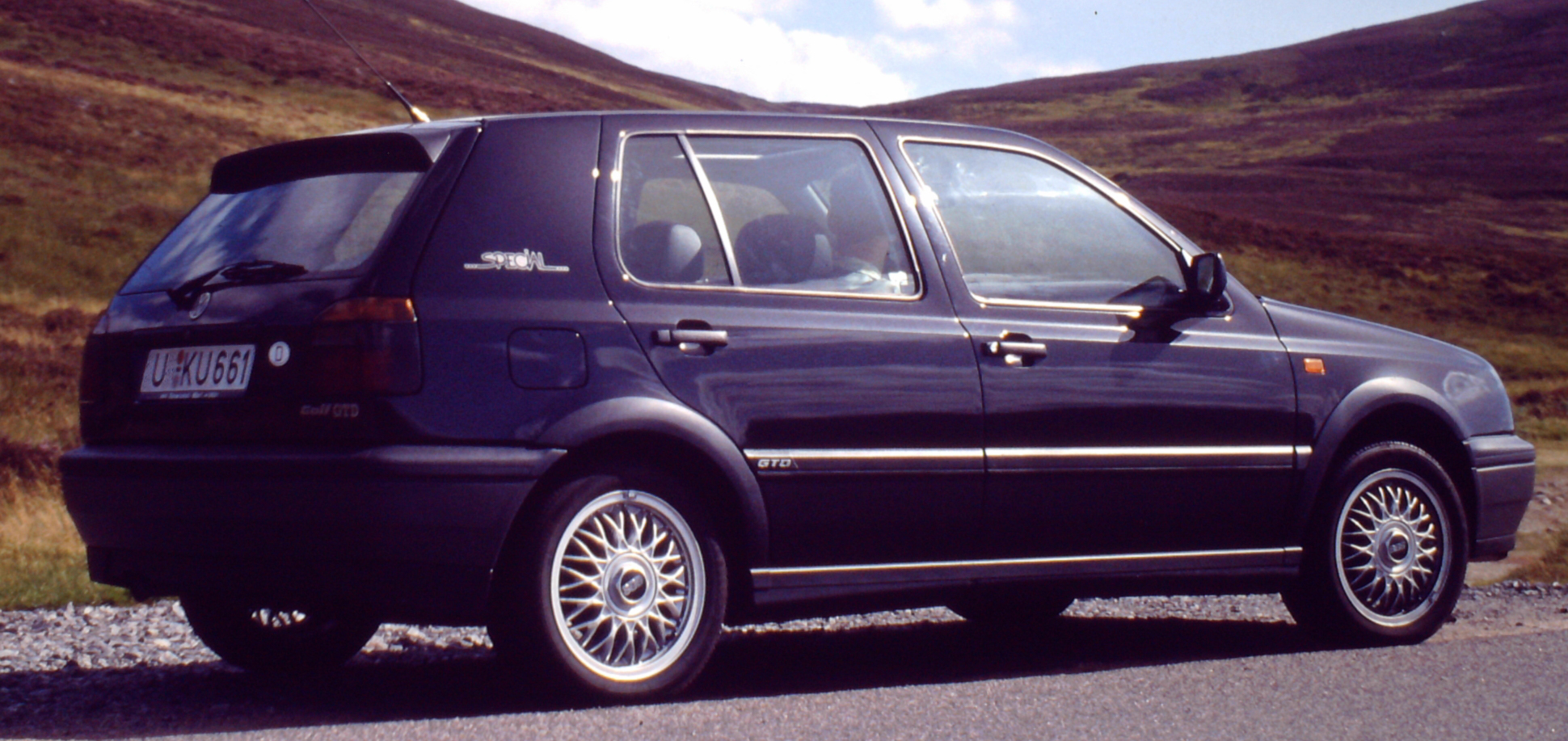
Rear view

=== GTD ===
The Golf GTD is the diesel-powered variant of the high-performance GTI version.

=== A59 ===
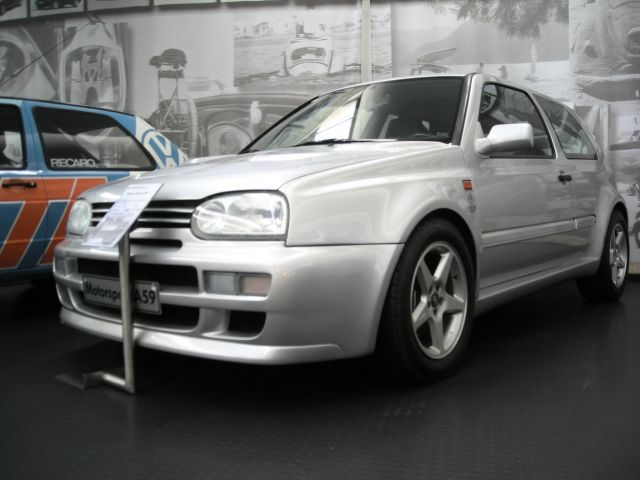
The Golf A59 prototype in the Volkswagen Museum

The cancelled Golf A59 was intended to be a 4WD model with a 275 hp (205 kW) turbocharged 1998cc engine, carbon fiber and Kevlar shell, and a full roll cage, and have the highest performance of the Mk3 Golf models. The A59 was also supposed to be able to win the World Rally Championship in 1994. The prototype can be seen at the Volkswagen Museum.

== Overview ==
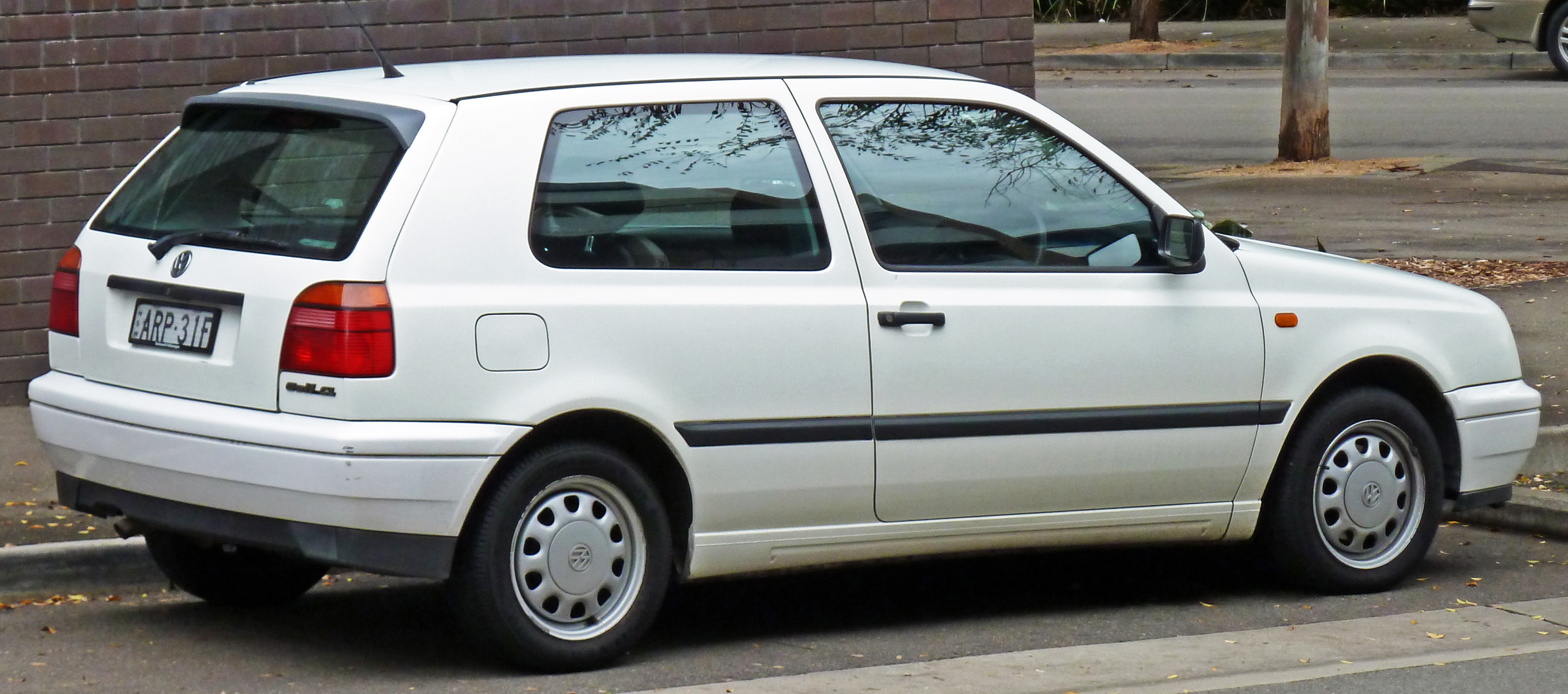
1995–1996 Golf CL 3-door hatchback (Australia)

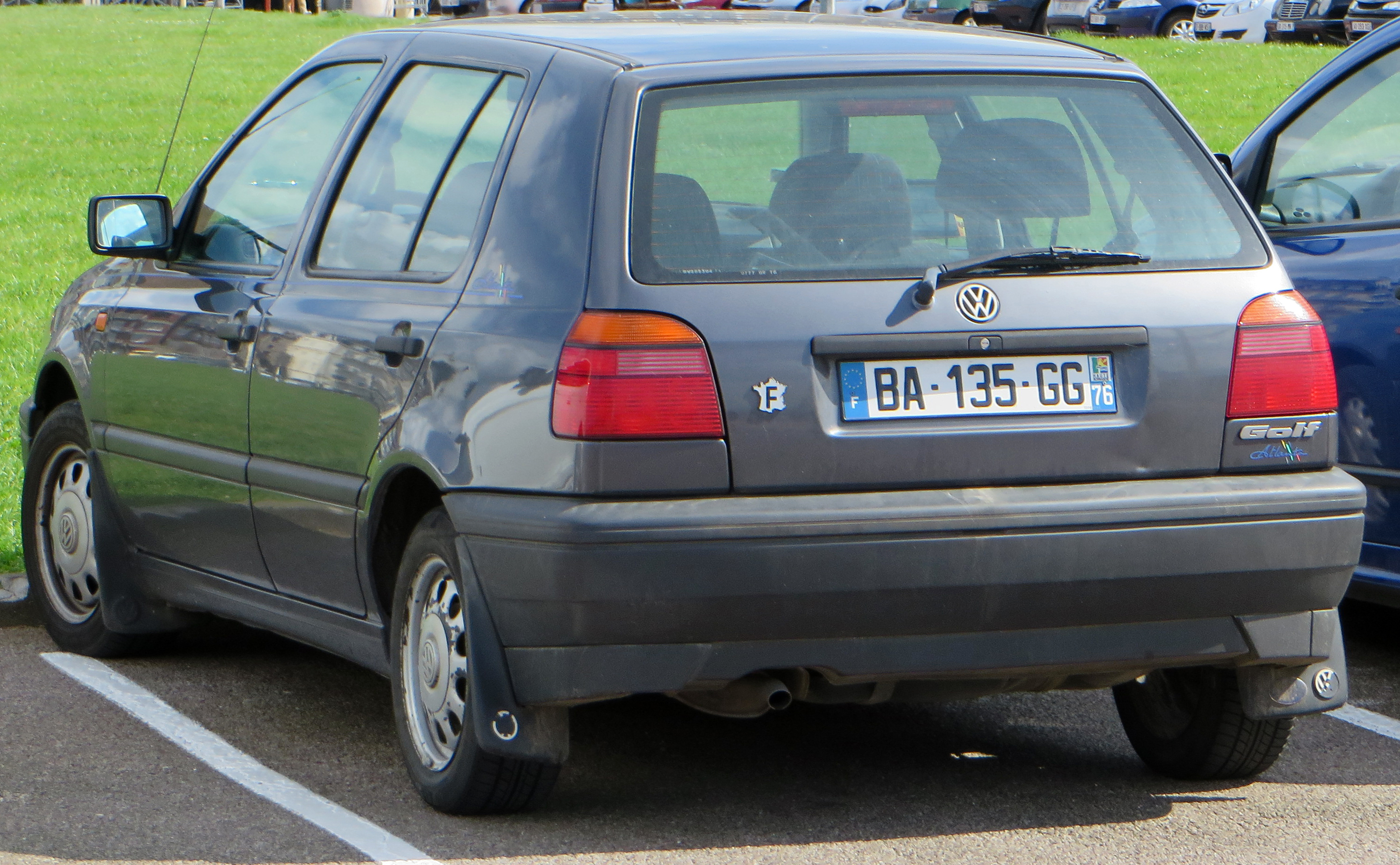
1993 Golf 5-door hatchback

A 16-valve version of the third-generation Golf GTI was introduced in 1993. The engine was enlarged to 2.0L, with power now reaching 150 PS (110 kW; 148 hp). While lower powered than the VR6, it was still relatively popular with driving enthusiasts in Europe, because it offered ample power without the thirst or tax burden of the six-cylinder. As with previous versions, the Golf Driver acted as the official GTI-look-alike in the United Kingdom. Similar to the continental market Golf GT, it looked sporting but was fitted with a single-point injected 1.8L engine.

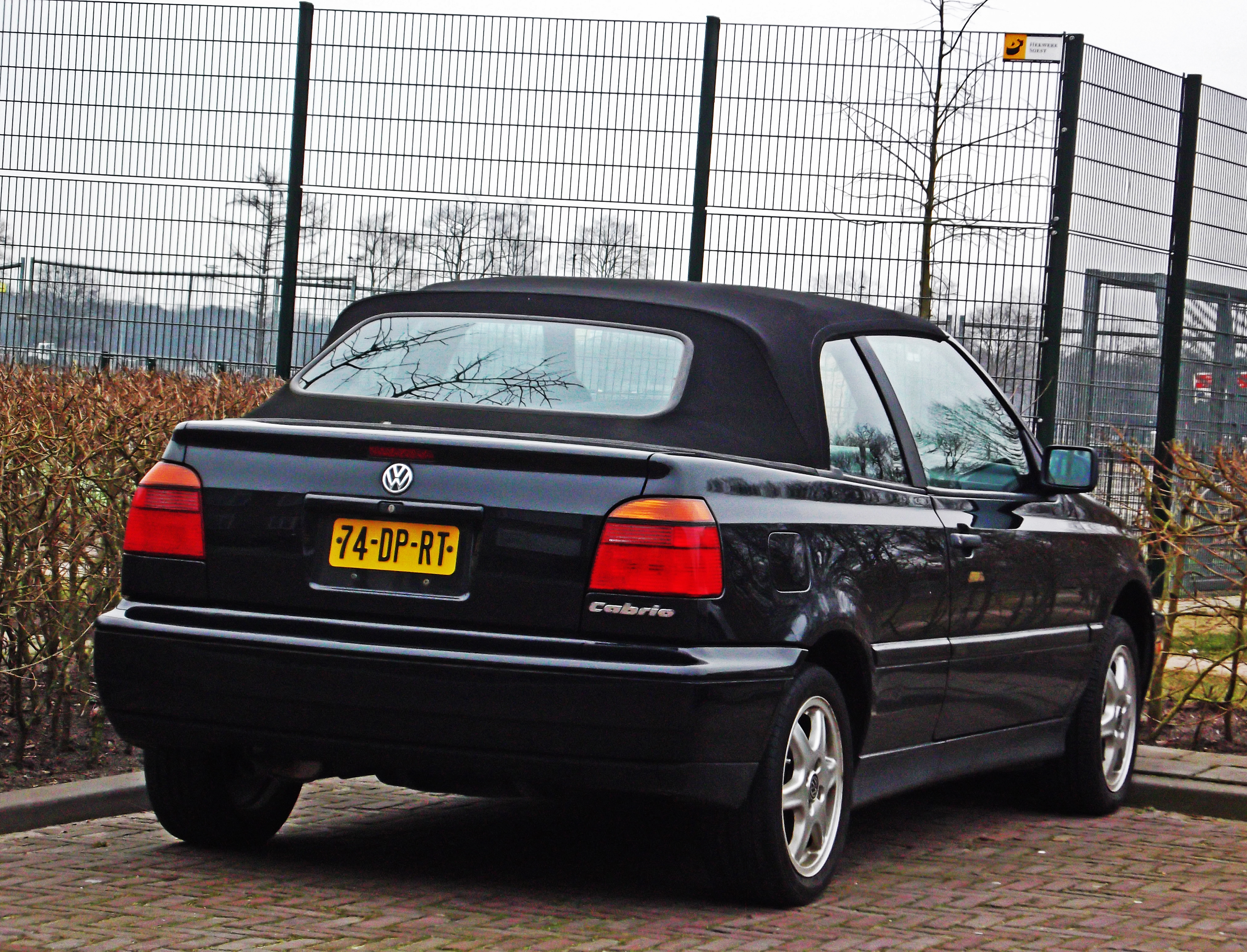
Volkswagen Cabrio

The Golf Mk3 was also the predecessor of the "diesel craze" that swept through Europe in the late 1990s and early 2000s, when Volkswagen introduced the direct-injection system with the 90 PS (66 kW; 89 hp) Golf TDI in 1993.

From its launch, all versions of the Golf came with fuel injection, to meet EEC requirements that all new cars sold in member countries from January 1993 must come with fuel injection or a catalytic converter. Non-catalyzed models were also built for those markets where there was no interest in them; power outputs were the same as for the catalyzed models. An all-new 1.4 petrol engine was the entry-level model in the MK3 Golf range.

Also offered was a naturally aspirated version of the 1.9-liter diesel engine, the SDI, offering 47 kW (64 PS; 63 hp).

Airbags were first offered on the Golf in 1992.

The Golf Mk3 was also available in "Ecomatic" form. It was powered with a diesel engine and a clutch-less manual transmission. The vehicle would freewheel by opening of the clutch as soon as the accelerator is released, and the engine was switched off after a further 1.5 seconds of inactivity, whether by stopping or coasting. Restarting the engine simply required depressing the accelerator pedal. VW had previously pioneered similar technology in the VW Polo "Formel E" in the 1980s.

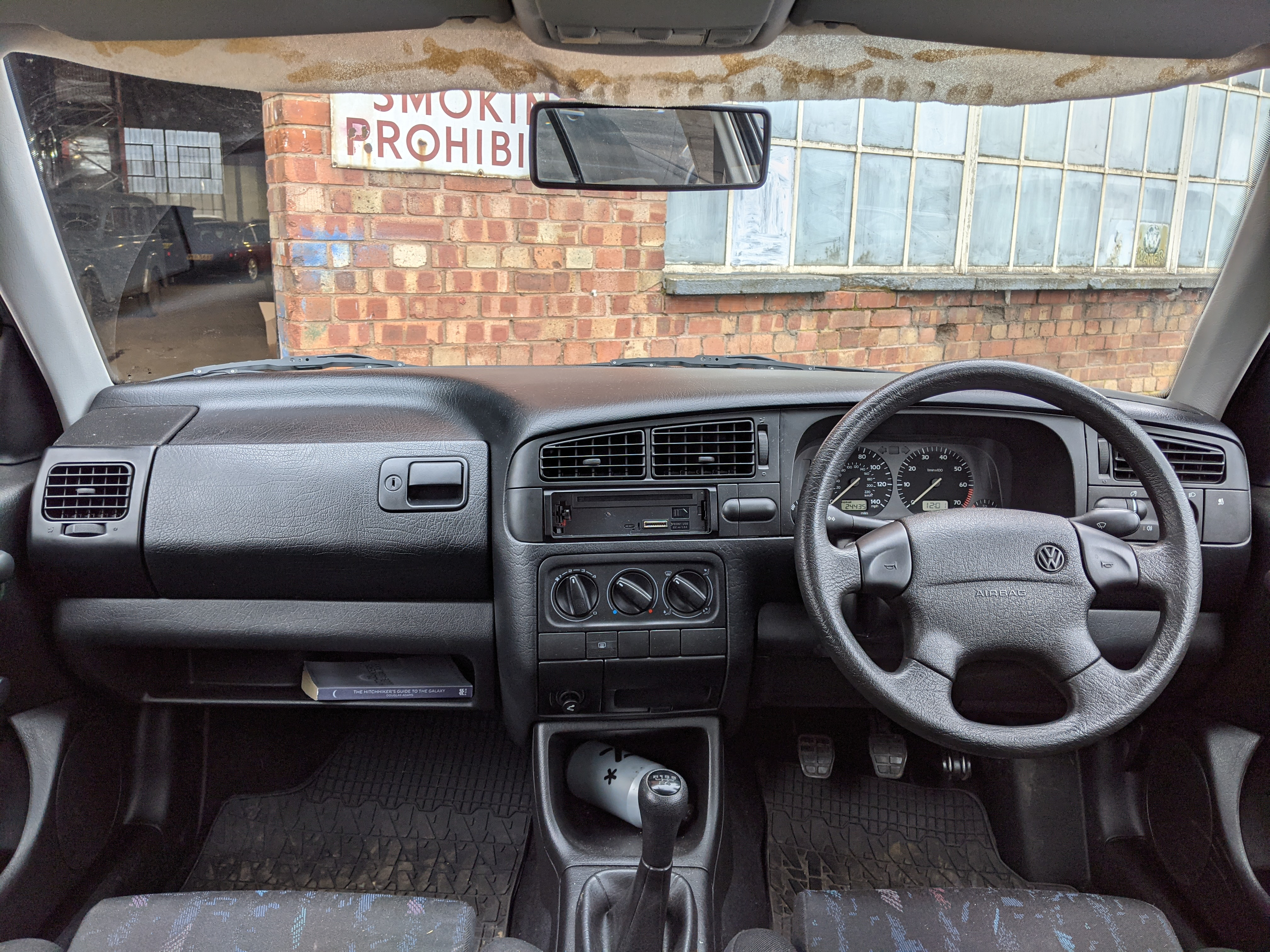
Golf Mk3 Driver interior

As had happened with the Mk1 and Mk2, the Mk3 remained available in US for a year after it was discontinued in Europe (1998). The Mk3 continued to be produced for the 1999 model year where it was sold in North and South America. These 1999 Mk3 cars were the last produced in the world and sold alongside the Mk4 in showrooms.

=== Golf CitySTROMer ===
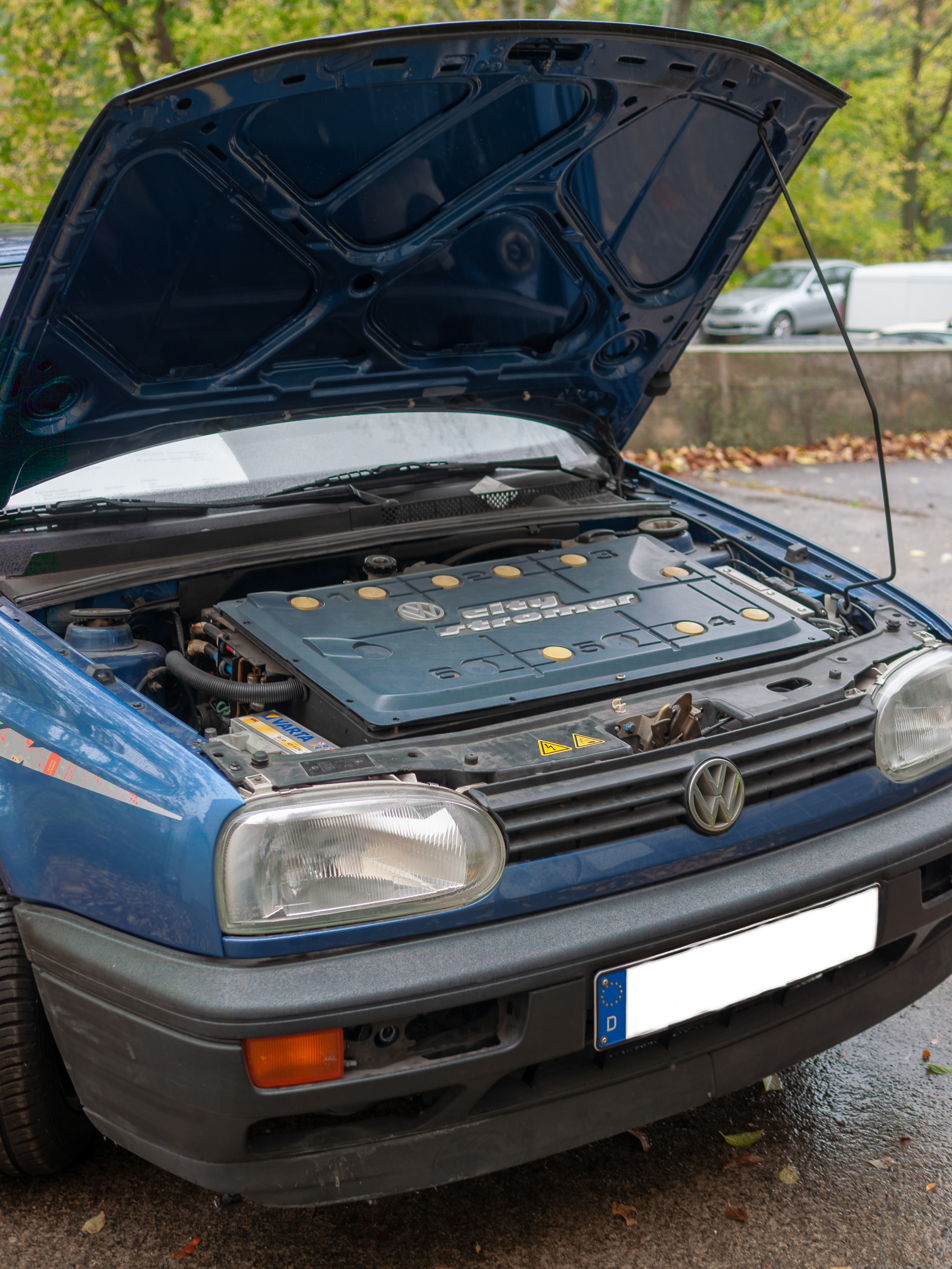
Battery pack under the hood of the electric Golf CitySTROMer.

There was also a limited production run of around 250 "CitySTROMer" vehicles, mainly sold to the German market, which were fully electric vehicles, incorporating six lead-acid batteries in the engine bay, and a further 10 underneath the luggage area. It had a range of approximately 50 km (31 mi). The vehicle could be filled with a small amount of diesel to provide heat for the cabin.

== Awards ==
- 1997 Which? Magazine Best Buys: Best Family Car
- European Car of the Year: 1992
- 1992 What Car?: Car of the Year

== Special editions ==
=== 20th Anniversary GTI ===
Volkswagen manufactured a limited run of 1,000 special-edition GTI Anniversary models, available in both 3-door and 5-door configurations, to commemorate the 20th anniversary of the GTI model.

The models in question featured the standard GTI specifications but included distinctive elements such as checkered Recaro front sport seats and matching rear seats adorned with the GTI logo. Notable interior details comprised red seat belts for both front and rear seats, a half-chromed and leather golf ball gear knob, and a steering wheel and handbrake gaiter crafted from red-stitched leather. The handbrake's release knob was also finished in red, while the instrument dials were rendered in silver. Floor mats were designed with red piping along their edges.

Externally, the red theme was further emphasized with red striping on the bumpers and red brake calipers. The vehicles were equipped with 16" x 7" split rim BBS RS 722 alloy wheels, which bore a resemblance to the 15" wheels found on the VR6 model. The exhaust system featured brushed stainless steel rear twin tailpipes, and the front fog and indicator lamps were smoked to harmonize with the rear lamps.

Three optional extras were available: an electric sunroof, air conditioning, and metallic black paintwork. Insurance premiums were set based on the standard GTI, contributing to the desirability of this model. Production was limited to six color schemes, with a total output of 1,000 units, comprising 600 8-valve models, 150 16-valve models, and 250 TDI models. The diesel variant was exclusively produced for the European market and was not available in the UK.

Many of these models found their way into the UK company car and lease market before entering the second-hand market, and it is estimated that only a few hundred remain today. The rarity of the Mark 3 Golfs can be attributed in part to quality issues associated with the steel used by Volkswagen, which has been reported to lead to significant corrosion in components such as the floor pan, door sills, and rear hatch. Independent mechanics and MOT testers recommend thorough inspections for rust, holes, and patches in the floor pan for prospective buyers.

=== Otmar Alt ===
The Golf Otmar Alt was a limited-edition model, with only 1,000 units produced. It showcased various artworks by the artist Otmar Alt and featured a fully customized interior adorned with matching graphics.

=== Rabbit ===
The Golf 3 Rabbit Edition was exclusive to Austria and featured a distinctive rabbit badge.

=== Cool ===
The Golf Cool was marked by a "Cool" sticker, similar to the Avenue edition, and included several minor design modifications.

=== CitySTROMer ===
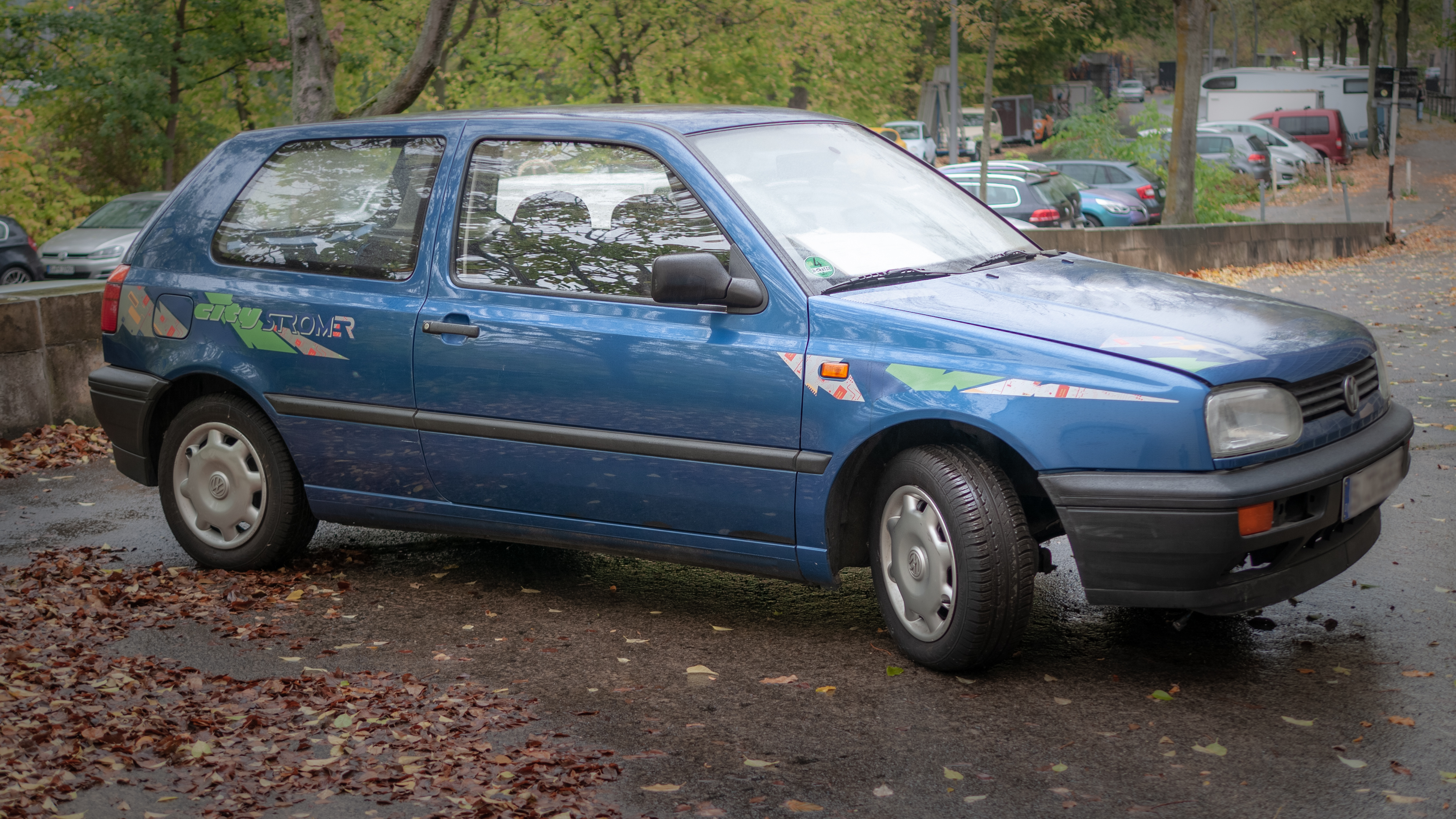
Golf CitySTROMer

The Golf CitySTROMer was an alternative electric powered version of the Golf 3, characterized by vibrant graphics displayed on its side panels.

=== Highline ===
As its name implies, the Golf Highline represented the premium, high-end variant of the Mk3 Golf. This edition featured a full leather interior, wood accents, and prominently displayed a "Highline" sticker on the trunk.

=== Coast ===
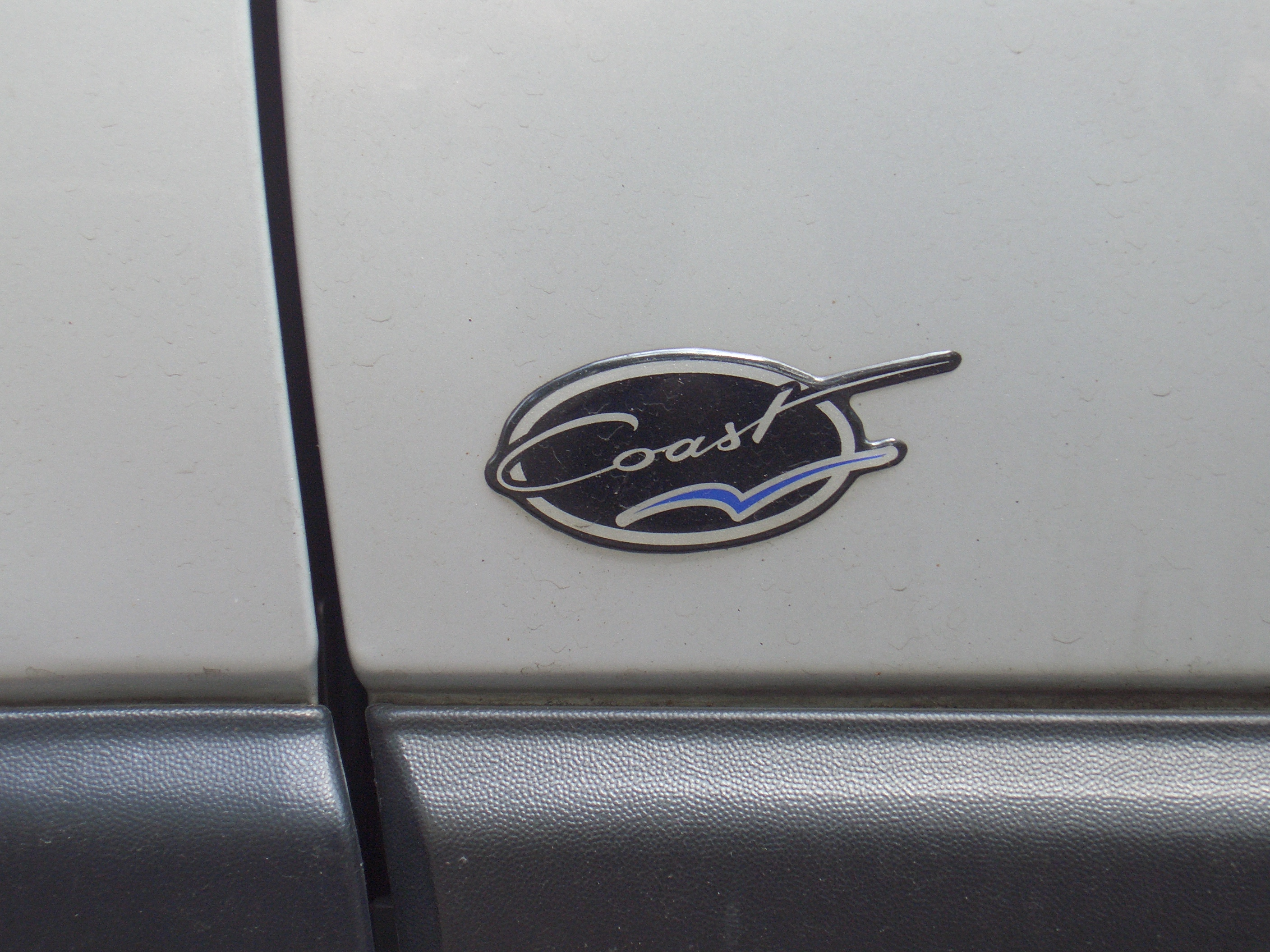
Coast Badge

The Golf Coast was a limited edition exclusive to the Cabrio model, distinguished by the "Coast" graphic displayed on the trunk.

=== Sport ===
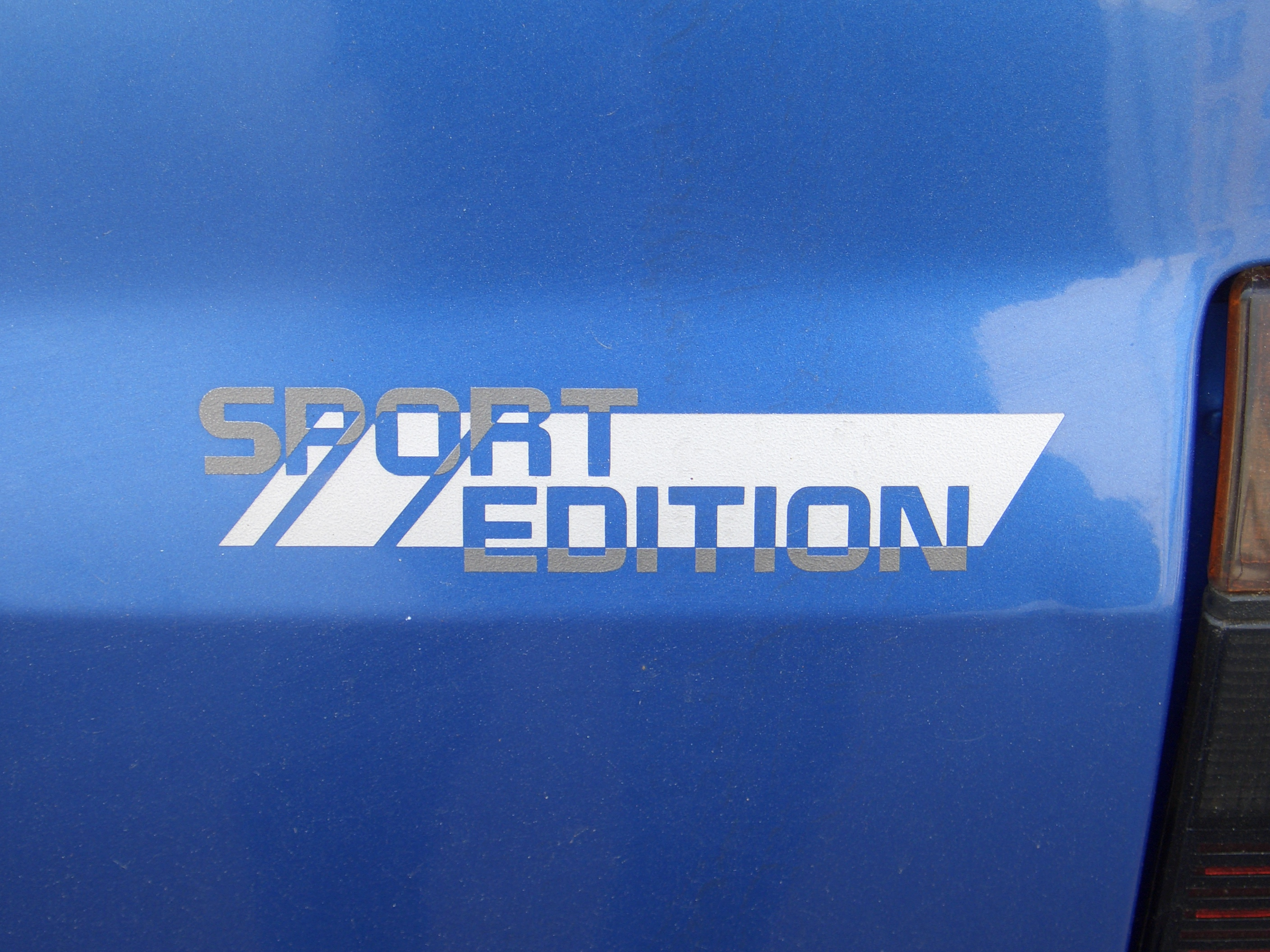
Sport Edition Badge

The Sport edition, true to its name, represented the sporty variant of the Golf 3. It prominently featured a "Sport Edition" sticker, highlighting its performance-oriented character.

=== Classic ===
The Golf Classic featured a distinctly retro design and included a "Classic Edition" silicone badge, enhancing its vintage appeal.

=== Limited ===
Similar to the "Edition" variant of the Golf 4 Variant, this model was equipped with a range of special features and included a "Limited Edition" graphic on the interior step, presented in a matching font.

=== GTI / VR6 Edition ===
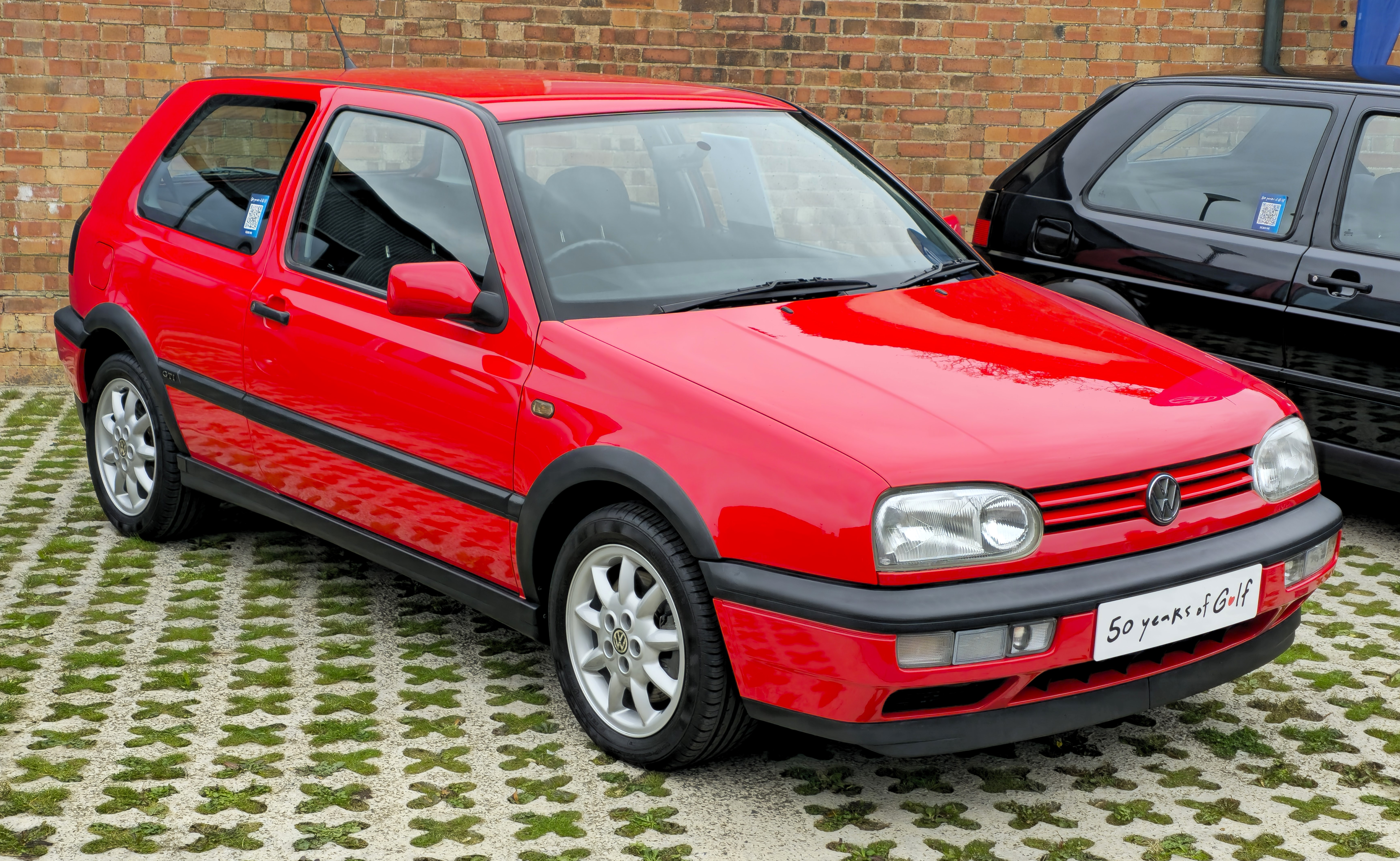
Golf GTI

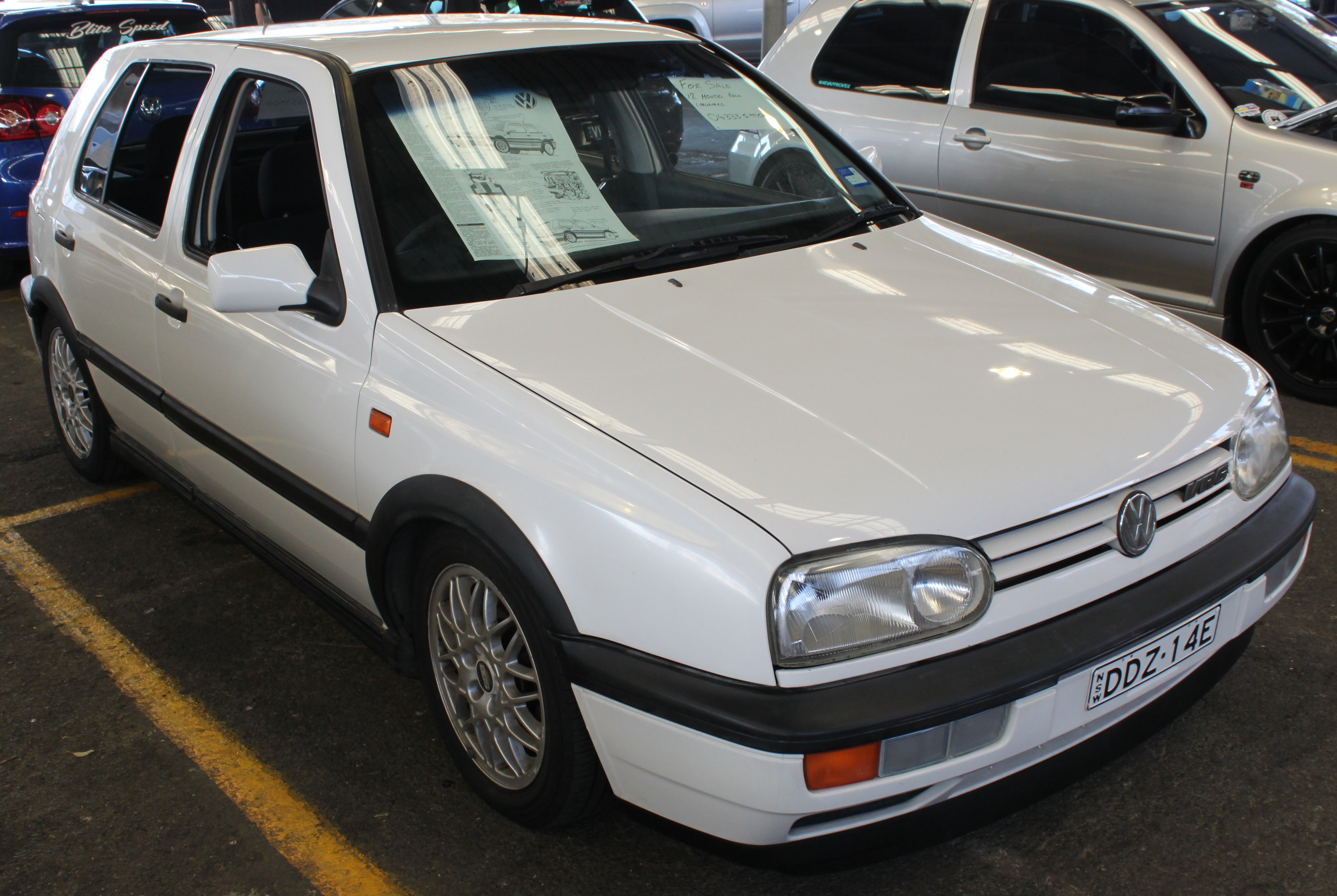
Golf VR6

The GTI/VR6 Edition models were distinguished by their respective body kits and featured "GTI/VR6 Edition" badges on the sides. The GTI Edition additionally showcased a sticker on the rear quarter panel, designed to match the font used on the interior seats.

=== Kamei ===
The "Kamei Edition" was a limited-edition model produced in collaboration with Kamei, an aftermarket body parts manufacturer based in Wolfsburg. This edition featured the complete Kamei body kit and included a distinctive "Kamei Edition" badge, positioned on the right side of the grille.

=== Ryder ===
The Ryder edition included several minor design modifications; however, it did not come equipped with a sunroof.

=== Driver's Edition GTI VR6 (North America) ===
The 1997 model year introduced the GTI Driver's Edition, available in two colors: Ginster Yellow and Jazz Blue. Distinctive features included red stitching on the steering wheel, a special shift knob designed with half aluminum and half leather, adorned with the GTI logo, and silver gauge faces. The vehicle was equipped with 15" seven-spoke alloy wheels manufactured by Speedline, complemented by red-painted brake calipers.

Many of the features offered as extras in the Driver's Edition became standard on the 1998 GTI VR6, leading to some confusion regarding the distinctions between the two models. To verify whether a vehicle is a Driver's Edition, one can consult the Vehicle Identification Number (VIN).

=== Henri Leconte ===
The Henri Leconte edition featured a leather interior with signed seats and included a distinctive sticker depicting a 3D ball breaking through the glass on the rear window.

=== Henri Lloyd Yachting ===
The Henri Lloyd Yachting edition, based on the GT model, included a special front lip, rear bumper extension, and a unique grille, along with a distinctive rear badge.

=== Driver ===
The Driver edition of the Golf 3, which was essentially a Golf 3, featuring the GTI body kit, complemented by "Orlando" alloy rims and a small trunk spoiler.

=== SE ===
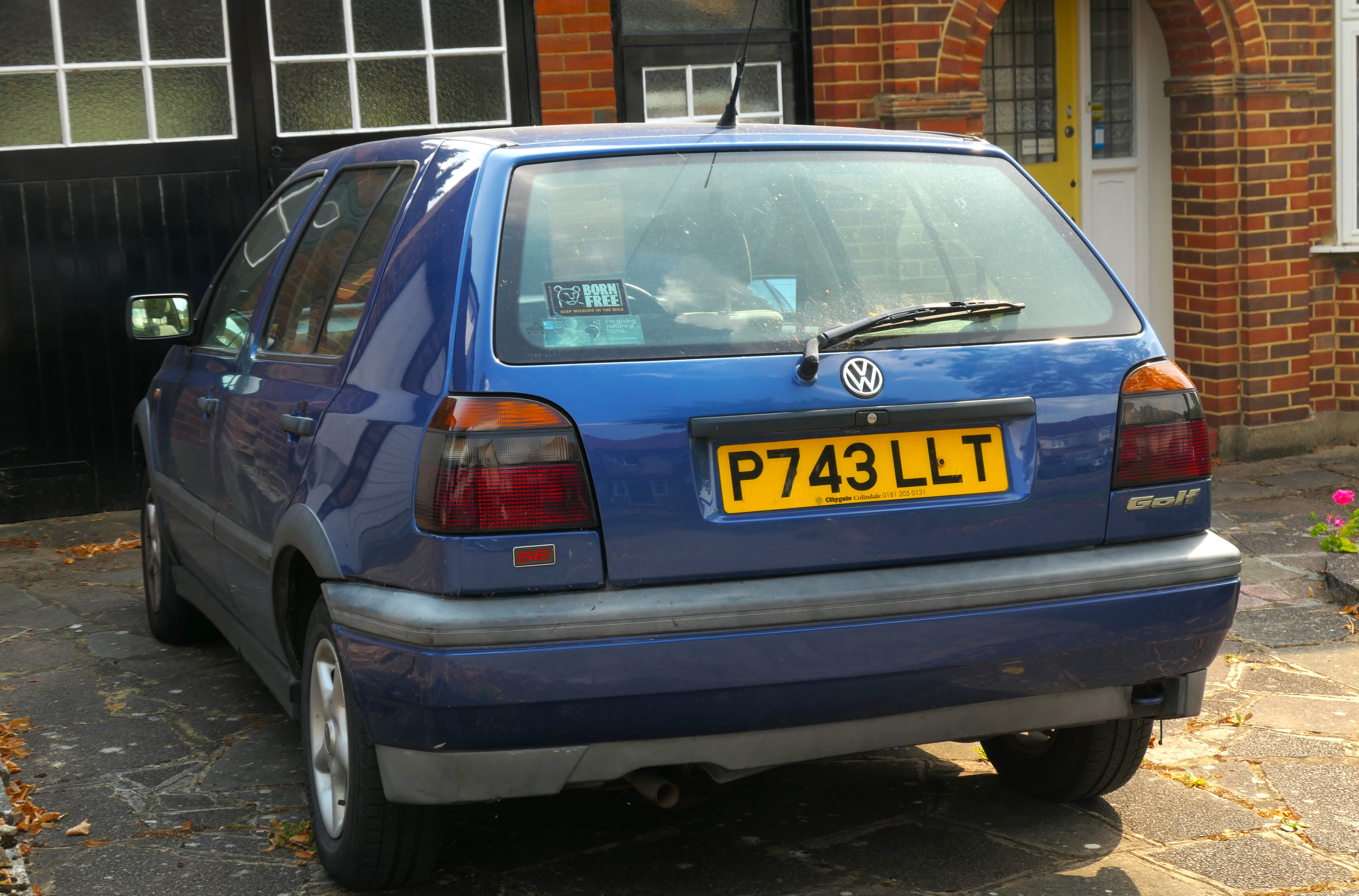
Golf SE, sold only in the United Kingdom

Produced from 1996 to 1997 for the UK market, the SE featured a GTI body-kit, all round tinted glass, clear front indicator covers, twin headlamp lenses and GTI taillights, silver instrument cluster and Sport Räder alloy wheels.

=== Match ===
The Match edition was equipped with a Sony CD player, power steering, and six-spoke rims. It also featured distinctive "Match" graphics, including "///Match" written on the sides near the front wheel arch and above the guard rail, along with three colored lines—blue, red, and green—below the right taillight.

=== Match II ===
The Match II edition retained the "Match" theme, featuring "Match II" graphics represented by a metallic badge positioned beneath the "Golf" and "TDI" logos. Additionally, it included a custom interior with a distinctive fabric design.

=== Colour Concept ===
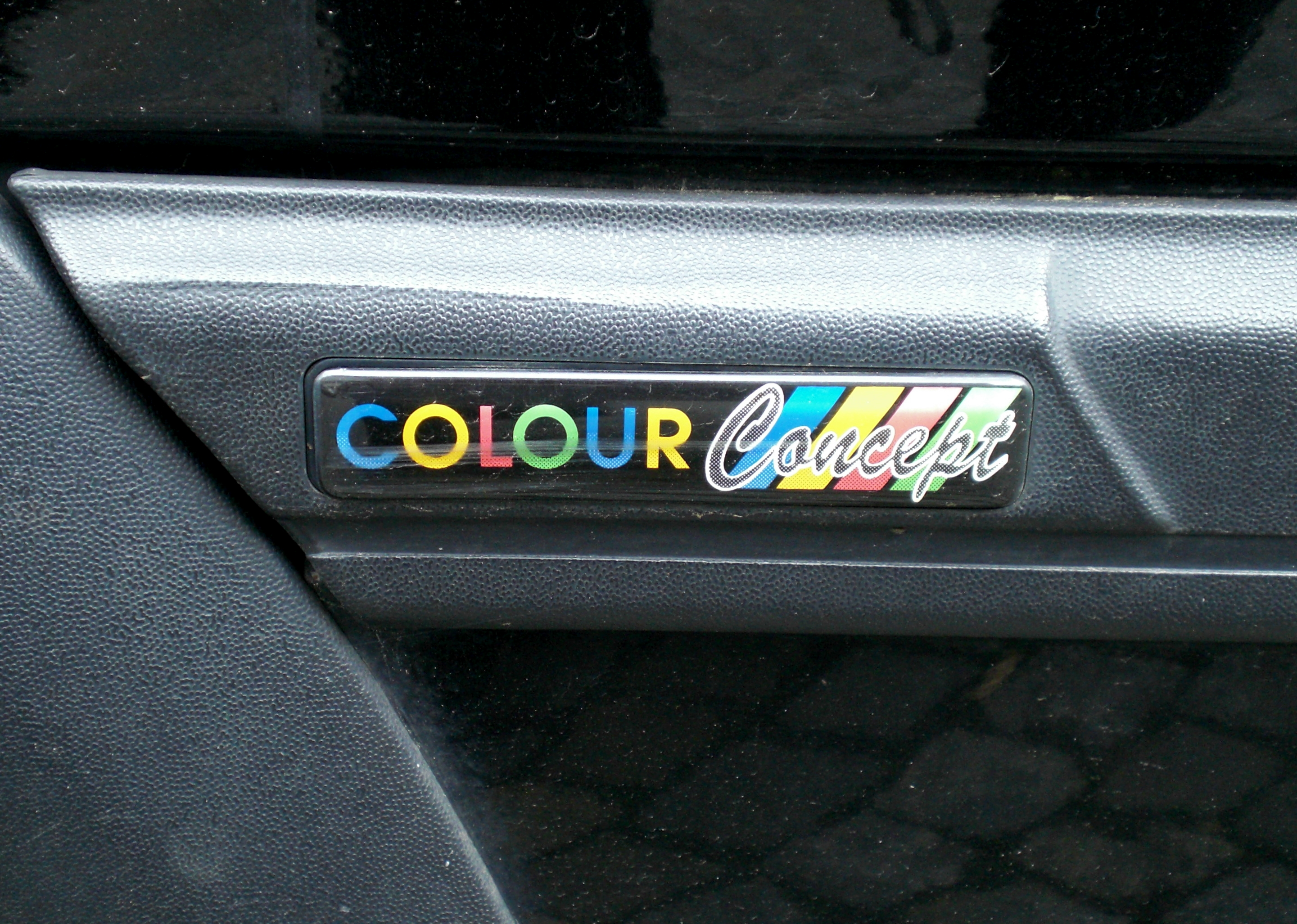
Colour Concept Badge

The Colour Concept edition was a highly limited release, produced in only five colors: Flash Red, Salsa Green, Yellow, Jazz Blue Pearl Effect, and Black Magic Pearl Effect, with only a few units of each color made. This edition featured a leather interior that matched the exterior color, complete with "Colour Concept" embossed on the front seats and a distinctive Colour Concept badge. It was equipped with 15-inch BBS Solitude alloy wheels, electric windows, central locking, and front seat heating. The Colour Concept was also available for the Cabriolet and Estate (Variant) versions of the Golf.

=== Family ===
The Family edition was essentially the standard Golf MK3, featuring only a custom sticker and a few minor differences.

=== Harlequin ===
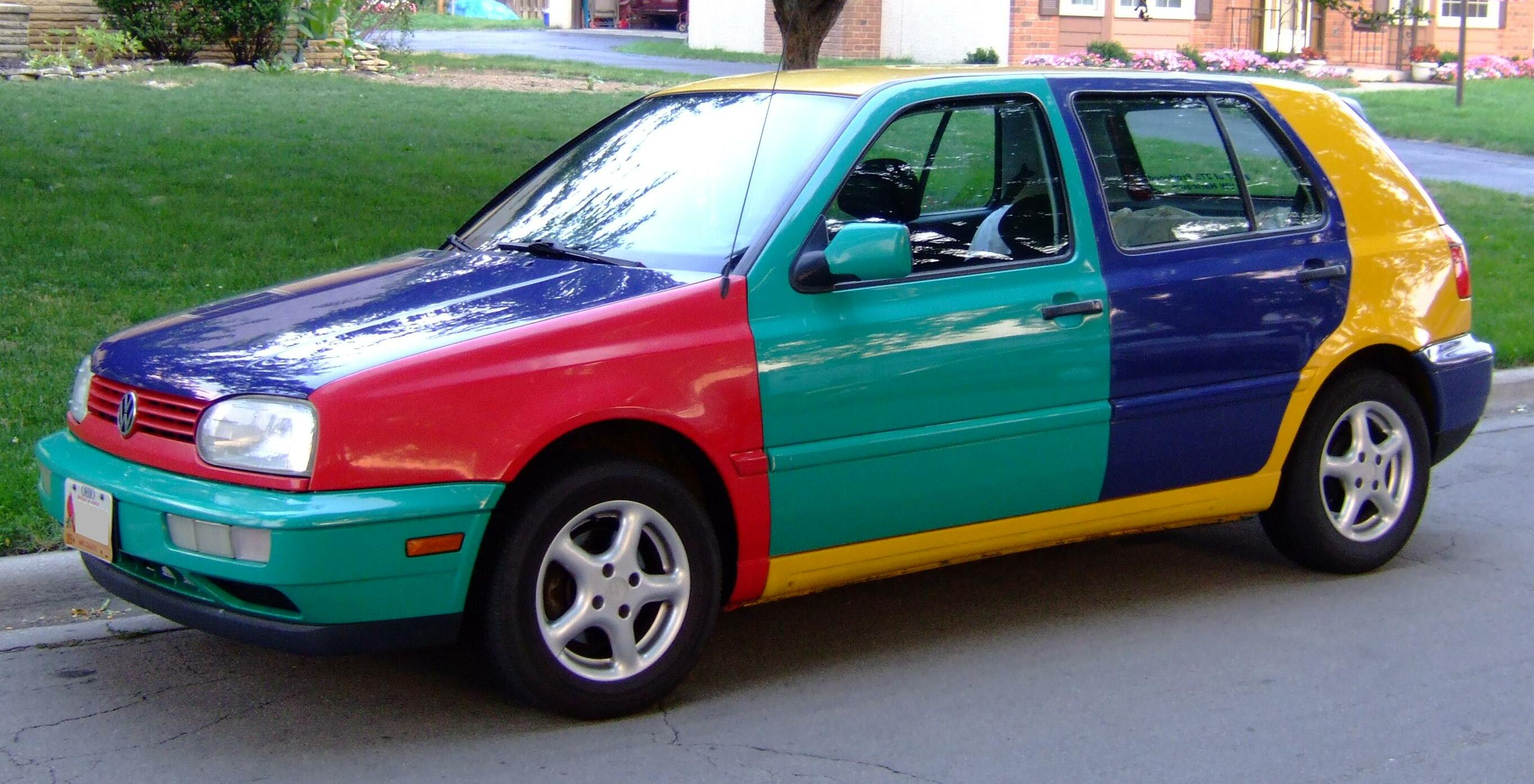
Golf Harlequin, Ginster Yellow (after its 'base' color)

The Golf Harlequin model began with a group of four cars, each carrying a Design Series emblem, created by Volkswagen to display on the 1995 international auto show circuit.

Basing the design on an earlier Volkswagen Polo Harlequin special edition, the Golf Harlequins were created in four variations, by taking four solid color models and interchanging the easily detachable doors, hood, hatch, grille, fenders and bumper facias — after final production at the Puebla, Mexico assembly plant where all the Harlequins were manufactured.

The interchangement of colors — Tornado Red, Ginster Yellow, Chagall Blue, and Pistachio Green — was not random, but followed four defined assignments, with each pattern avoiding adjacent major panels sharing the same paint color.

Chagall Blue, and Pistachio Green were otherwise unavailable as a Golf paint color choice in North America.

The resulting Harlequins were designated by their "base" color, the paint color of the welded panels comprising the core body — including the substructure, roof and C-pillar.

Following a positive response to the original four Harlequins, Volkswagen marketed an additional 60 — followed by another 200.

In a series of follow up letters to various entities at Volkswagen, the total number of Harlequins is reported variously from 275 to 264, all offered solely for model year 1996, in the United States, Canada, and Mexico — with most marketed in the United States.

Each Harlequin Golf featured a gray/black interior highlighting the four body colors. The special edition was available for an additional $150 over their stock counterparts.

=== TREK / K2 Editions ===
In 1997, a marketing collaboration with TREK was expanded to include the Golf Mk3, resulting in the TREK edition. This variant featured a roof bike carrier, a 21-speed purple TREK-Volkswagen branded mountain bike, and a TREK "Limited Edition" badge.

Also introduced in 1997 was the K2 edition, which came equipped with a ski/snowboard roof carrier, a K2 "Limited Edition" badge, and the option of either a pair of K2 El Camino skis or a K2 Juju snowboard.

Both the TREK and K2 editions included special Recaro-manufactured seats, 14-inch alloy wheels, tinted taillights, unique "TREK" or "K2" shift knobs, an optional moonroof, a roof-mounted antenna, and fog lights.

=== Wolfsburg Edition ===
The Wolfsburg Edition of the Golf Mk3 was produced alongside the Wolfsburg Edition Jetta in the United States. This variant featured an enhanced white/tan dual-tone interior, smoked tail lamps, premium alloy wheels, remote entry, power windows and mirrors, and a tilt/slide sunroof as standard. The Wolfsburg Edition was exclusively available with the VW 8-valve SOHC 2.0L engine.

=== European tour editions ===
During the 1990s, Volkswagen sponsored three high-profile rock bands' European tours, and issued a special-edition Golf, with distinctive exterior markings, for each: the Golf Pink Floyd Edition (1994), the Golf Rolling Stones Edition (1995), and the Golf Bon Jovi Edition (1996).

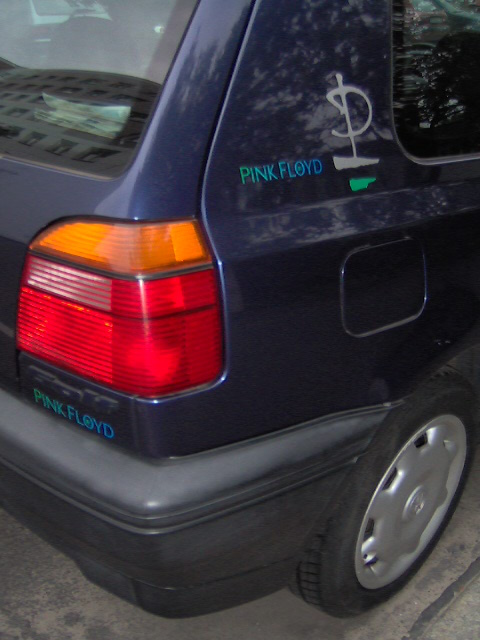
Pink Floyd

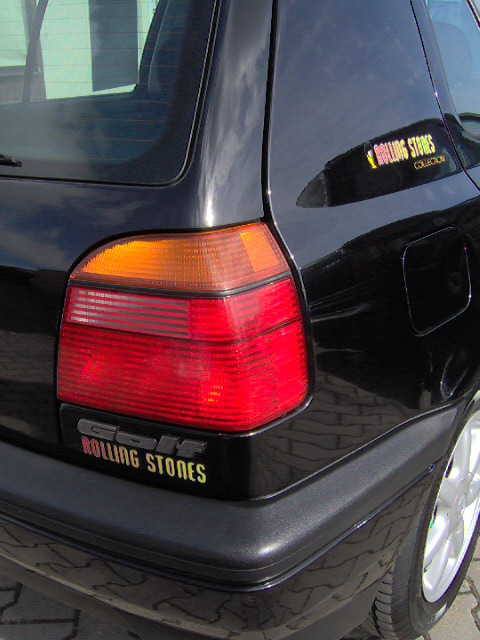
Rolling Stones

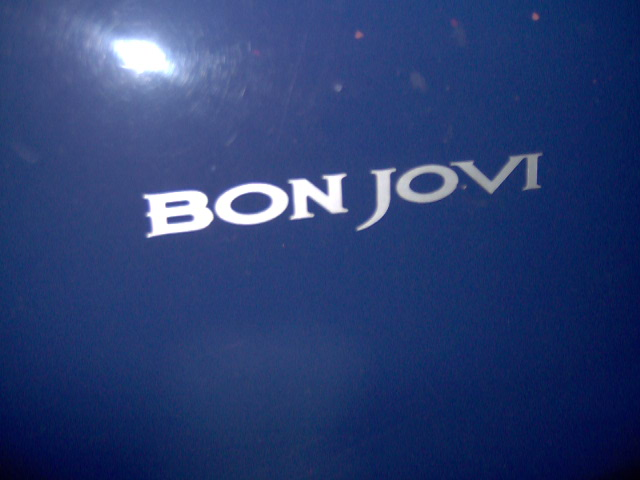
Bon Jovi

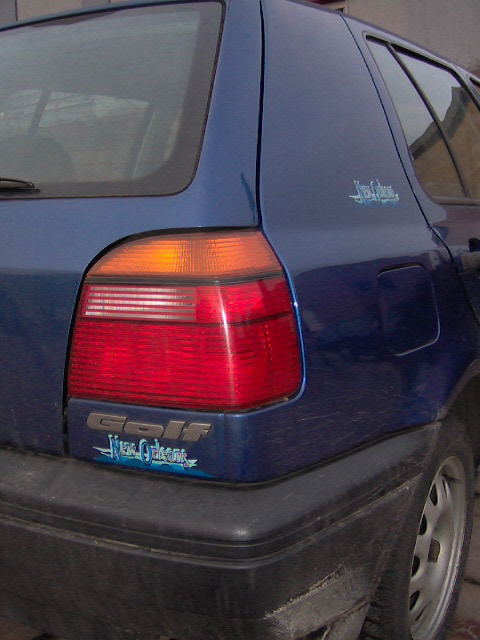
New Orleans

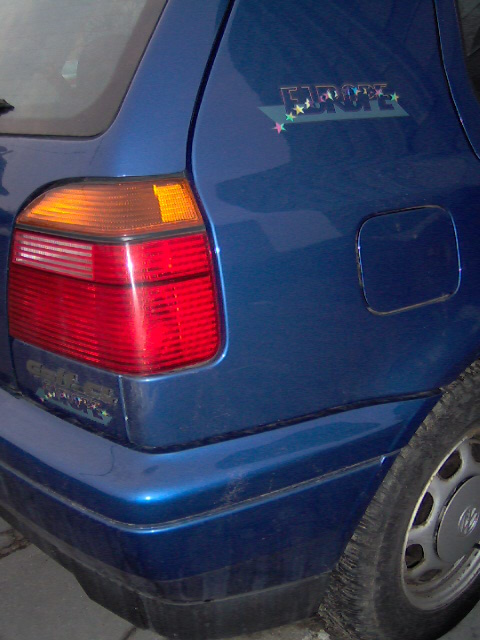
Europe

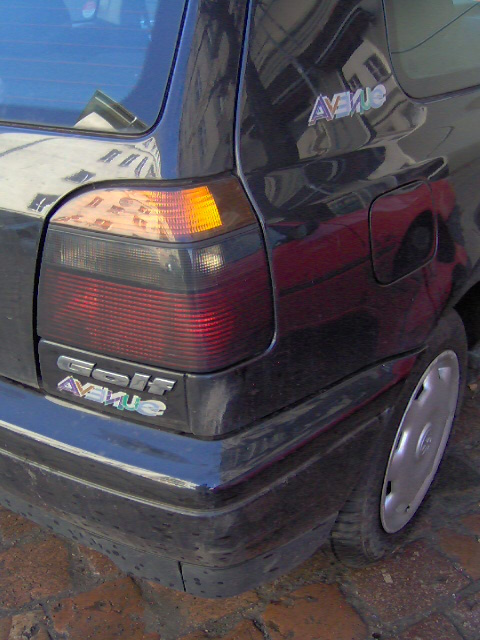
Avenue

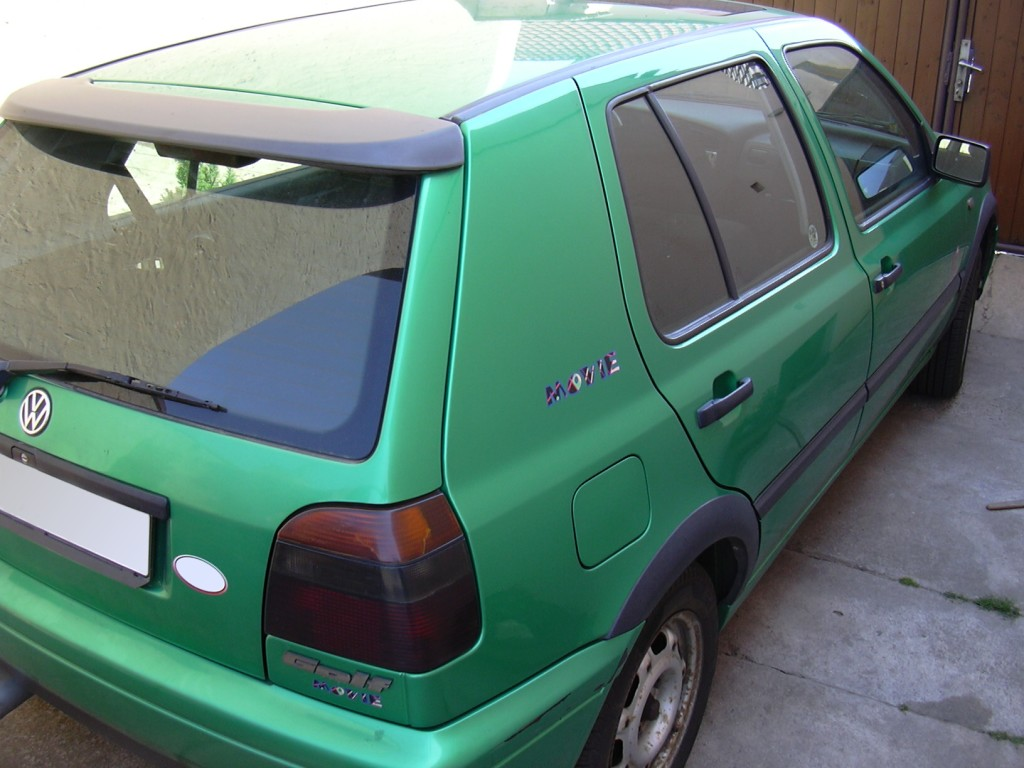
Movie

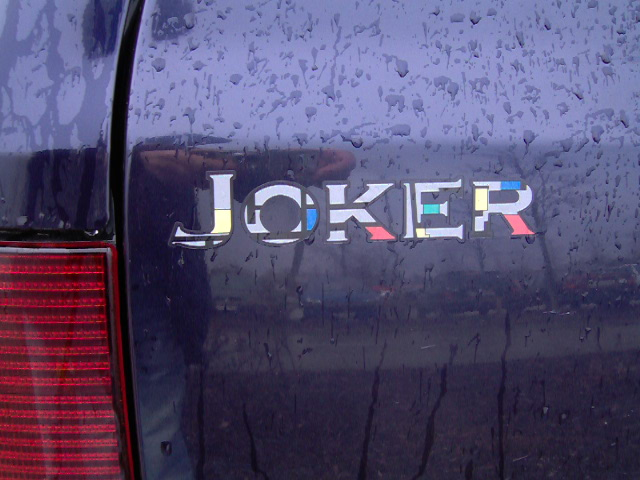
Joker

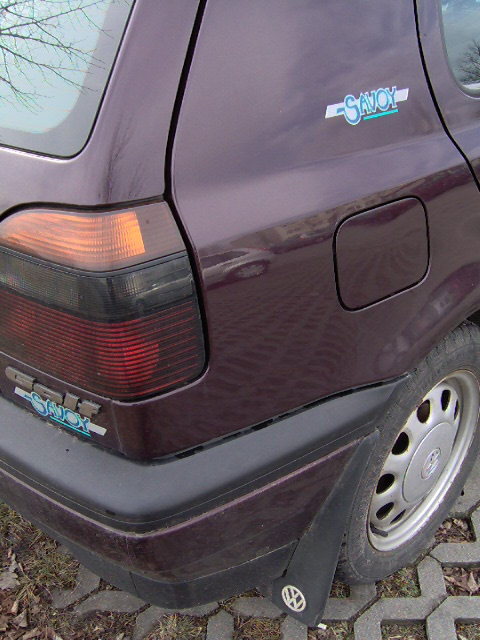
Savoy

Special

== European Car of the Year ==
The Golf MK3 was voted European Car of the Year for 1992 - the first Volkswagen to win this award.

== Engine choices ==
Name	Volume	Engine	Fuel	Power (max.)	Torque (max.)	Model	0-100 km/h (0-62 mph) (s)	Top speed	Years
1.4	1391cc	I4	Petrol	60 PS (44 kW; 59 hp) at 5200 rpm	107 N⋅m (79 lb⋅ft) at 2800−3200 rpm	ABD	16.3	157 km/h (98 mph)	1992−1995
1.4	1390cc	I4	Petrol	60 PS (44 kW; 59 hp) at 4700 rpm	116 N⋅m (86 lb⋅ft) at 2800−3200 rpm	AEX/APQ	15.9	158 km/h (98 mph)	1995−1997
1.6	1598cc	I4	Petrol	75 PS (55 kW; 74 hp) at 5200 rpm	125 N⋅m (92 lb⋅ft) at 3400 rpm	ABU		168 km/h (104 mph)	1992−1994
1.6	1598cc	I4	Petrol	75 PS (55 kW; 74 hp) at 5200 rpm	126 N⋅m (93 lb⋅ft) at 2600 rpm	AEA		168 km/h (104 mph)	1994−1995
1.6	1598cc	I4	Petrol	75 PS (55 kW; 74 hp) at 4800 rpm	135 N⋅m (100 lb⋅ft) at 2800−3600 rpm	AEE	13.4	168 km/h (104 mph)	1995−1997
1.6	1595cc	I4	Petrol	101 PS (74 kW; 100 hp) at 5800 rpm	135 N⋅m (100 lb⋅ft) at 4400 rpm	AEK		188 km/h (117 mph)	1994−1995
1.6	1595cc	I4	Petrol	101 PS (74 kW; 100 hp) at 5800 rpm	140 N⋅m (103 lbf⋅ft) at 3500 rpm	AFT/AKS	11.2	188 km/h (117 mph)	1995−1997
1.8	1781cc	I4	Petrol	75 PS (55 kW; 74 hp) at 5000 rpm	140 N⋅m (103 lbf⋅ft) at 2500 rpm	AAM/ANN	14.2	168 km/h (104 mph)	1992−1997
1.8	1781cc	I4	Petrol	90 PS (66 kW; 89 hp) at 5500 rpm	145 N⋅m (107 lb⋅ft) at 2500 rpm	ABS/ADZ/ANP/ACC	12.1	178 km/h (111 mph)	1992−1997
2.0 GTI	1984cc	I4	Petrol	118 PS (87 kW; 116 hp) at 5400 rpm	166 N⋅m (122 lb⋅ft) at 3200 rpm	2E/ABA/ADY/AGG	9.7	210 km/h (130 mph)	1992−1997
2.0 GTI 16V	1984cc	I4	Petrol	152 PS (112 kW; 150 hp) at 6000 rpm	180 N⋅m (133 lbf⋅ft) at 4600 rpm	ABF	8.1	225 km/h (140 mph)	1993−1997
2.8 VR6	2792cc	VR6	Petrol	176 PS (129 kW; 174 hp) at 5800 rpm	235 N⋅m (173 lb⋅ft) at 4200 rpm	AAA	7.5	240 km/h (149 mph)	1992−1998
2.9 VR6	2861cc	VR6	Petrol	190 PS (140 kW; 187 hp) at 5800 rpm	245 N⋅m (181 lb⋅ft) at 4200 rpm	ABV	6.7	250 km/h (155 mph)	1994−1997
1.9 D	1896cc	I4	Diesel	64 PS (47 kW; 63 hp) at 4400 rpm	124 N⋅m (91 lb⋅ft) at 2000−3000 rpm	1Y	17.6	156 km/h (97 mph)	1992−1997
1.9 SDI	1896cc	I4	Diesel	64 PS (47 kW; 63 hp) at 4200 rpm	125 N⋅m (92 lb⋅ft) at 2200−2800 rpm	AEY	17.6	156 km/h (97 mph)	1995−1997
1.9 TD	1896cc	I4	Diesel	75 PS (55 kW; 74 hp) at 4200 rpm	150 N⋅m (111 lbf⋅ft) at 2400−3400 rpm	AAZ	15.1	165 km/h (103 mph)	1992−1997
1.9 TDI	1896cc	I4	Diesel	90 PS (66 kW; 89 hp) at 4000 rpm	202 N⋅m (149 lb⋅ft) at 1900 rpm	1Z	12.5	178 km/h (111 mph)	1993−1996
1.9 TDI	1896cc	I4	Diesel	90 PS (66 kW; 89 hp) at 4000 rpm	202 N⋅m (149 lbf⋅ft) at 1900 rpm	AHU	12.5	178 km/h (111 mph)	1996−1997
1.9 TDI	1896cc	I4	Diesel	110 PS (81 kW; 108 hp) at 4150 rpm	235 N⋅m (173 lb⋅ft) at 1900 rpm	AFN	11.0	193 km/h (120 mph)	1996−1997

== See also ==
- Volkswagen A platform
- Volkswagen Golf
- VDub
- List of discontinued Volkswagen Group petrol engines
- List of discontinued Volkswagen Group diesel engines
- Hot hatch
- Small family car

Preceded by Volkswagen Golf Mk2	Volkswagen Golf Mk3; 1992–2002	Succeeded by Volkswagen Golf Mk4
