= 1991 in German television =

This is a list of German television related events from 1991.

== Events ==
- 21 March - Atlantis 2000 are selected to represent Germany at the 1991 Eurovision Song Contest with their song "Dieser Traum darf niemals sterben". They are selected to be the thirty-sixth German Eurovision entry during Ein Lied für Rom held at the Friedrichstadt-Palast in Berlin.

== Debuts ==
=== International ===
- 1 January - (United Kingdom) Mr. Bean (1990–1995) (SWR Fernsehen)
- 5 January - (United States) Chip 'n Dale: Rescue Rangers (1989–1990) (Das Erste)
- 5 January - (France) Spiff and Hercules (1989–1991) (RTLplus)
- 7 January - (United States) / (Canada) Beetlejuice (1989–1991) (Sat. 1)
- 23 February - (United States) The Super Mario Bros. Super Show! (1989) (RTL)
- 8 June - (United States) Garfield and Friends (1988–1994) (ZDF)
- 10 September - (United States) Twin Peaks (1990–91, 2017) (RTLplus)
- 13 September - (United States) The Simpsons (1989–present) (ZDF)
- 21 December - (United States) The Tom and Jerry Kids Show (1990–1993) (RTLplus)

=== Armed Forces Network ===
- (United States) Captain Planet and the Planeteers (1990–1996)
- (United States) / (South Korea) Widget (1990–1991)
- (United States) Tiny Toon Adventures (1990–1992)
- (United States) / (France) Bucky O'Hare and the Toad Wars (1991)
- (United States) Harry and the Hendersons (1991–1993)
- (United States) Clarissa Explains It All (1991–1994)
- (United States) The Simpsons (1989–present)

=== BFBS ===
- 15 February - (United Kingdom) Five Children and It (1991)
- 22 February - (United Kingdom) Billy Webb's Amazing Stories (1991)
- 26 June - (United Kingdom) Finders Keepers (1991-1996, 2006)
- 27 June - (United Kingdom) The Real McCoy (1991–1996)
- 28 June - (Australia) The Girl from Tomorrow (1990)
- 16 September - (United Kingdom) Victor and Hugo (1991–1992)
- 4 November - (United Kingdom) Time Riders (1991)
- 5 November - (United Kingdom) / (Canada) Rupert (1991–1997)
- 7 November - (United States) The Legend of Prince Valiant (1991–1993)
- 16 November - (United Kingdom) Watt on Earth (1991–1992)
- 30 December - (United Kingdom) / (United States) Captain Zed and the Zee Zone (1991–1993)
- (United Kingdom) Grotbags (1991–1993)
- (United Kingdom) Forget Me Not Farm (1990–1991)
- (United Kingdom) Radio Roo (1991–1993)
- (United Kingdom) Gordon the Gopher (1991)
- (United Kingdom) Dodgem (1991)

== Television shows ==
=== 1950s ===
- Tagesschau (1952–present)

=== 1960s ===
- heute (1963–present)

=== 1970s ===
- heute-journal (1978–present)
- Tagesthemen (1978–present)

=== 1980s ===
- Wetten, dass..? (1981–2014)
- Lindenstraße (1985–2020)

== Changes of network affiliation ==
=== Military broadcasting ===
| Title | Original Country | Former Network | New Network | Date |
|---|---|---|---|---|
| Tiny Toon Adventures | United States | Armed Forces Network | BFBS | 1991 |

== Networks and services ==
=== Launches ===
| Network | Type | Launch date | Notes | Source |
|---|---|---|---|---|
| Premiere | Cable television | February | | |
| Fernsehen aus Berlin | Cable television | 1 February | | |
