= European Car of the Year =

Automobile award

Car of the Year

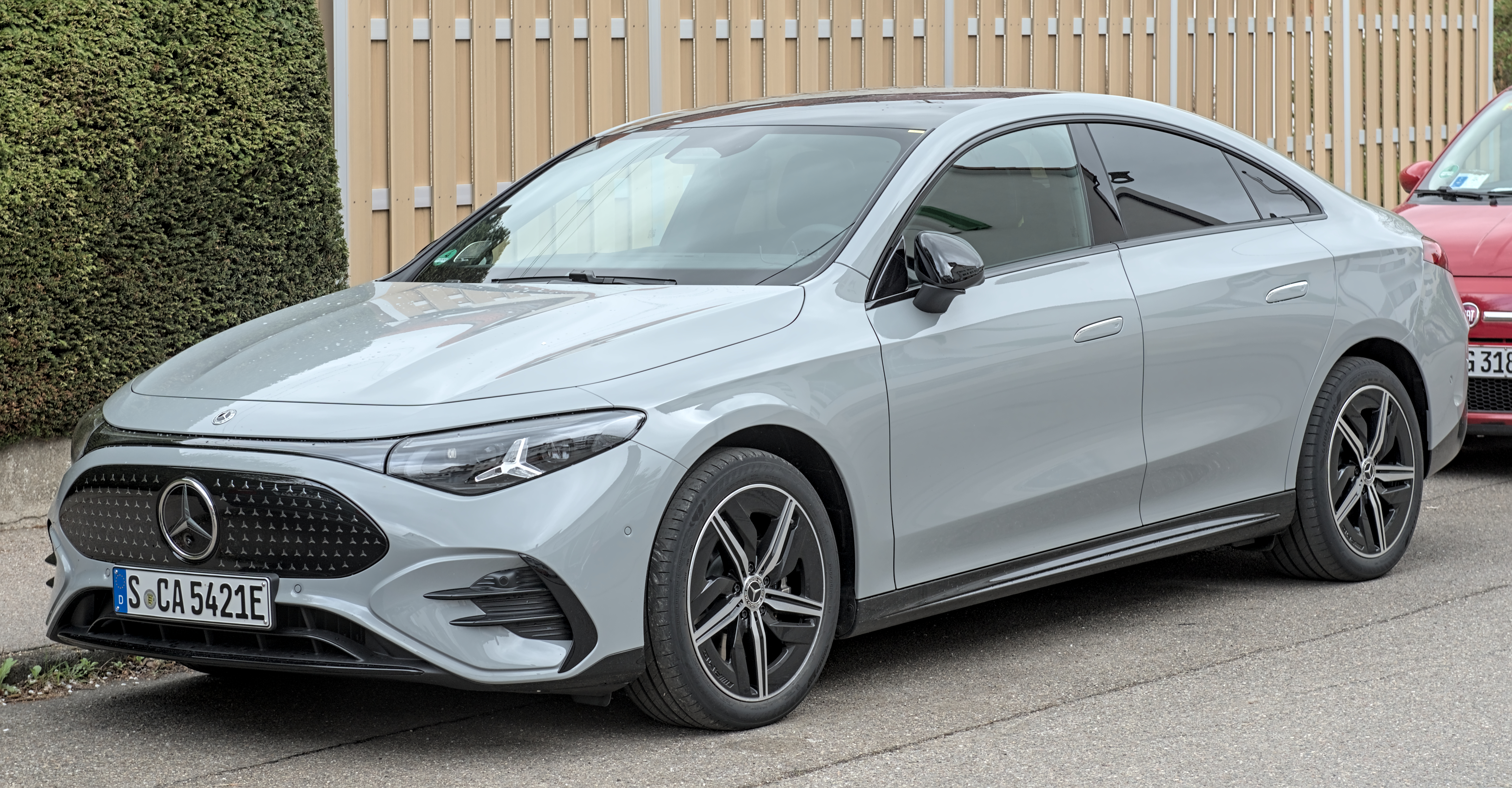
- 2026 winner, Mercedes-Benz CLA
- Formation: 1964
- Website: www.caroftheyear.org

The European Car of the Year award is an international Car of the Year award established in 1964 by a collective of automobile magazines from different countries in Europe. The current organising media of the award are Auto (Italy), Autocar (United Kingdom), Autopista (Spain), Autovisie (Netherlands), L'Automobile Magazine (France), Stern (Germany) and Vi Bilägare (Sweden).

The voting jury consists of motoring journalists from publications throughout Europe. Representation from each country is based on the size of the country's car market, and car manufacturing industry. There are no categories or class winners — the stated objective is to find a "single, decisive winner" among all competing cars. Since 1977, the jury gathers every late September at Hotel Tannishus in Tversted, Denmark to compare and test drive most of the eligible cars, an event also known as the Tannistest. Besides driving on public roads, the jury has the opportunity to do a moose test on Sindal Airport.

Fiat (9), Renault (8), Peugeot (6), Ford and Opel/Vauxhall (5), Volkswagen (4), Citroën and Toyota (3) were the brands most awarded. The 2026 European Car of the Year was announced on 9 January 2026, the winner being the Mercedes-Benz CLA.

== Current rules ==
Eligible cars are new models released in the twelve months prior to the award. The award is not restricted to European cars, but nominees must be available in at least five European countries, and have expected sales of 5,000 a year.

Nominees are judged on the following criteria: design, comfort, safety, economy, handling, performance, functionality, environmental requirements, driver satisfaction and price. Technical innovation and value for money are also important factors.

A shortlist of seven cars is selected by a simple vote. For the final round of voting, each jury member has 25 points to distribute among the finalists. The points must be distributed to at least five cars, with no more than ten to any one car, and no joint top marks. The voting is open, and each jury member provides published justification for their vote distribution.

Under these rules, the decisiveness of the victory has varied greatly. For example, in 1988, the Peugeot 405 won by 212 points, the biggest gap in the history of the European Car of the Year competition; such feat was repeated in 2013, as the Volkswagen Golf VII won by the same points gap. In 2010 the Volkswagen Polo won by a mere 10 points, received maximum points from 3 of the 60 jurors, and was the top choice of 25.

The Renault Clio (1991, 2006), Volkswagen Golf (1992, 2013), Opel/Vauxhall Astra (1985, 2016), Toyota Yaris (2000, 2021) and Renault Scénic (1997, 2024) are the only cars to have won the award more than once.

In 2011, the Nissan Leaf was the first electrically-powered vehicle to be awarded Car of the Year.

== Current jury ==
From 2024, the Car of The Year jury contains 60 journalists from 23 countries: six each from France, Germany, Italy, Spain and Great Britain, three from Austria, the Netherlands, Sweden, Switzerland, two from Belgium, Hungary, Poland, Portugal and one each from the Czech Republic, Denmark, Finland, Greece, Ireland, Luxembourg, Norway, Slovenia, Turkey and Romania.

In August 2024, it was announced that after almost 20 years, Romania once again has a member in the Car of The Year jury, Florin Micu, general editor of the Auto Expert, Auto Motor și Sport and Flote Auto magazines.

== Result ==
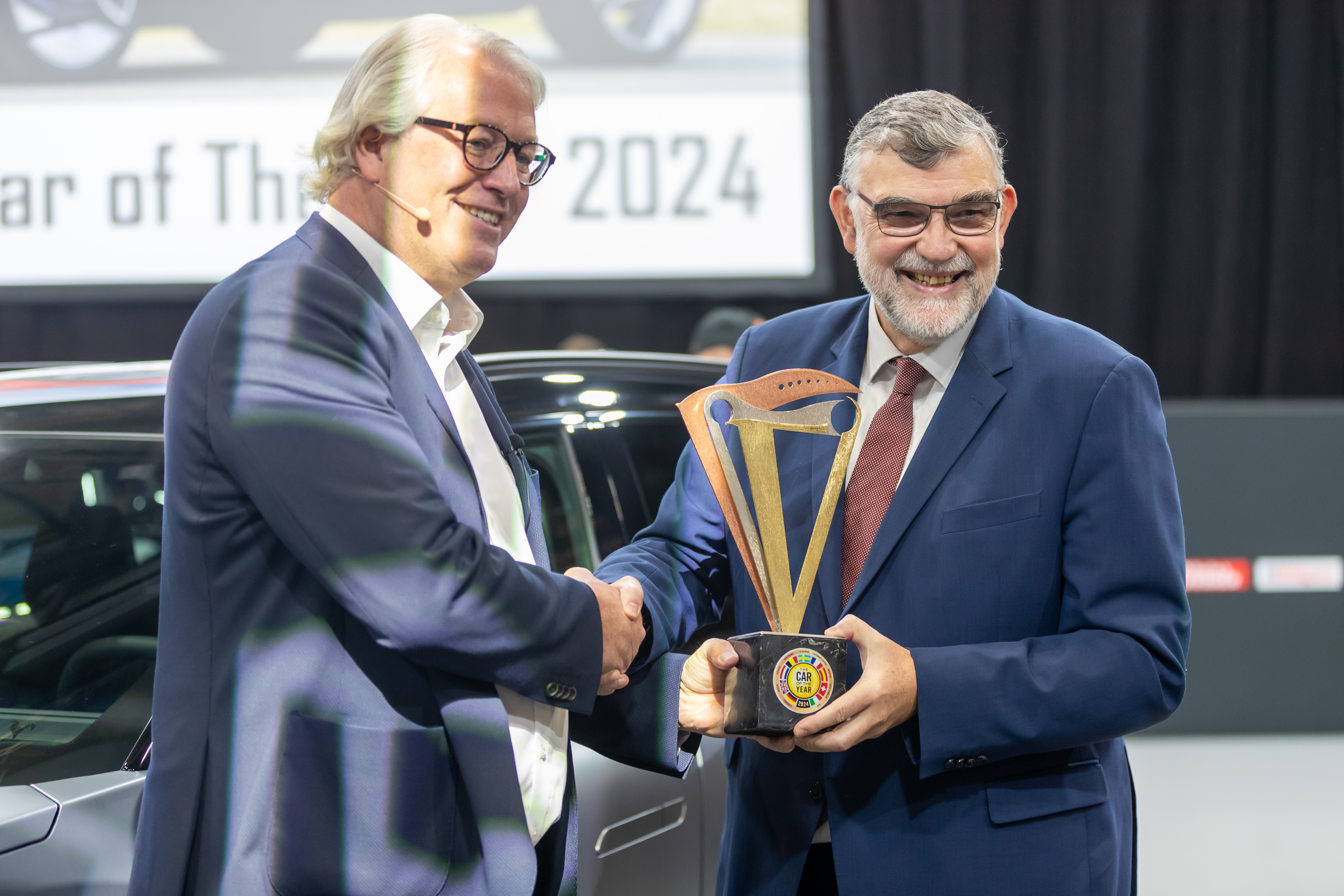
Renault COO Gilles Le Borgne receiving the European Car of the Year Award 2024 for the Scénic E-Tech

=== 1960s ===
British carmakers produced the first two winners of the award. The Rover 2000 saloon was the inaugural winner in 1964 while the Austin 1800 was victorious in 1965. The Rover won over another British contender, the rear-engine Hillman Imp.

The Renault 16 was France's first awarded car and won the award for 1966, having been launched at the beginning of 1965. A year later in 1967, the award went to the Fiat 124, which won more than twice as many as voted as its nearest competitor, the BMW 1600. Fiat missed out the following year 1968, however, when its 125 was pipped to the award by the revolutionary new NSU Ro 80, one of the first production cars to feature a rotary engine.

Peugeot claimed the accolade for the first time with the 1969 award, which was won by its saloon 504, a large family car which offered a high standard of interior comfort and build quality.

=== 1970s ===
The Fiat 128 was the next winner of the award in 1970, while a year in 1971 later the innovative new Citroën GS family saloon won the award.

Fiat became the first manufacturer to win the award for a third time when its supermini 127 won the 1972 title. The next winner of the award in 1973 was the Audi 80 and the 1974 award went to the Mercedes-Benz 450 SE.

Despite financial problems which led to its takeover by Peugeot that year, Citroën won the accolade in 1975 with its flagship saloon CX, which fought off a strong challenge from the highly acclaimed Volkswagen Golf. Then came Chrysler Europe's first winner of the award in 1976, the contemporary Simca 1307/1308. Despite all the strife which troubled British Leyland throughout the 1970s, the state-owned carmaker achieved recognition for 1977 when its Rover 3500 executive car won the award. This was the last time a British marque would win the contest (discounting the Vauxhall models which were badge engineered Opels) – until the Jaguar I-Pace took the crown in 2019.

Sports cars have traditionally accounted for only a tiny percentage of car sales throughout Europe, but the European Car of the Year accolade was won by one for 1978, when the Porsche 928 sealed the award in the face of competition from the BMW 7 Series and Ford Granada.

Just before the sale of its European division to Peugeot, Chrysler achieved a success second in the contest with its Horizon, which won the 1979 award ahead of one of its main rivals, Fiat Ritmo/Strada.

=== 1980s ===
Lancia finally achieved recognition a year later in 1980 when its stylish new hatchback Delta was voted European Car of the Year.

Ford finally achieved success in the contest when the Escort III, the first of that model line to feature front-wheel drive or a hatchback, sealed the award for 1981, fighting off competition from British Leyland's crucial supermini Austin Metro and the Fiat Panda. In 1982, the accolade was perhaps surprisingly won by the Renault 9, which managed to finish ahead of the more widely well regarded Opel Ascona C and the Volkswagen Polo II. The 1983 award was won by the Audi 100, which narrowly finished ahead of the slightly smaller and similarly aerodynamic Ford Sierra.

The 1984 award saw two new superminis finish well ahead of the nearest contenders. The Fiat Uno was Fiat's fourth success in the history of the award, finishing slightly ahead of the Peugeot 205. In 1985, General Motors finally achieved recognition when its latest version of the Opel Kadett/Vauxhall Astra sealed it. Ford achieved a second victory in the 1986 contest with its new flagship Scorpio/Granada. General Motors made it two victories in three years when its own flagship model, the Opel Omega/Vauxhall Carlton, won the award for 1987.

19 years after the 504 gave Peugeot its first European Car of the Year, the French carmaker finally enjoyed its second triumph in the competition when its mid-range saloon 405 won the 1988 award by a wide margin. In 1989, Fiat became the first manufacturer to win the award five times when its ground-breaking new Tipo achieved victory.

=== 1990s ===
Citroën's new flagship model XM won the award for 1990, with its French rival Renault scoring success a year later in 1991 with the new supermini Clio, which signalled the end for the iconic R5. With the award becoming nearly 30 years old, Volkswagen finally achieved recognition in 1992 when its Golf III won the award, finishing ahead of its two most important rivals – the Opel/Vauxhall Astra and Citroën ZX.

A non-European brand – with a British-built product – won the award for the first time for 1993, when the Nissan Micra earned top marks ahead of the Fiat Cinquecento (a car which helped the popularity of city cars in Europe to soar over the next few years) and Renault's new flagship, the Safrane.

Ford achieved a third success in the competition with its Mondeo, successor to the Sierra, winning the award for 1994. Fiat increased its number of victories in the contest to six, when its new supermini Punto won the award for 1995, just as its ancestors 127 (1972) and Uno (1984) had done many years earlier. Fiat won the award two years in a row in 1996, when its Bravo and Brava range pipped the stylish Peugeot 406 to the honour.

Renault's innovative compact MPV, the Mégane Scénic, won the European Car of the Year and Japan Import Car of the Year for 1997, while the Fiat subsidiary Alfa Romeo won the next year's award for the first time with its mid-range sports saloon 156 in 1998.

Ford achieved a fourth success in the contest when its boldly-styled Focus won the 1999 award, fighting off competition from the latest Opel/Vauxhall Astra and the Peugeot 206.

=== 2000s ===
In 2000, a Japanese manufacturer – this time with a Japanese-built product – won the award when the Toyota Yaris and Yaris Verso earned top marks in Car of the Year Japan and European Car of the Year ahead of the boldly-styled Fiat Multipla and the practical Opel/Vauxhall Zafira.

Alfa Romeo's modern revival continued when its stylish hatchback 147 won the award for 2001, with the next winner in 2002 being the Peugeot 307. It was another French success for 2003, when the Renault Mégane II was the winner.

Fiat achieved its eighth success in the contest when its all-new Panda won the 2004 award. Toyota made it two victories from five years when its radical Prius hybrid won the 2005 award. The Renault Clio became the first model to win the award twice when the third generation of the popular supermini won it for 2006, having previously won in 1991.

Ford's stylish and practical S-Max won the 2007 award, fighting off a close challenge from the Opel/Vauxhall Corsa, earlier versions of which had been largely overlooked by the contest's judges.

Fiat made in nine victories in the contest when it won the 2008 award with the 500 model, a retro-styled take on its iconic small car which had first been launched 50 years earlier. In 2009, the next award went to a more traditional and mainstream offering, when Opel/Vauxhall won the award for only the third time with its Insignia.

=== 2010s ===
The Volkswagen Polo supermini had been around in several forms since its launch in the mid-1970s, but the Polo V launched in 2009 was the first generation of Polo to win the award in 2010 and the second Volkswagen model to win the award.

Then came two years of success for battery electric cars, with the British-built Nissan Leaf and United States-built Opel/Vauxhall Ampera/Chevrolet Volt winning the 2011 and 2012 award respectively.

The Volkswagen Golf (having previously won in 1992) then joined the Renault Clio with the distinction of two wins in the contest when the Golf VII won the 2013 award. One of the Golf's key rivals, the Peugeot 308, was the next winner in 2014. In 2015, the Volkswagen Passat was awarded. In 2016, the Opel/Vauxhall Astra, another key rival to the Golf, became the third automobile to win the award twice, having previously won in 1985.

In 2017, Peugeot won fifth time with the 3008, marking the first time an SUV winning the award.

The 2018 winner is for a Swedish manufacturer for the first time in the history of the competition, with the Volvo XC40 winning.

For the first time in the awards' history, the Jaguar I-Pace and Alpine A110 both scored a tie with 250 points. Therefore, the winner had to be determined by the number of first place votes. The 2019 winner was the Jaguar with 18 votes compared to the Alpine with 16 votes. This mark the first time Jaguar wins the award, despite Jaguar's retail sales worldwide started to decline since 2019.

=== 2020s ===
In 2020, the Peugeot 208 won the award at the 2020 Geneva Motor Show, despite the 2020 event cancellation due to the COVID-19 pandemic and Switzerland's decision to impose a limit on gatherings of over 1,000 people.

For first time in ten years, the 2021 award was not announced at the Geneva Motor Show, again due to the event cancellation because of the pandemic and this continued for the next two consecutive years. The 2021 winner was the Toyota Yaris becoming the fourth model to win the award twice, having previously won in 2000.

Kia's first model under their EV nomenclature system for battery electric cars, the EV6, won the 2022 award, marking the first time in history a Korean manufacturer winning the award. The next winner in 2023 was the Jeep Avenger, marketed primarily for the European market and mark the first time Jeep wins the award.

In 2024, the award was held for the final time at the Geneva Motor Show before the event cancellation indefinitely. The 2024 winner was the Renault Scenic E-Tech become the fifth model to win the award twice, having previously won in 1997. Although, the Scenic E-Tech is a battery electric crossover SUV, compared to the 1997 winner being an MPV powered by internal combustion engines. Since the cancellation of the Geneva Motor Show, the next year winner was announced at the Brussels Motor Show. The 2025 winner was the Renault 5 E-Tech, therefore Renault won the award for the second year in a row. The 2026 winner was the Mercedes-Benz CLA, became the second Mercedes-Benz to win the award.

== Full list ==
- 1964–2000

European Car of the Year
Year	Winner	Points	Second place	Points	Third place	Points
1964	Rover 2000	76	Mercedes-Benz 600	64	Hillman Imp	31
1965	Austin 1800	78	Autobianchi Primula	51	Ford Mustang	18
1966	Renault 16	98	Rolls-Royce Silver Shadow	81	Oldsmobile Toronado	59
1967	Fiat 124	144	BMW 1600	69	Jensen FF	61
1968	NSU Ro 80	197	Fiat 125	133	Simca 1100	94
1969	Peugeot 504	119	BMW 2500/2800	77	Alfa Romeo 1750	76
1970	Fiat 128	235	Autobianchi A112	96	Renault 12	79
1971	Citroën GS	233	Volkswagen K70	121	Citroën SM	105
1972	Fiat 127	239	Renault 15/17	107	Mercedes-Benz 350 SL	96
1973	Audi 80	114	Renault 5	109	Alfa Romeo Alfetta	95
1974	Mercedes-Benz 450SE	115	Fiat X1/9	99	Honda Civic	90
1975	Citroën CX	229	Volkswagen Golf	164	Audi 50	136
1976	Simca 1307-1308	192	BMW 3 Series	144	Renault 30	107
1977	Rover 3500	157	Audi 100	138	Ford Fiesta	135
1978	Porsche 928	261	BMW 7 Series	231	Ford Granada	203
1979	Simca-Chrysler Horizon	251	Fiat Ritmo	239	Audi 80	181
1980	Lancia Delta	369	Opel Kadett	301	Peugeot 505	199
1981	Ford Escort III	326	Fiat Panda	308	Austin Metro	255
1982	Renault 9	335	Opel Ascona	304	Volkswagen Polo II	252
1983	Audi 100	410	Ford Sierra	386	Volvo 760	157
1984	Fiat Uno	346	Peugeot 205	325	Volkswagen Golf II	156
1985	Opel Kadett (Vauxhall Astra)	326	Renault 25	261	Lancia Thema	191
1986	Ford Scorpio (Ford Granada)	337	Lancia Y10	291	Mercedes-Benz 200-300E	273
1987	Opel Omega (Vauxhall Carlton)	275	Audi 80	238	BMW 7 Series	175
1988	Peugeot 405	464	Citroën AX	252	Honda Prelude	234
1989	Fiat Tipo	356	Opel Vectra	261	Volkswagen Passat	194
1990	Citroën XM	390	Mercedes-Benz SL	215	Ford Fiesta	214
1991	Renault Clio	312	Nissan Primera	258	Opel Calibra	183
1992	Volkswagen Golf	276	Opel Astra	231	Citroën ZX	213
1993	Nissan Micra	338	Fiat Cinquecento	304	Renault Safrane	244
1994	Ford Mondeo	290	Citroën Xantia	264	Mercedes-Benz C-Class	192
1995	Fiat Punto	370	Volkswagen Polo	292	Opel/Vauxhall Omega	272
1996	Fiat Bravo/Brava	378	Peugeot 406	363	Audi A4	246
1997	Renault Mégane Scénic	405	Ford Ka	293	Volkswagen Passat	248
1998	Alfa Romeo 156	454	Volkswagen Golf	266	Audi A6	265
1999	Ford Focus	444	Opel Astra	269	Peugeot 206	248
2000	Toyota Yaris/Yaris Verso	344	Fiat Multipla	325	Opel Zafira	265

- 2001–present

Year	Car	Points
2001
	Alfa Romeo 147	238
	Ford Mondeo	237
	Toyota Prius	229
	Audi A2	184
	Mercedes-Benz C-Class	164
	Opel Corsa	133
	Volvo S60	92
2002		
	Peugeot 307	286
	Renault Laguna	244
	Fiat Stilo	243
	Mini One	213
	Honda Civic	174
	Citroën C5	119
	Jaguar X-Type	86
2003		
	Renault Mégane	322
	Mazda 6	302
	Citroën C3	214
	Honda Jazz	167
	Ford Fiesta	161
	Opel Vectra	151
	Mercedes-Benz E-Class	133
2004
	Fiat Panda	281
	Mazda 3	241
	Volkswagen Golf	241
	Toyota Avensis	219
	Opel Meriva	213
	BMW 5 Series	144
	Nissan Micra	111
2005
	Toyota Prius	406
	Citroën C4	267
	Ford Focus	228
	Opel Astra	180
	Renault Modus	151
	Peugeot 407	135
	BMW 1 Series	83
2006
	Renault Clio	256
	Volkswagen Passat	251
	Alfa Romeo 159	212
	BMW 3 Series	203
	Mazda 5	198
	Citroën C1	187
	Toyota Yaris	143
2007
	Ford S-Max	235
	Opel Corsa	233
	Citroën C4 Picasso	222
	Škoda Roomster	189
	Honda Civic	148
	Peugeot 207	144
	Volvo C30	141
2008
	Fiat 500	385
	Mazda2	325
	Ford Mondeo	202
	Kia Ceed	166
	Nissan Qashqai	147
	Mercedes-Benz C-Class	128
	Peugeot 308	91
2009
	Opel Insignia	321
	Ford Fiesta	320
	Volkswagen Golf	223
	Citroën C5	198
	Alfa Romeo MiTo	148
	Škoda Superb	144
	Renault Mégane	121
2010
	Volkswagen Polo	347
	Toyota iQ	337
	Opel Astra	221
	Škoda Yeti	158
	Mercedes-Benz E-Class	155
	Peugeot 3008	144
	Citroën C3 Picasso	113
2011
	Nissan Leaf	257
	Alfa Romeo Giulietta	248
	Opel Meriva	244
	Ford C-Max	224
	Citroën DS3	175
	Volvo S60	145
	Dacia Duster	132
2012
	Chevrolet Volt/Opel Ampera	330
	Volkswagen up!	281
	Ford Focus	256
	Range Rover Evoque	186
	Fiat Panda	156
	Citroën DS5	144
	Toyota Yaris	122
2013
	Volkswagen Golf	414
	Toyota GT86/Subaru BRZ	202
	Volvo V40	189
	Ford B-Max	148
	Mercedes-Benz A-Class	138
	Renault Clio	128
	Peugeot 208	120
2014
	Peugeot 308	307
	BMW i3	223
	Tesla Model S	216
	Citroën C4 Picasso	182
	Mazda3	180
	Škoda Octavia	172
	Mercedes-Benz S-Class	170
2015
	Volkswagen Passat	340
	Citroën C4 Cactus	248
	Mercedes-Benz C-Class	221
	Ford Mondeo	203
	Nissan Qashqai	160
	BMW 2 Series Active Tourer	154
	Renault Twingo	124
2016
	Opel Astra	312
	Volvo XC90	294
	Mazda MX-5	202
	Audi A4	189
	Jaguar XE	163
	Škoda Superb	147
	BMW 7 Series	143
2017
	Peugeot 3008	319
	Alfa Romeo Giulia	296
	Mercedes-Benz E-Class	197
	Volvo S90	172
	Citroën C3	166
	Toyota C-HR	165
	Nissan Micra	135
2018
	Volvo XC40	325
	SEAT Ibiza	242
	BMW 5 Series	226
	Kia Stinger	204
	Citroën C3 Aircross	171
	Audi A8	169
	Alfa Romeo Stelvio	163
2019		
	Jaguar I-Pace**	250
	Alpine A110	250
	Kia Ceed	247
	Ford Focus	235
	Citroën C5 Aircross	210
	Peugeot 508	192
	Mercedes-Benz A-Class	116
2020
	Peugeot 208	281
	Tesla Model 3	242
	Porsche Taycan	222
	Renault Clio	211
	Ford Puma	209
	Toyota Corolla	152
	BMW 1 Series	133
2021
	Toyota Yaris	266
	Fiat 500	240
	Cupra Formentor	239
	Volkswagen ID.3	224
	Škoda Octavia	199
	Land Rover Defender	164
	Citroën C4	143
2022		
	Kia EV6	279
	Renault Mégane E-Tech	265
	Hyundai Ioniq 5*	261
	Peugeot 308	191
	Škoda Enyaq iV	185
	Ford Mustang Mach-E	150
	Cupra Born	144
2023		
	Jeep Avenger	328
	Volkswagen ID. Buzz*	241
	Nissan Ariya	211
	Kia Niro	200
	Renault Austral	163
	Peugeot 408	149
	Subaru Solterra/Toyota bZ4X	133
2024		
	Renault Scenic E-Tech	329
	BMW 5 Series	308
	Peugeot 3008	197
	Kia EV9	190
	Volvo EX30	168
	BYD Seal	131
	Toyota C-HR	127
2025		
	Renault 5 E-Tech/Alpine A290	353
	Kia EV3	291
	Citroën C3/ë-C3	217
	Dacia Duster	172
	Hyundai Inster	168
	Cupra Terramar	165
	Alfa Romeo Junior	136
2026		
	Mercedes-Benz CLA	320
	Škoda Elroq	220
	Kia EV4	208
	Citroën C5 Aircross	207
	Fiat Grande Panda	200
	Dacia Bigster	170
	Renault 4 E-Tech	150

* Indicates the vehicle won the German Car of the Year; underlining indicates the vehicle won the World Car Awards.
** The I-Pace received 18 first-place votes, compared to 16 for the A110.

=== By manufacturer ===
Manufacturer	Wins	Years
Alfa Romeo	2	1998, 2001
Audi	2	1973, 1983
Austin	1	1965
Chevrolet	1	2012
Citroën	3	1971, 1975, 1990
Fiat	9	1967, 1970, 1972, 1984, 1989, 1995, 1996, 2004, 2008
Ford	5	1981, 1986, 1994, 1999, 2007
Jaguar	1	2019
Jeep	1	2023
Kia	1	2022
Lancia	1	1980
Mercedes-Benz	2	1974, 2026
NSU	1	1968
Nissan	2	1993, 2011
Opel/Vauxhall	4	1985, 1987, 2009, 2016
Peugeot	6	1969, 1988, 2002, 2014, 2017, 2020
Porsche	1	1978
Renault	8	1966, 1982, 1991, 1997, 2003, 2006, 2024, 2025
Rover	2	1964, 1977
Simca	2	1976, 1979
Toyota	3	2000, 2005, 2021
Volkswagen	4	1992, 2010, 2013, 2015
Volvo	1	2018

== See also ==
- List of motor vehicle awards
- Car of the Year for other similar awards in different countries and by various magazine and institutions.
