= Pankow 5 =

State electoral district of Germany

- Electoral district for the Berlin House of Representatives
- Pankow 5 in 2026
- District: Pankow
- Electorate: 31,445 (2026)

Current electoral district
- Party: The Left
- Member: Enja Springob

Pankow 5 is an electoral constituency (German: Wahlkreis) represented in the House of Representatives of Berlin. It elects one member via first-past-the-post voting.

== Geography ==
The constituency comprises the areas of Heinersdorf, and the south of Pankow district within the borough of Pankow.

There were 31,445 eligible voters in 2026.

== Members ==
Election	Member	Party	%
2006	Sandra Scheeres	SPD	30.4
2011	Sandra Scheeres	SPD	32.0
2016	Udo Wolf	Left	25.3
2021	Louis Krüger	Green	21.9
2023	Louis Krüger	Green	22.2
2026	Enja Springob	Left	28.1

== Election results ==
=== 2026 election ===
State election (2026): Pankow 5
Notes:	Blue background denotes the winner of the electorate vote. Pink background denotes a candidate elected from their party list. Yellow background denotes an electorate win by a list member, or other incumbent. A ✓ or ✗ denotes status of any incumbent, win or lose respectively.						
Party	Candidate	Votes	%	±%	Party votes	%	±%
Left	Enja Springob	6,806	28.1	▲10.4	7,170	29.5	▲11.9
Greens	✗ Louis Krüger	5,339	22.1	▼0.1	4,025	16.5	▼3.0
AfD	Daniel Krüger	4,147	17.1	▲6.5	4,056	16.7	▲6.3
CDU	Denise Bittner	2,884	11.9	▼8.9	2,956	12.1	▼8.5
SPD	Arne Gröschel	2,567	10.6	▼7.6	2,617	10.7	▼6.7
BSW	Erwin Liedke	1,311	5.4		1,402	5.8	
Tierschutzpartei					608	2.5	▼0.2
Volt	Tim Schäfer	642	2.7		568	2.3	▲1.3
FDP	Oliver Simon	496	2.1	▼0.6	478	2.0	▼1.1
PARTEI					237	1.0	▼1.0
PdF					113	0.5	
DKP					46	0.2	▼0.2
ÖDP					30	0.1	Steady
du.					27	0.1	▼0.2
SGP					12	0.0	Steady
Informal votes		366			213		
Total valid votes		24,192			24,345		
Turnout		24,558	78.1	▲11.1			
Left gain from Greens	Majority	1,467	6.0				

=== 2023 repeat election ===
Changes denoted below for the 2023 election are compared to the 2016 election, as the 2021 election was declared invalid.

State election (2023): Pankow 5
Notes:	Blue background denotes the winner of the electorate vote. Pink background denotes a candidate elected from their party list. Yellow background denotes an electorate win by a list member, or other incumbent. A ✓ or ✗ denotes status of any incumbent, win or lose respectively.						
Party	Candidate	Votes	%	±%	Party votes	%	±%
Greens	Louis Krüger	4,431	22.1	▲7.5	3,920	19.6	▲5.3
CDU	Nils Tobias Pargmann	4,166	20.8	▲8.7	4,133	20.6	▲9.0
SPD	Tillmann Wormuth	3,644	18.2	▼6.0	3,491	17.4	▼4.0
Left	Katrin Seidel	3,553	17.7	▼7.5	3,522	17.6	▼6.5
AfD	Michael Adam	2,124	10.6	▼4.8	2,081	10.4	▼4.6
Tierschutzpartei	Jeanette Aline Köhn	666	3.3		539	2.7	▲0.7
FDP	Oliver Simon	538	2.7	▼0.1	619	3.1	▲0.2
PARTEI	Christian Schweiger	520	2.6	▼0.5	394	2.0	▼0.5
Volt					210	1.0	
dieBasis	Johnny Weston	201	1.0		164	0.8	
The Grays					122	0.6	
Gray Panthers					114	0.6	▼0.6
Mieterpartei					85	0.4	
FW	Ralf Köber	183	0.9		77	0.4	
Pirates					71	0.4	▼1.8
Verjüngungsforschung					69	0.3	▼0.5
DKP					68	0.3	▼0.1
Klimaliste					62	0.3	
du.					61	0.3	
Humanists					49	0.2	
Team Todenhöfer					49	0.2	
ÖDP					33	0.2	
Bildet Berlin!					29	0.1	
NPD					22	0.1	▼0.4
Bergpartei, die ÜberPartei					17	0.1	
SGP					16	0.1	▼0.1
BüSo					8	0.0	▼0.1
The Pinks/Alliance 21					8	0.0	Steady
LKR					5	0.0	▼0.5
Informal votes		182			165		
Total valid votes		20,026			20,038		
Turnout		20,227	67.0	▼2.7			
Greens gain from Left	Majority	265	1.3				

=== 2021 election (annulled) ===
The election in 2021 was annulled and rerun in 2023.

State election (2021): Pankow 5
Notes:	Blue background denotes the winner of the electorate vote. Pink background denotes a candidate elected from their party list. Yellow background denotes an electorate win by a list member, or other incumbent. A ✓ or ✗ denotes status of any incumbent, win or lose respectively.						
Party	Candidate	Votes	%	±%	Party votes	%	±%
Alliance /The Greens	Louis Krüger	5,036	21.9	▲7.3	4,729	20.6	▲6.3
Left	Katrin Seidel	4,856	21.1	▼4.1	4,695	20.4	▼3.7
SPD	Tillmann Wormuth	4,691	20.4	▼3.8	4,504	19.6	▼1.8
CDU	Nils Tobias Pargmann	2,759	12.0	▼0.1	2,675	11.6	Steady
AfD	Michael Adam	2,032	8.8	▼6.6	1,941	8.4	▼6.5
FDP	Oliver Simon	1,148	5.0	▲2.2	1,123	4.9	▲2.0
Tierschutzpartei	Jeanette Aline Köhn	844	3.7		518	2.3	▲0.3
PARTEI	Christian Schweiger	750	3.3	▲0.1	543	2.4	▼0.1
dieBasis	Johnny Weston	477	2.1		413	1.8	
The Grays					269	1.2	
FW	Ralf Köber	380	1.7		254	1.1	
Volt					250	1.1	
Gray Panthers					130	0.6	▼0.6
APT					128	0.6	
Pirates					120	0.5	▼1.6
Klimaliste					117	0.5	
Verjüngungsforschung					95	0.4	▼0.5
Mieterpartei					79	0.3	
Team Todenhöfer					74	0.3	
DKP					66	0.3	▼0.2
Humanists					45	0.2	
du.					41	0.2	
Bildet Berlin!					37	0.2	
ÖDP					37	0.2	
Bergpartei, die ÜberPartei					32	0.1	
NPD					27	0.1	▼0.4
The Pinks/Alliance 21					21	0.1	
SGP					15	0.1	▼0.1
LKR					11	0.0	▼0.5
BüSo					7	0.0	▼0.1
Informal votes		241			184		
Total valid votes		22,973			22,996		
Turnout		23,233	76.9	▲7.1			
Greens gain from SPD	Majority	180	0.8				

== See also ==
- Politics of Berlin
- House of Representatives of Berlin
