= Hubert Trzybinski =

German rower (born 1991)

Medal record

Men's Rowing

Representing Germany

World U23 Championships
Gold medal – first place	2011 Amsterdam	M1x
Gold medal – first place	2013 Linz	M1x
Silver medal – second place	2012 Trakai	M1x

Hubert Trzybinski (born 26 April 1991 in Berlin) is a German rower. He won the single scull World U23 Championships in 2011 and 2013.
