= Peter Baumgartner (ice hockey) =

German ice hockey player

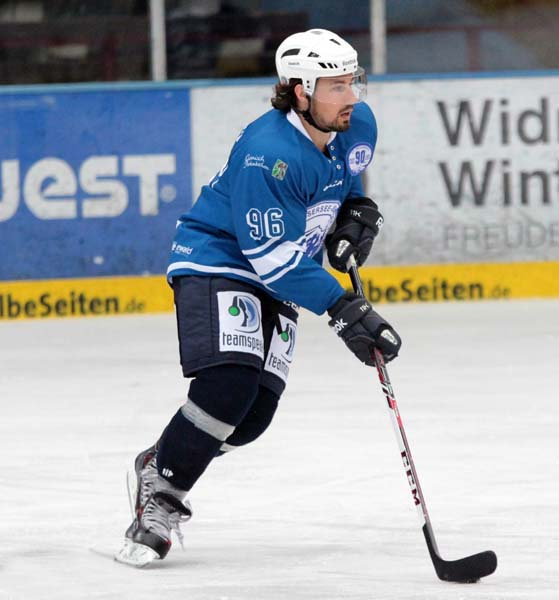
- Born: July 22, 1986 (age 39); Vilsbiburg, West Germany
- Height: 6 ft 0 in (183 cm)
- Weight: 198 lb (90 kg; 14 st 2 lb)
- Position: Defence
- Shot: Left
- Played for: EV Landshut; ERC Ingolstadt; Moskitos Essen; EC Peiting; Hannover Indians; SERC Wild Wings; Hannover Scorpions; Fischtown Pinguins; Löwen Frankfurt; SC Riessersee
- Playing career: 2002–2018

Peter Baumgartner is a German professional ice hockey defenceman who is currently playing for the Hannover Scorpions in the Deutsche Eishockey Liga (DEL).

== Career statistics ==
			Regular season					Playoffs
Season	Team	League	GP	G	A	Pts	PIM	GP	G	A	Pts	PIM
2002–03	EV Landshut U18	DNL	32	3	12	15	77	2	1	1	2	0
2003–04	EV Landshut U18	DNL	33	25	28	53	88	1	0	0	0	2
2003–04	Landshut Cannibals	Germany2	6	0	0	0	0	—	—	—	—	—
2004–05	Landshut Cannibals	Germany2	35	1	1	2	12	4	0	0	0	0
2004–05	ERC Ingolstadt	DEL	1	0	0	0	0	—	—	—	—	—
2005–06	ESC Moskitos Essen U20	Junioren-BL	5	0	3	3	8	—	—	—	—	—
2005–06	Moskitos Essen	Germany2	46	0	0	0	28	—	—	—	—	—
2006–07	EC Peiting	Germany3	50	0	10	10	54	5	0	2	2	2
2007–08	Hannover Indians	Germany3	52	15	27	42	50	7	2	5	7	10
2008–09	SERC Wild Wings	Germany2	46	1	0	1	14	2	0	0	0	4
2008–09	Hannover Indians	Germany3	2	0	2	2	0	—	—	—	—	—
2009–10	Hannover Scorpions	DEL	22	0	0	0	8	11	0	0	0	0
2009–10	Fischtown Pinguins	Germany2	37	4	4	8	14	—	—	—	—	—
2010–11	Hannover Scorpions	DEL	51	0	6	6	28	5	0	0	0	27
2011–12	Hannover Indians	Germany2	45	6	8	14	30	—	—	—	—	—
2012–13	Löwen Frankfurt	Germany3	36	6	34	40	28	14	2	2	4	12
2013–14	SC Riessersee	DEL2	53	6	21	27	38	—	—	—	—	—
2014–15	EV Landshut	DEL2	43	6	11	17	67	8	0	1	1	29
2015–16	EV Landshut	Germany3	35	5	9	14	70	7	1	1	2	6
2016–17	EV Landshut	Germany3	46	4	17	21	36	3	1	0	1	4
2017–18	EV Landshut	Germany3	44	0	18	18	30	4	1	1	2	2
DEL totals			74	0	6	6	36	16	0	0	0	27
DEL2 totals			96	12	32	44	105	8	0	1	1	29
Germany2 totals			215	12	13	25	98	7	0	0	0	4
Germany3 totals			265	30	117	147	268	40	7	11	18	36
