= Fiat Tipo =

Fiat Tipo may refer to one of two vehicles manufactured by FIAT:

- Fiat Tipo (Type 160), a small family car manufactured from 1988 to 2000
- Fiat Tipo (2015), a small family car in production since 2015

== See also ==
- Fiat Tipo Due platform, a front wheel drive platform, used by the Fiat Tipo (Type 160)
- Fiat Tipo Tre platform, a front wheel drive platform, used by the Fiat Tempra
- Fiat Tipo Quattro platform, a front wheel drive platform, used by the Fiat Croma
