= Alske Freter =

German politician (born 1991)

Member of the Hamburg Parliament
- Incumbent
- Assumed office 18 March 2020

Personal details
- Born: 29 October 1991 (age 34)
- Party: Alliance 90/The Greens (since 2009)

Alske Rebekka Freter (born 29 October 1991) is a German politician serving as a member of the Hamburg Parliament since 2020. From 2016 to 2020, she served as chairwoman of Alliance 90/The Greens in Hamburg-Nord.
