= Fernsehen aus Berlin =

Regional television station in Berlin

- Broadcast area: Berlin and surrounding region
- Headquarters: Berlin

Programming
- Picture format: 576i (4:3 SDTV)

History
- Launched: 1 February 1991
- Closed: 1 April 2009

Fernsehen aus Berlin (FAB) was a regional television station in Berlin, Germany. FAB was founded on 15 August 1990 and started its first broadcast on 1 February 1991. FAB operated on a complex rotating schedule, broadcasting several hours of fresh programming per day, focusing on local and regional themes with an emphasis on informational broadcasts. Its main evening programme was "Hallo Berlin", presenting daily news and lotto numbers.

FAB could be received via analogue terrestrial broadcast and by cable television. By first, it shared a frequency with RTL Television, but was available on a dedicated frequency in later years, as well as on DVB-T.

The shareholder structure consisted of a large number of medium-sized program producers, including Stefan Aust, who also contributed the content. The majority owner, with a stake of around 40%, was Deutsche Fernsehnachrichten Agentur. At the end of 2006, the station received a new broadcasting license, which enabled it to expand further. In spring 2008, FAB had opened a new, state-of-the-art media center in Genthiner Straße, Berlin-Tiergarten. On 29 January 2009, the company declared bankruptcy and ceased operation by April 1 of the same year.
