= Niklas Hörber =

German footballer

Personal information
- Date of birth: 14 May 1991 (age 35)
- Place of birth: Lauf an der Pegnitz, Germany
- Height: 1.84 m (6 ft 0 in)
- Position: Forward

Youth career
- –2006: SK Lauf
- 2006–2010: 1. FC Nürnberg

Senior career*
Years	Team	Apps	(Gls)
2009–2011	1. FC Nürnberg II	46	(3)
2011–2012	Werder Bremen II	15	(0)
2012–2013	Bayern Hof	9	(0)
Total		70	(3)

International career
2006–2007	Germany U16	6	(2)
2008	Germany U17	4	(0)
2009	Germany U18	6	(1)
- * Club domestic league appearances and goals

Niklas Hörber (born 14 May 1991) is a German former professional footballer who played as a forward.
