= Enja Springob =

German politician (born 1991)

Member of the Berlin House of Representatives
- Assuming office 29 October 2026
- Succeeding: Louis Krüger
- Constituency: Pankow 5

Personal details
- Born: 1991 (age 34–35)
- Party: Die Linke

Enja Springob (born 1991) is a German politician who was elected member of the Berlin House of Representatives in 2026. She has served as co-chair of Die Linke in Pankow since 2025.
