= 2026 in Australia =

- Monarch: Charles III
- Governor-General: Sam Mostyn
- Prime minister: Anthony Albanese
- Australian of the Year: Katherine Bennell-Pegg

- Decades: 2000s; 2010s; 2020s; 2030s
- See also: 2026 in Australian literature; Other events of 2026; Timeline of Australian history

The following is a list of events including expected and scheduled events for the year 2026 in Australia.

== Incumbents ==
Monarch

Charles III

Governor-General

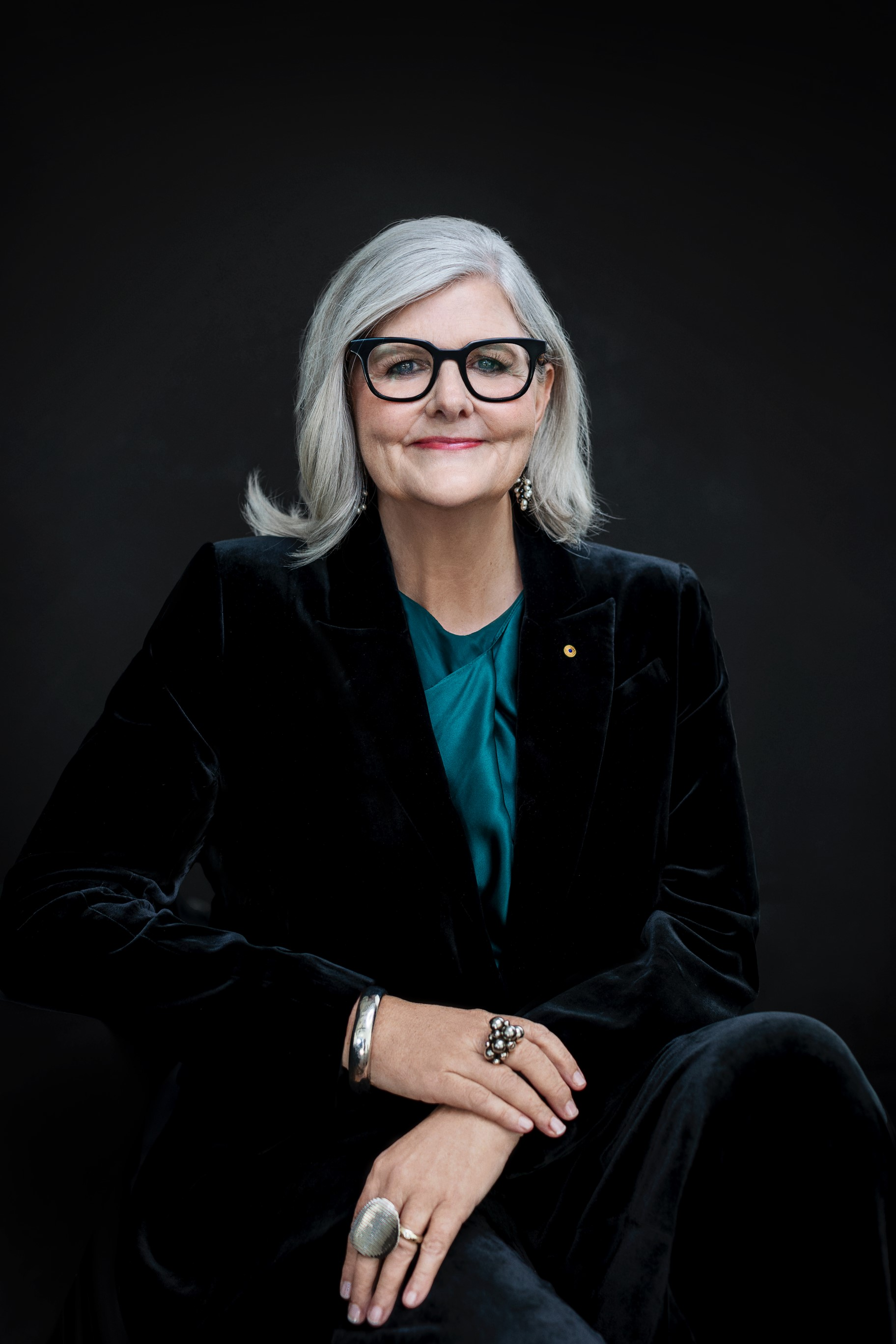
Sam Mostyn

Prime Minister

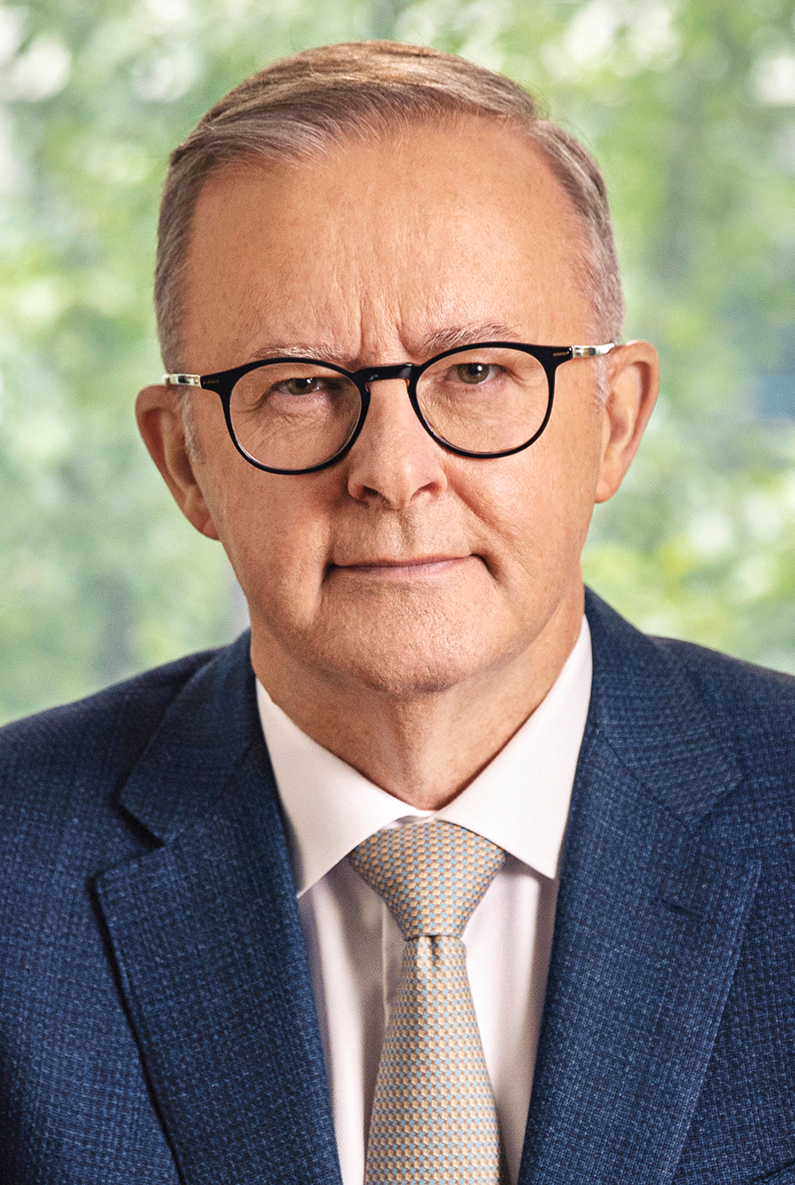
Anthony Albanese

Deputy Prime Minister

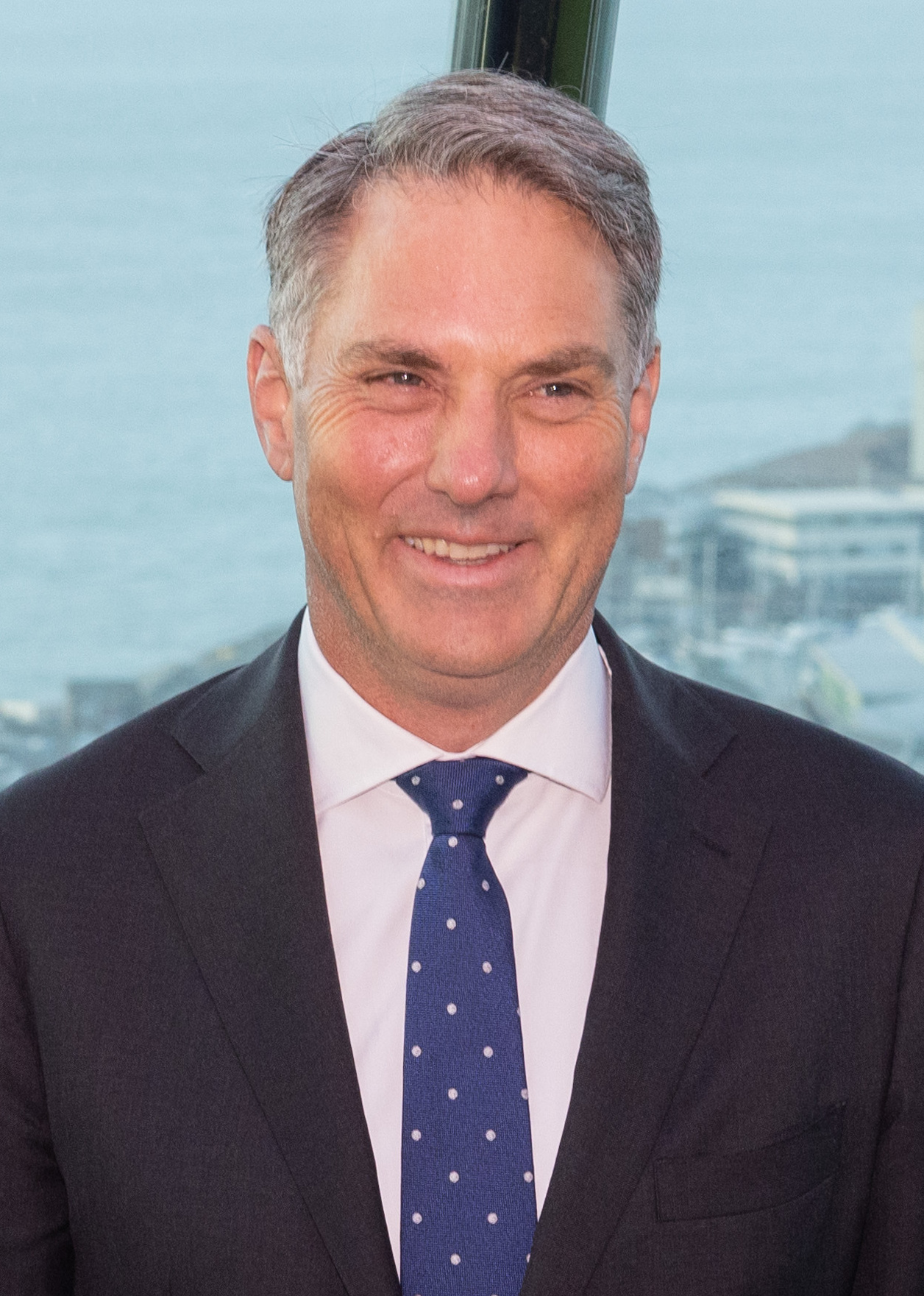
Richard Marles

Opposition Leader

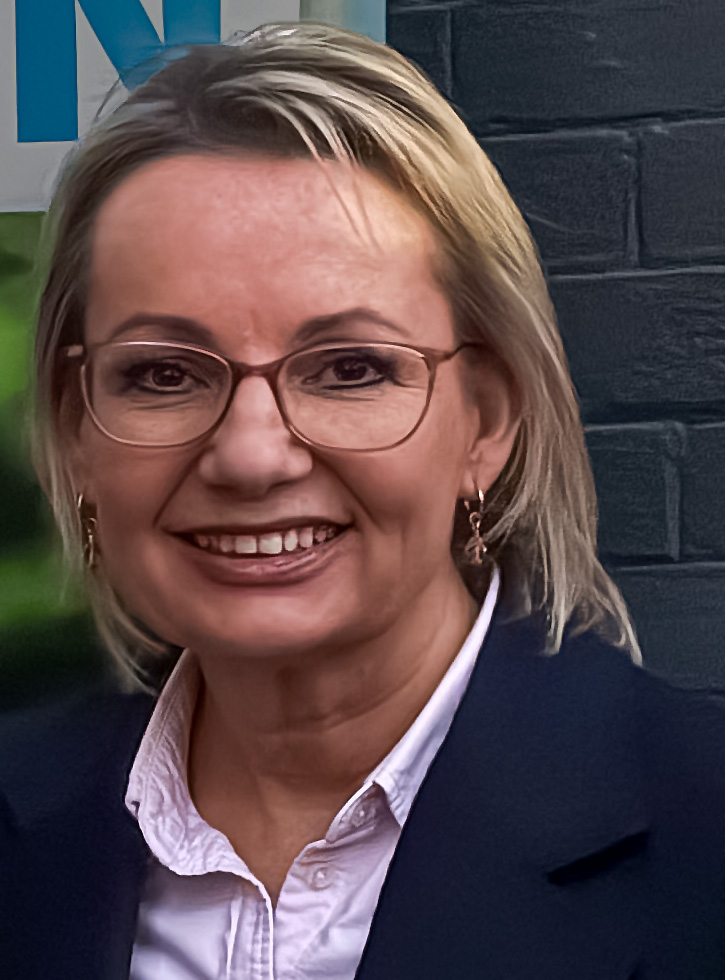

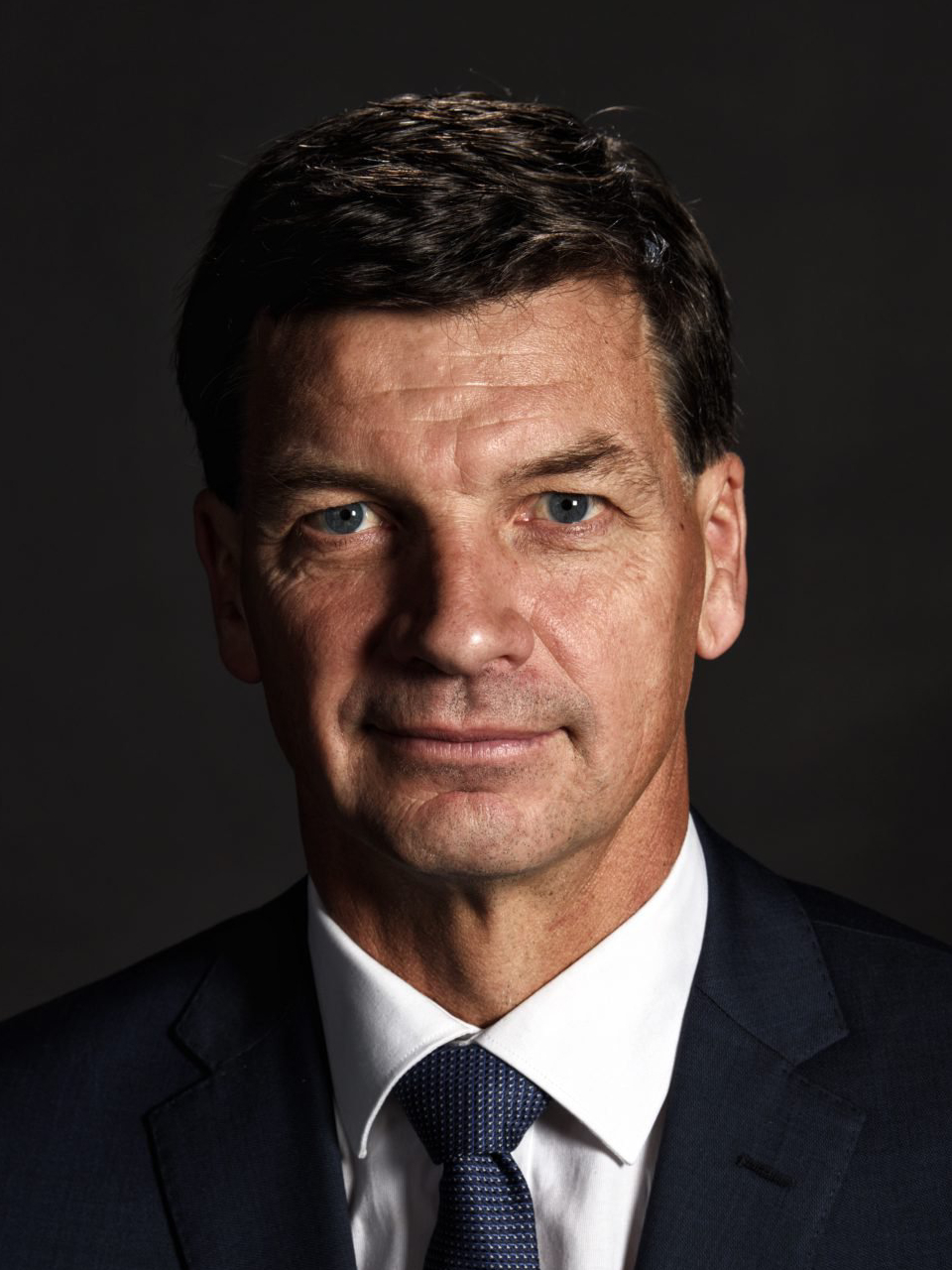

Sussan Ley until 13 February, then Angus Taylor

Chief Justice

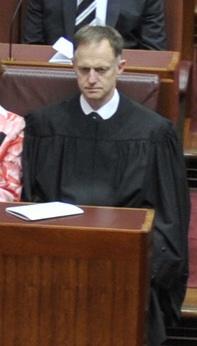
Stephen Gageler

=== State and territory leaders ===
- Premier of New South Wales – Chris Minns
  - Opposition Leader – Kellie Sloane
- Premier of Queensland – David Crisafulli
  - Opposition Leader – Steven Miles
- Premier of South Australia – Peter Malinauskas
  - Opposition Leader – Ashton Hurn
- Premier of Tasmania – Jeremy Rockliff
  - Opposition Leader – Josh Willie
- Premier of Victoria – Jacinta Allan (until 28 July), then Ben Carroll
  - Opposition Leader – Jess Wilson
- Premier of Western Australia – Roger Cook
  - Opposition Leader – Basil Zempilas
- Chief Minister of the Australian Capital Territory – Andrew Barr
  - Opposition Leader – Mark Parton
- Chief Minister of the Northern Territory – Lia Finocchiaro
  - Opposition Leader – Selena Uibo

=== Governors and administrators ===
- Governor of New South Wales – Margaret Beazley
- Governor of Queensland – Jeannette Young
- Governor of South Australia – Frances Adamson
- Governor of Tasmania – Barbara Baker (until 15 June), then Caroline Wells (from 17 June)
- Governor of Victoria – Margaret Gardner
- Governor of Western Australia – Chris Dawson
- Administrator of the Australian Indian Ocean Territories – Farzian Zainal
- Administrator of Norfolk Island – George Plant (until 31 May), then Fiona McKergow
- Administrator of the Northern Territory – Hugh Heggie (until 30 January), then David Connolly

== Events ==
=== January ===
- 4 January – Over 60 prominent sportspeople including tennis player Lleyton Hewitt, canoeist Jessica Fox, swimmer Ian Thorpe and former cricket team captain Michael Clarke pen an open letter calling on Prime Minister Anthony Albanese to establish a federal royal commission into antisemitism, radicalisation and the Bondi Beach shooting.
- 8 January:
  - Prime Minister Albanese announces a royal commission into antisemitism and social cohesion, to be chaired by Virginia Bell. In response, New South Wales Premier Chris Minns announces that his state would not proceed with a state-level royal commission.
  - Six emergency warnings are issued in Victoria in response to bushfires.
  - Blak Caucus, the Palestine Action Group and Jews Against the Occupation' 48 file a challenge against new laws restricting protests in New South Wales at the Supreme Court of New South Wales.
- 9 January – A total fire ban comes into force in Victoria in response to an ongoing heatwave.
- 10 January – Wildfires destroy 130 structures in Victoria, prompting premier Jacinta Allan declares a statewide emergency. The Australian Capital Territory declares a total fire ban.
- 12 January – The National Socialist Network (NSN) announces it would disband in response to proposed new hate speech laws by the federal government which would make it easier to designate organisations as prohibited hate groups.
- 13 January – The 2026 edition of Adelaide Writers' Week is called off after more than 180 writers and speakers boycott the event in protest against the organisers' decision to exclude Australian-Palestinian writer and academic Randa Abdel-Fattah.
- 15 January – The board of the Adelaide Festival retracts the Adelaide Writers' Week's decision to exclude Randa Abdel-Fattah from the event and issues an apology to her.
- 18 January:
  - Heavy rain leads to flooding and landslides in coastal New South Wales particularly Sydney, which records 127 mm (5.0 in) of rain. The State Emergency Service responds to about 2,500 calls for help and performed 25 flood rescues.
  - Pauline Hanson's One Nation overtakes the Liberal–National Coalition in a first for Newspoll. The Coalition also polls at its record low.
  - A 12-year-old boy is severely injured in a shark attack off Shark Beach in Vaucluse, New South Wales, resulting in his death in hospital on 24 January.
- 19 January:
  - A man is severely injured in a shark attack off Manly Beach in New South Wales.
  - The New Sydney Fish Market at Glebe, New South Wales opens to the public after 6 years of construction.
- 20 January –
  - The Hate Speech Bill passes both houses of parliament, following a 116–7 vote in the House and a 38–22 vote in the senate.
  - A surfer is injured in a shark attack off Point Plomer in New South Wales.
- 21 January – National Party of Australia senators Bridget McKenzie, Ross Cadell and Susan McDonald quit the Ley shadow ministry after opposing the official Liberal–National Coalition position on the hate speech law. Following this, the eight remaining National frontbenchers also resign from the shadow cabinet.
- 22 January:
  - National leader David Littleproud confirms the party had again quit the Coalition, saying "our partyroom has made it clear that we cannot be part of a shadow ministry under Sussan Ley" and that "we sit by ourselves" in the parliament. This is the second time the National party left the Coalition since 2025.
  - 2026 Lake Cargelligo shootings: Three people are killed and another injured in a shooting in Lake Cargelligo, New South Wales.
- 26 January:
  - March for Australia holds a series of nationwide protests in many Australian cities.
  - A 31-year-old man is arrested for throwing a homemade "fragment bomb" at a crowd gathering for an Invasion Day rally in Perth's Forrest Place, which fails to detonate. The man is charged with one count of committing an unlawful act with intent to harm and one count of making explosives under suspicious circumstances.
- 28 January – Colin Boyce announces he will challenge David Littleproud for the leadership of the National Party of Australia.
- 30 January – A 13-year-old boy swims four hours to shore in Quindalup to get help for his mother and two younger siblings, who had been swept out to sea while kayaking.

=== February ===
- 2 February –
  - February 2026 National Party of Australia leadership spill motion: Incumbent leader David Littleproud is re-elected, defeating Queensland MP Colin Boyce.
  - Pauline Hanson's One Nation announce former Liberal senator Cory Bernardi will lead the upper house ticket in the 2026 South Australian state election.
- 5 February –
  - The Australian Federal Police charge a 31-year-old man with one count of engaging in a terrorist attack in relation to an attempted bombing at an Invasion Day rally in Perth on 26 January.
  - The Australian Federal Police charge a 19-year old Sydney teenager with one count of using a social media platform to issue a death threat against Israeli President Isaac Herzog, who is expected to arrive in Australia for a state visit on 8 February.
- 6 February –
  - Drug lord Tony Mokbel is released from prison after prosecutors withdraw a planned retrial on charges of importing MDMA.
  - Australia and Indonesia sign a bilateral security agreement.
- 8 February – The Liberal–National Coalition reunites.
- 9 February –
  - Kat McNamara resigns as member of the Northern Territory Legislative Assembly for Nightcliff, citing health issues.
  - Israeli President Isaac Herzog arrives in Australia for a four-day visit and pays respects to victims of the Bondi Beach shooting. His visit generates controversy due to allegations that he incited genocide during the Gaza war. Six thousand protesters opposing Herzog's visit gather outside Sydney Town Hall organised by the Palestine Action Group and attempt to march in defiance of new protest laws in New South Wales, leading to scuffles with police.
  - The Supreme Court of New South Wales rejects a legal challenge by the Palestine Action Group against the New South Wales government's decision to grant police extended powers to manage protests during Herzog's state visit.
- 12 February – Five thousand pro-Palestine protesters march through the Melbourne central business district in protest against Herzog's visit. Separate pro-Palestine and pro-Israel demonstrations are held outside an event hosting Herzog in Southbank, Victoria. Unlike the earlier Sydney Town Hall protest, the Melbourne protest is peaceful with police only making one arrest.
- 13 February –
  - 2026 Liberal Party of Australia leadership spill is held. Angus Taylor wins the election against Sussan Ley.
  - The Law Enforcement Conduct Commission launches an investigation into the conduct of New South Wales Police Force personnel during a pro-Palestine rally outside the Sydney Town Hall on 9 February.
  - Multiple ancient Egyptian artefacts are stolen following a heist at the Abbey Museum of Art and Archaeology in Caboolture, Queensland. Most of the items are recovered following the arrest of a 52-year-old man the next day.
- 24 February –
  - The Australian Federal Police evacuate Prime Minister Albanese from The Lodge after an alleged bomb threat against the Falun Gong-linked Shen Yun dance and music group's tour of Australia.
  - Prime Minister Albanese endorses the removal of Andrew Mountbatten-Windsor from the royal line of succession over his involvement in the Epstein scandal.
- 25 February – Queensland Police confirm they are investigating an alleged bomb threat against the Home of the Arts theatre for hosting a Shen Yun performance.

=== March ===
- 3 March – An Iranian drone strike damages Al Minhad Air Base in the UAE, the headquarters of the Australian Defence Force's Joint Task Force 633. Defence minister Richard Marles confirms that there were no casualties in the strike.
- 4 March – The Australian Parliament launches a federal inquiry into racism, hate and violence against Indigenous Australians in response to the 2026 Invasion Day protest bombing attempt.
- 5 March –
  - Canadian Prime Minister Mark Carney makes his address to the Australian Parliament in Canberra.
  - Australia deploys military assets and crisis response teams to the Middle East to assist and evacuate its nationals.
  - The Queensland Parliament passes legislation banning the use of the phrase "Globalise the Intifada" and "from the river to the sea" by protesters, subjected to a two-year prison term. Becoming the first state in Australia to outlaw the slogans. The LNP and the KAP voted for it, while Labor and the Greens voted against it.
- 7 March – 2026 Nightcliff by-election is held.
- 9 March – A court in Bali, Indonesia, sentences three Australian nationals to up to 16 years' imprisonment for the contract killing of another Australian national, Zivan Radmanovic, in 2025.
- 10 March –
  - National Party of Australia leader David Littleproud announces his resignation from his position as the leader of the Nationals, citing himself as "buggered", he intends to remain in parliament as member for Maranoa though.
  - The government grants humanitarian visas to five members of the Iran women's national football team competing in the 2026 AFC Women's Asian Cup amid fears for their safety during the 2026 Iran war and their refusal to sing the Iranian national anthem during a match against South Korea. Two more footballers subsequently sought asylum in Australia, bringing the total number to seven.
  - Prime Minister Albanese confirms that Australia would deploy a long-range reconnaissance aircraft and air-to-air missiles to the United Arab Emirates to help the Gulf States defend themselves against Iranian missiles.
- 11 March – Matt Canavan becomes National Party of Australia leader after winning the leadership ballot.
- 13 March —
  - The government releases six days' worth of petroleum and five days' worth of diesel fuel following a global International Energy Agency directive in response to supply disruptions caused by the 2026 Iran war.
  - A court in Sydney convicts businessman Alexander Csergo of reckless foreign interference over his compilation of reports for two suspected Chinese spies.
- 14–19 March – King Frederik X of Denmark and Queen Mary of Denmark undertake a six-day tour of Australia.
- 15 March – Four members of the Iranian women's football team who had earlier been granted asylum by the Australian government change their minds and decide to return to Iran due to concerns that their families would be targeted for retribution by the Iranian authorities.
- 16 March – Australia rules out sending warships to lift the blockade of the Strait of Hormuz.
- 20 March – Prime Minister Anthony Albanese and Home Affairs Minister Tony Burke are heckled at an Eid morning prayers event at Lakemba Mosque. Several mosque attendees accuse the Prime Minister and Home Affairs Minister of being "genocide supporters".
- 21 March –
  - 2026 South Australian state election: One Nation sees its best performance in any state or federal election since the 1998 Queensland state election, when the party won 22.68%.
  - 2026 South Australian First Nations Voice election
- 23 March – Australia and the European Union sign a free trade agreement after eight years of negotiations.
- 25 March – Home Affairs Minister Tony Burke announces a six-month ban on most Iranian visitor visa holders in response to the ongoing 2026 Iran war.
- 26 March – Thousands of Australian Broadcasting Corporation employees stage a 24-hour strike in response to a pay dispute, marking the first major strike at the public broadcaster in 20 years.
- 30 March – Victoria Police fatally shoot Dezi Freeman, a sovereign citizen and fugitive who was on the run for seven months after he killed two police officers and seriously injured another in a shooting in Porepunkah.
- 31 March – Communications Minister Anika Wells announces that the Australian government will investigate social media platforms Facebook, Instagram, Snapchat, TikTok and YouTube for potential violations of the under-16 social media ban.

=== April ===
- 1 April – The federal government reduces the fuel excise rate to 26.3 cents per litre between 1 April and 30 June to address rising fuel prices caused by the 2026 Iran war.
- 7 April:
  - War veteran and Victoria Cross recipient Ben Roberts-Smith is arrested by the Australian Federal Police and charged with five counts of the war crime of murder.
  - Federal Court Justice Michael Lee rules that accused secret police agent Adriana Elcira Rivas can be extradited to Chile to face trial on seven charges of aggravated kidnapping during Augusto Pinochet's dictatorship.
- 10 April – Singapore and Australia sign a mutual energy supply agreement, with Singapore agreeing to supply refine fuel in return for Australia supplying liquefied natural gas.
- 15 April –
  - A major fire hits the Geelong Oil Refinery in Victoria, causing serious disruptions in the country's fuel supply.
  - The High Court of Australia rules in Hopper v Victoria, striking down a large portion of Victoria's laws governing political donations.
- 16 April – The NSW Supreme Court strikes down as unconstitutional the NSW anti-protest laws, passed on 24 December 2025 as a response to the Bondi mass-shooting, after finding them impermissibly burdening the implied freedom of political communication.
- 17 April – War veteran and Victoria Cross recipient Ben Roberts-Smith is granted bail.
- 18 April – The 2026 Newcastle lord mayoral by-election is held, resulting in the election of Gavin Morris.
- 29 April — Two people are killed and 11 others are injured when a Diamond DA42 Twin Star crashes into a hangar at Parafield Airport in South Australia.
- 30 April:
  - A 47-year old Alice Springs man is arrested in relation to the killing of Kumanjayi Little Baby, whose remains were also found that same day following a five-day search. Police intervene to save the suspect from being lynched by angry locals and also clash with rioters outside Alice Springs Hospital.
  - The Royal Commission on Antisemitism and Social Cohesion releases its interim report, which makes 14 recommendations to strengthen counterterrorism responses. It also clears the Australian authorities of failing to respond or prevent the Bondi Beach shooting.

=== May ===
- 2 May:
  - The 2026 Nepean state by-election is held, resulting in the election of Victorian Liberal Party legislator Anthony Marsh.
  - The 2026 Tasmanian Legislative Council periodic election is held, resulting in the elections of independent legislator Clare Glade-Wright and Tasmanian Liberal Party legislator Jo Palmer.
  - A 47-year-old man is charged with murder and two counts of sexual assault in relation to the killing of Kumanjayi Little Baby.
- 4 May:
  - A yacht sinks during high waves off South Ballina, New South Wales, followed by a rescue vessel trying to assist, killing three people including two rescuers.
  - Prime Minister Albanese and Japanese Prime Minister Sanae Takaichi sign four agreements in Canberra to strengthen bilateral cooperation in the areas of energy, defence and critical minerals, and issue a joint declaration on economic security cooperation.
- 6 May – The Australian government confirms the repatriation of a group of four Islamic State–linked Australian women and nine children from the Al-Roj refugee camp. They are expected to arrive in Australia the following day.
- 7 May – Several ISIS-linked women and children land in Sydney and Melbourne. Counter-terrorism police charge two of the women, who arrived at Melbourne Airport, with crimes against humanity relating to slavery. Police arrest and charge one of the women, who arrived at Sydney Airport, with entering a prohibited area and being a member of a terrorist organisation.
- 8 May – Richard Lewer wins the Archibald Prize for his portrait of artist, traditional healer, and Aboriginal elder Iluwanti Ken.
- 9 May – 2026 Farrer by-election: David Farley is elected as MP, making him the first legislator from One Nation to win an election to the House of Representatives.
- 12 May – The 2026 Australian federal budget is released.
- 15 May:
  - The neo-Nazi National Socialist Network (NSN) is banned by the government under new laws against hate groups. The group is mounting a legal challenge to the government's ban of the group.
  - The Federal Court of Australia upholds a 2024 decision by a lower court which found that the female-only social media app Giggle for Girls and its founder and CEO Sall Grover had discriminated against transgender woman Roxanne Tickle. The Federal Court also ordered the defendants to pay Tickle's court costs and a A$20,000 fine.
- 16 May:
  - A man is killed in a shark attack on Horseshoe Reef near Rottnest Island in Western Australia.
  - Australia's Delta Goodrem finishes fourth at Eurovision 2026 in Austria with the single "Eclipse".
  - The 2026 Stafford state by-election is held, resulting in the election of Queensland Labor Party legislator Luke Richmond.
- 26 May – The Northern Territory announces the first recorded fatality from diphtheria in Australia since 2018 following the results from an autopsy on a patient who died at Royal Darwin Hospital in April.
- 28 May – The Australian government files a A$2 billion lawsuit against the American multinational conglomerate 3M, alleging that the company made false statements about the long-term environmental impact of firefighting foam containing PFAS that was used at 28 Australian Defence Force sites. This lawsuit marks the largest legal claim brought by the Australian Government. 3M responds that it would fight the lawsuit.
- 29 May – Tony Abbott is elected Liberal Party president unopposed.

=== June ===
- 3 June – A court in Sydney bars David James Cook from entering Sydney University or coming into contact with Princess Ingrid Alexandra of Norway and the Norwegian royal family for two years amid charges of harassment.
- 6 June – A man is killed in a shark attack off Michaelmas Island in Western Australia.
- 13 June – A woman is injured in a shark attack off Coogee Beach in New South Wales.
- 16 June:
  - The Australian Federal Police confirms it is investigating allegations that Israeli forces raped and tortured four Australian female activists from the Global Sumud Flotilla who were detained in May 2026 while attempting to deliver aid to the Gaza Strip. The Israeli Embassy has denounced their accusations as "false."
  - Retailer Lincraft confirms plans to close its remaining stores in Australia and New Zealand over the next six months, affecting 300 jobs.
- 17 June –
  - The South Australian Legislative Council narrowly 10–9, passes a bill that would restrict late-term abortions but was defeated 9–36 in the lower house.
  - Pauline Hanson, leader of One Nation party, delivers a speech to the National Press Club, calling for Australia to become a monocultural state and an overhaul of industrial relations.
- 19 June – In the largest seizure of cocaine in Australia, police arrest two people and seize 2.7 tonnes of the substance valued at A$816 million hidden in three shipping containers at a property in Londonderry, New South Wales.
- 20 June – The first case of H5N1 avian influenza in Australia is discovered in a brown skua at the Cape Le Grand National Park in Western Australia, resulting in the virus being confirmed as present in all continents.
- 22 June – Canada and Australia sign a $1.75 billion export agreement for the construction of an Australian-designed long-range radar system in Canada as part of an early warning network.
- 25 June:
  - Independent MPs Zali Steggall and Allegra Spender establish the Community Strong Australia party in Canberra.
  - Jonathan Huston, a member of the Western Australian Legislative Assembly, leaves the Liberal Party.
- 27 June:
  - Queensland Police shoot an armed man in Brisbane.
  - An Australian man is arrested after the body of a teenage girl is found in a suitcase in Thailand.
  - Australia introduces legislation to increase penalties for social media platforms that fail to enforce its under-16 ban, raising the maximum fine to A$99 million and expanding regulatory powers to investigate compliance.
- 29 June – Australia and Vanuatu sign the Nakamal Agreement in Canberra, strengthening cooperation on security, economic development, climate resilience, and infrastructure protection, with Australia remaining Vanuatu's primary security and policing partner.
- 30 June – The Australian Competition and Consumer Commission sues Amazon's Australia unit, alleging that its Prime Video subscription contracts contained unfair terms that allowed the company to add advertising to its streaming service.

=== July ===
- 6 July – The Fijian and Australian governments sign two bilateral defence and economic treaties in Suva.
- 8 July – A nationwide outage hits Telstra, causing disruptions to transportation and emergency communications.
- 9 July – Indian Prime Minister Narendra Modi visits Melbourne, signing a defence and uranium export agreement with Prime Minister Anthony Albanese. Modi later stages a rally in Docklands Stadium with thousands in attendance.
- 15 July – Prime Minister Albanese announces the establishment of an "Office of AI" to manage the development of artificial intelligence standards and to regulate data centres.
- 24 July – The United States imposes a new 12.5% tariff on Australia, citing alleged forced labour in the Australian supply chain. This is part of a new wave of tariffs on 60 countries replacing the Liberation Day tariffs, that were earlier invalidated by a Supreme Court ruling.
- 27 July:
  - Television news network Sky News Australia is rebranded as News24.
  - Nationwide test of the AusAlert wireless alert system occurs at 2:00 p.m. AEST, reaching millions of devices.
- 28 July – Jacinta Allan resigns as Premier of Victoria, triggering a leadership spill within the Victorian Labor Party. That same day, Ben Carroll is elected as Premier by the Labor caucus.

=== August ===
- 3 August – A building collapses in Sydney, seriously injuring two men.
- 11 August –
  - The federal government begins vaccinating vulnerable native birds to combat the H5N1 virus.
  - 2026 Australian census
- 16 August – New South Wales becomes the first state to join the federal government's gun buyback scheme established following the 2025 Bondi Beach shooting.
- 22 August – The Australian Capital Territory joins the federal government's gun buyback scheme.
- 29 August – Luke Herdegen wins the 2026 Secret Harbour state by-election, becoming the first One Nation candidate to be elected to the Western Australian Legislative Assembly.
- 31 August – Queensland passes several controversial new legislation setting age limits and licensing requirements for ebike and e-scooter users.

=== September ===
- 8 September – The High Court of Australia heard a constitutional challenge from the National Socialist Network (NSN) related to the constitutionality of the 2026 hate speech and hate group legislation.
- 16 September – The New South Wales Legislative Council votes down 21 to 16, a bill that would ban sex-selective abortions.
- 18 September – One person is killed in a shark attack off Sorrento Beach in Perth.
- 19 September – South Australian Liberal senator Alex Antic is elected president of the South Australian branch of the Liberal Party, winning 119 votes to 73, over the only other candidate, the moderate Nicola Centofanti.
- 20 September – Two children die in a stabbing near Springwood, New South Wales, by their mother, who attempted suicide at the scene. She is charged with two counts of murder.
- 23 September – Prime Minister Albanese announces that a rogue OpenAI agent gained access to government data after hacking into the website of Medicare in June, in the first such incident of its kind in history.

=== October ===
- 3 October – A car drives into a crowd of people, including children, who were sending off the Newcastle Knights in Newcastle.
- 5 October – A vehicle overturns during a military exercise at the Mount Bundey Training Area in the Northern Territory, killing a soldier and injuring five others.
- 5-27 October – 2026 Tasmanian local elections: Charles Wooley is elected Lord Mayor of Hobart, succeeding Anna Reynolds. Abby McKibben is elected as Mayor of Huon Valley while Matthew Garwood is elected as Mayor of Launceston.
- 7 October –
  - A court in Western Australia sentences former Broome bishop Christopher Saunders to six years' imprisonment for sexually abusing two young Aboriginal men.
  - Aylo partially restores access to Pornhub in Australia following an eight-month outage caused by revised child protection laws.
- 19 October – Independent MP Helen Haines is critically injured after being deliberately struck by a vehicle outside her electorate office in Wangaratta, Victoria. A 43-year-old man is arrested, and a counterterrorism investigation is launched.
- 25 October – Passenger flights commence from Western Sydney Airport.
- 30 October – The Victoria Court of Appeal rejects Erin Patterson's appeal against her murder convictions and sentences. The Court also rules in favour of the prosecution's bid to increase her sentence to life imprisonment without parole.

=== November ===
- 5 November:
  - David Jones goes into voluntary administration after 188 years in operation.
  - Australia imposes sanctions on Sudanese Armed Forces chief Abdel Fattah al-Burhan, Rapid Support Forces leader Hemedti and several other RSF officials (Hussein Barsham and Al-Tijani Karshoum) and the Al-Bara' ibn Malik Battalion over human rights violations in the Sudanese civil war (2023–present).
- 10 November — Flag carrier Qantas confirms plans to cut 850 corporate jobs in Australia from 2027 as part of an outsourcing agreement with tech firm Accenture.
- 11 November — Retailer David Jones's receivers confirm plans to shut down 19 stores nationwide along with its sole New Zealand store by Christmas 2026 to make the business more sustainable to sell.
- 15 November – The Philippines and Australia sign an upgraded defence agreement.
- 17 November — Quad Leaders' Summit is held in Manila.
- 18 November:
  - Australia announces new sanctions against Israeli activists and entities for "illegal settlement growth" in the West Bank.
  - Youth fashion retailer General Pants Co. goes into voluntary administration after 54 years of operation.
- 20 November — Prime Minister Anthony Albanese meets with Chinese leaders Xi Jinping and Li Qiang at the APEC Leaders' Meeting in Shenzhen and Beijing.

=== Future and scheduled events ===
- 28 November – 2026 Victorian state election

== Sport ==
- 16 January – Olympic snowboarder Belle Brockhoff announces her retirement from competition.
- 1–21 March – 2026 AFC Women's Asian Cup
- 17 March – Marinko Matosevic is barred from sporting activities for four years by the International Tennis Integrity Agency for doping offences between 2018 and 2020.
- 20 March – Olympic swimmer Cameron McEvoy breaks the world record in the 50 m freestyle at the China Open in Shenzhen. He swam 20.88, breaking the world record of 20.91 set by Brazilian César Cielo in 2009.
- 12 April – Sprinter Gout Gout sets the Oceanian and world under-20 record in the 200 metres, with a time of 19.67 seconds (+ 1.7 m/s) during the 2025–26 Australian Athletics Championships.
- 11 June – 19 July – Australia participates at the 2026 FIFA World Cup.
- 5 July – Australia wins the 2026 Women's T20 World Cup after defeating England in the final.
- 4 August – The International Tennis Integrity Agency suspends Nick Kyrgios after he tests positive for cocaine.
- 26 September – The Brisbane Lions defeat the Fremantle Dockers by 7 points in the 2026 AFL Grand Final.
- 4 October – The Sydney Roosters defeat the Newcastle Knights by 19 points to 18 in the 2026 NRL Grand Final.

== Holidays ==
| Holiday | Date | ACT | NSW | NT | QLD | SA | TAS | VIC | WA | Ref. |
|---|---|---|---|---|---|---|---|---|---|---|
| New Year's Day | Thursday 1 January | Yes | Yes | Yes | Yes | Yes | Yes | Yes | Yes | |
| Australia Day | Monday 26 January | Yes | Yes | Yes | Yes | Yes | Yes | Yes | Yes | |
| Royal Hobart Regatta (only observed in certain areas of Tasmania) | Monday 9 February | No | No | No | No | No | Yes | No | No | |
| Labour Day (WA) | Monday 2 March | No | No | No | No | No | No | No | Yes | |
| Public holiday under different names | Monday 9 March | Canberra Day | No | No | No | Adelaide Cup Day | Eight Hours Day | Labour Day | No | |
| Good Friday | Friday 3 April | Yes | Yes | Yes | Yes | Yes | Yes | Yes | Yes | |
| Easter Saturday | Saturday 4 April | Yes | Yes | Yes | Yes | Yes | No | Yes | No | |
| Easter Sunday | Sunday 5 April | Yes | Yes | No | Yes | No | No | Yes | No | |
| Easter Monday | Monday 6 April | Yes | Yes | Yes | Yes | Yes | Yes | Yes | Yes | |
| Easter Tuesday | Tuesday 7 April | No | No | No | No | No | Yes | No | No | |
| ANZAC Day | Saturday 25 April | Yes | Yes | Yes | Yes | Yes | Yes | Yes | Yes | |
| May Day | Monday 4 May | No | No | Yes | Labour Day (QLD) | No | No | No | No | |
| Reconciliation Day | Monday 1 June | Yes | No | No | No | No | No | No | No | |
| Western Australia Day | Monday 1 June | No | No | No | No | No | No | No | Yes | |
| King's Birthday | Monday 8 June | Yes | Yes | Yes | No | Yes | Yes | Yes | No | |
| Picnic Day | Monday 3 August | No | No | Yes | No | No | No | No | No | |
| Royal Queensland Show (Brisbane area only) | Wednesday 12 August | No | No | No | Yes | No | No | No | No | |
| Friday before the AFL Grand Final | Friday TBC | No | No | No | No | No | No | Yes | No | |
| King's Birthday | Monday 28 September | No | No | No | No | No | No | No | Yes | |
| Labour Day | Monday 5 October | Yes | Yes | No | King's Birthday | Yes | No | No | No | |
| Melbourne Cup | Tuesday 3 November | No | No | No | No | No | No | Yes | No | |
| Recreation Day (all parts of Tasmania which do not observe Royal Hobart Regatta) | Monday 2 November | No | No | No | No | No | Yes | No | No | |
| Christmas Eve (from 7:00 p.m. to 12:00 a.m.) | Thursday 24 December | No | No | Yes | Yes | Yes | No | No | No | |
| Christmas Day | Friday 25 December | Yes | Yes | Yes | Yes | Yes | Yes | Yes | Yes | |
| Boxing Day | Monday 28 December | Yes | Yes | Yes | Yes | Yes | Yes | Yes | Yes | |
| New Year's Eve (from 7:00 p.m. to 12:00 a.m.) | Thursday 31 December | No | No | Yes | No | Yes | No | No | No | |

== Deaths ==
=== January ===
- 2 January – Phoenix Spicer, footballer (North Melbourne) (b. 2002)
- 6 January – Ron Boswell, senator (b. 1940)
- 8 January – Loraine Braham, Northern Territory politician (b. 1938)
- 20 January – Marie Bashir, governor of New South Wales (2001–2014) (b. 1930)
- 29 January – Heather Goodall, historian (b. 1950)

=== February ===
- 7 February – John Flanagan, fantasy novelist (b. 1944)
- 17 February – Anna dePeyster, journalist and author (b. 1944)
- 21 February – Daryl Jackson, architect (b. 1937)
- 28 February – Lorraine Bayly, actor (b. 1937)

=== March ===
- 7 March – Jamie Dunn, voice artist (b. 1950)
- 15 March – Ken Cole, basketball player (b. 1943)
- 17 March – Sir Anthony Mason, chief justice of Australia (1987–1995) (b. 1925)
- 21 March – Rhoda Roberts, arts executive (b. 1959)
- 24 March – Mel Schilling, television personality and relationship coach (b. 1972) (died in the United Kingdom)

=== April ===
- 9 April – Jimmy Sullivan, Queensland politician (b. 1982)
- 11 April – John Dalgleish Donaldson, mathematician, father of Queen Mary of Denmark (b. 1941)
- 13 April – Trish Crossin, politician (b. 1956)
- 20 April –
  - Kay Denman, politician (b. 1937)
  - Elisabeth Kirkby, actress and politician (b. 1921)
- 22 April – James Valentine, musician, radio and television presenter (b. 1961)
- 24 April – Gordon Ingate, athlete (b. 1926)
- 26 April – Peter Morris, politician (b. 1932)
- 28 April – Bill Grayden, politician (b. 1920)

=== May ===
- 5 May – Geoff Ablett, footballer (b. 1955)
- 10 May – Legh Davis, South Australian politician (b. 1940)
- 19 May – Peter Hollingworth, Anglican prelate and governor-general (2001–2003) (b. 1935)
- 25 May – Neale Daniher, football player (Essendon) and coach (Melbourne), co-founder of FightMND (b. 1961)

=== June ===
- 7 June – Richard Scolyer, pathologist (b. 1966)
- 19 June – Savabeel, racehorse (b. 2001)
- 24 June – Teena McQueen, politician

=== July ===
- 10 July – Derryn Hinch, media personality and politician (b. 1944)
- 13 July – Sir Sam Neill, actor (b. 1947)
- 29 July – Gordon Green, Australian rules footballer (b. 1925)
- 31 July – Glenn A. Baker, music journalist (b. 1952)

=== August ===
- 7 August – Jim Miller, footballer (b. 1919)
- 8 August – C. J. Binks, writer and teacher (b. 1931)
- 10 August – Russell Jack, founder of the Golden Dragon Museum (b. 1935)

=== September ===
- 4 September – Steve Gollschewski, police officer, Queensland police commissioner (b. 1959)
- 8 September – Blanche d'Alpuget, writer (b. 1944)
- 10 September – Penny Gillies, hurdler (b. 1951)
- 13 September – Mary Gaudron, High Court judge (b. 1943)
- 19 September – Tim Read, Victoria MLA (b. 1962)
- 21 September –
  - Angry Anderson, singer-songwriter (b. 1947)
  - Terry Denton, children's author and illustrator (b. 1950)

=== October ===
- 1 October – Hilary McPhee, publisher (b. 1941)
- October – Neil Andrew, federal politician and former Speaker of the Australian House of Representatives (b. 1944)
- 6 October – Richard Morecroft, newsreader and television presenter (b. 1956)
- 13 October – John Price, New South Wales politician (b. 1939)
- 17 October – Alan Cribb, botanist (b. 1925).
- 23 October – Daniel Stewart, Australian rules footballer (b. 1988)
- 26 October – Keith Boardman, biochemist (b. 1926)

=== November ===
- 5 November – Alan Jones, racing driver (b. 1946)
- 10 November –
  - Ryan Ghietti, rugby league player (b. 1989)
  - Todd Russell, miner (b. 1972)
- 18 November –
  - Sharman Stone, politician (b. 1951)
  - Jordan Brunoli, bass guitarist (b. 1995)
- 21 November – Fred Nile, Christian minister and politician (b. 1934)
