= Rona Tranby Trust =

The Rona Tranby Trust is an Australian-based not-for-profit organisation established in September 1991 to support the recording and preservation of Indigenous Australian oral history. This includes the granting of Awards to Indigenous Australian elders, organisations and community groups.

Rona Tranby Trust projects are selected and grants awarded through the Rona Tranby Award & Collection. Between 1991 and 2012 the Rona Tranby Award & Collection has funded projects across Australia. The Rona Tranby Award & Collection is managed by Music & Opera Singers Trust Limited (MOST®).

== Rona Tranby Award Recipients ==
Year	Award Recipient	Project
1992	The Western Heritage Group	Yamakarra! Liza Kennedy and the Keewong Mob
1994	Silvia Scott with Di Ritch and the Mac Silva Centre	Stories of residents at the Mac Silva Centre
1996	Kath Mills with Barbara Mills and Barbara Malarndirri McCarthy	Interviewing Lily Kruger on Country Lily Kruger, with the Stolen Generation Litigation Unit of the North Australian Aboriginal Legal Aid Service, Northern Territory (Australia)
1998	Isabel Flick AM with Heather Goodall PhD	Isabel Flick: the many lives of an extraordinary Aboriginal woman
1998	Kevin Cook with Heather Goodall PhD	Making Change Happen: Black & White activists talk to Kevin Cook about Aboriginal, Union & Liberation Politics
2000	Older Women's Network (NSW) Aboriginal Support Network	Steppin' Out and Speakin' Up: The Stories of 15 remarkable Aboriginal women
2001	Northern Territory Archives Service with Francis Good	Interviews with Anmatjere Elders Big Billy Woods, Ted Carter and Eric Panana
2002	Elverina Johnson	Blow 'im: The Yarrabah Brass Band Story
2006	Beryl Carmichael, with Jennie Kerr	The Footsteps of a Ngiyeempaa Elder
2007	Max Dulumunmun Harrison, with Peter McConchie	My People's Dreaming: An Aboriginal Elder speaks on life, land, spirit and forgiveness
2008	Albert Williams with Julie Cracknell, Hetti Perkins and Nigel Parbury	Once Upon a Long Ago: My life in the bush and the city
2012	Yidumduma Bill Harney with Paul Taylor and the YDP	Yubulyawan Dreaming Project: Indigenous wisdom of a Wardaman Elder
