= Collarenebri Aboriginal Cemetery =

- Location within New South Wales Location within Australia
- 29°32′39″S 148°37′25″E
- Location: Gundabloui Road, Collarenebri, Walgett Shire, New South Wales, Australia

History
- Built: 1907–

Site notes
- Owner: Collarenebri Local Aboriginal Land Council

New South Wales Heritage Register
- Official name: Collarenebri Aboriginal Cemetery
- Type: State heritage (landscape)
- Designated: 19 December 2014
- Reference no.: 1934
- Type: Ceremonial site
- Category: Aboriginal

The Collarenebri Aboriginal Cemetery is a heritage-listed cemetery and ceremonial site for Indigenous Australians located at Gundabloui Road, Collarenebri in the Orana region of New South Wales, Australia. It was built from 1907. The property is owned by Collarenebri Local Aboriginal Land Council. The site was added to the New South Wales State Heritage Register on 19 December 2014.

== History ==
In her study of the Collarenebri Aboriginal Cemetery Heather Goodall noted that, prior to the occupation of the land by British settlers, traditional burial practice included placing the remains of the deceased within hollow trees and marking these trees with "elegant, concentric designs" particular to various areas. "This practice became more difficult under the surveillance of white settlers. Burial was more common, with some buried in moorillas or gravelly ridges but others buried in soft ground, in the sandhills along watercourses." In the North West burials were generally "in small cluster". The practices of burial within family groups and active tending of gravesites continued despite the invasion of Europeans and accompanying disruption of traditional culture.

The establishment of an Aboriginal camp on a lagoon east of Collarenebri led to the development of a burial ground in which the local people could maintain the graves of departed loved ones. The death of an infant named Myrum Mundy in 1907 led to the development of a burial ground much closer to the camp. The racial segregation actively imposed in Collarenebri reinforced the desire of Aboriginal people to maintain their own cemetery. The separation of this cemetery from the town cemetery 'allowed the community the freedom to mourn and remember their dead in their own way'.

The cemetery is laid out in patterns that reflect the relationships between groups of people within the Aboriginal community and reflects patterns of community and mourning. Heather Goodall noted Aboriginal community leader Isabel Flick's view of the cemetery 'as a collective testament, laying out, in the most concrete way, her community's relationships with each other and with their place, the land on which Collarenebri stands, their country'. Rituals of mourning practiced at Collarenebri include the elaborate process of burning and shattering glass bottles to provide covering and decoration for the graves. Bottles and jars with glass of an appropriate colour is carefully selected for each grave. These receptacles are washed and dried and a fire lit within a pit excavated for the purpose. Once the fire has burnt to hot coals the receptacles are carefully placed on the hot bed and covered with more coals and ashes. "They are left for an hour or so, then removed with a long handled shovel and then quickly plunged into cold water, so that the glass crazes with tiny internal cracks. Isabel described it as "crystalising" and this sense of turning ordinary glass into something special, an alchemy which makes it into "crystal" conveys the beautiful effect and intention. Only then are the bottles carefully placed between hessian bags and struck to break them into regular pieces, large or small depending on each family's preference, and packed densely onto the top of the grave. When regularly maintained and replenished, the glass forms an impenetrable cover, keeping weeds from growing on the grave and protecting it from disturbance by animals or weather. But it is not only for protection. On approaching the graves from any direction, the "crystalled" glass catches the light, sparkling like water'.

Careful tending and decoration of graves is a practice first recorded at Keera near Bingara in 1857. The use of "crystalled" glass has been noted at Euraba, Toomelah, Goondabluie, Angledool and Dungalear. Unbroken and broken bottles have also been noted on early graves at Goodooga and Burra Bee Dee. Families relocated from Angledool to Brewarrina in the 1830s introduced the use of "crystalled" glass in their own mourning practice. Goodall suggests that the use of "crystalled" glass was a progression from the earlier practice of decorating graves with carefully selected pebbles. She noted a possible progression in the use of grave adornments at Angledool and at Dungalear and suggests that the use of glass at Angledool may date from 1912 when the government station was established there. She also noted that the practice of "cooking" the glass in pits is reminiscent of traditional cooking methods.

The practise of other traditions is also evident at Collarenebri. These include the requirement that graves be dug by hand and that the digging be done by members of the community not immediately connected with the deceased. Preferably the grave is dug in one day. Graves are also arranged in order that the deceased will "be with their mob". Families are grouped together and graves are decorated thematically to identify family ties. People with incomplete or disputed connections to the Collarenebri community have traditionally been buried in the north-eastern section of the cemetery. Long before her death community leader Isabel Flick and her partner Ted Thorne determined that they would be buried "just beyond the "strangers" place". Isabel clearly stated that this was a deliberate gesture aimed to gather the strangers into the wider community. It was a gesture that reflects her life of activism to achieve justice for the Aboriginal community.

The Aboriginal community of Collarenebri began agitating for improved access to the cemetery from the 1970s and in the early 1980s Mangankali, the Collarenebri Aboriginal Housing company refused to accept any further funding for its building program until the cemetery was provided with an all weather road. This was achieved in 1983 and the road later named Bel's Way in recognition of the huge impact of Isabel Flick on the Collarenebri community.

The issue of land tenure was also raised from the late 1970s. Isabel Flick commenced negotiations with the holder of a Western Lands Lease on the property, Mrs Copeman, including the two cemetery sites and former camp site while Mangankali brokered negotiations to have Aboriginal title to the three sites recognised. In 1982 a formal recognition of Aboriginal interest in the three portions was agreed between the Western Lands Commission, Aboriginal Lands Trust and Mrs Copeman. Following extensive negotiations between the Collarenebri LALC and Mrs Copeman the three designated portions were excised from Mrs Copeman's lease and dedicated as vacant Crown land. A land claim under the Land Rights Act was subsequently submitted for these portions. On 27 May 1996 three portions of land within Western Lands Lease WLL5739 incorporating the Collarenebri Aboriginal burials were granted to the Collarenebri Local Aboriginal Land Council.

== Description ==
The Collarenebri Aboriginal Cemetery is situated within Portion 65 of the Parish of Collarindabri in the Finch County. The cemetery is fenced and contains a large number of graves which are generally decorated with shattered glass and objects relevant to the lives and interests of the persons remembered there. Graves are arranged on various alignments determined by the origins of the deceased, family groupings and community connections. The decoration of the graves is highly unusual and, with the alignment of graves is consistent with Gamilaroi burial practice. The Cemetery also contains a shelter, opensided with a corrugated iron roof where piles of coloured glass bottles are stored and a firepit where the glass bottles a "crystalled". Contained within the SHR curtilage of the cemetery is the road, 'Bel's Way' which leads to the cemetery from Gundabloui Road.

The site is considered to be in a good condition.

== Heritage listing ==
The Collarenebri Aboriginal Cemetery, with its uniquely decorated "crystalled" glass graves, is of state heritage significance as a rare and intact and aesthetically distinctive site, demonstrating a technique of grave decoration and remembrance that is unique to north-west NSW. The cemetery and graves provide evidence of the complex development of a living, traditionally based culture which is continuously evolving.

The state heritage significance of the site is enhanced through association with Isabel Flick OAM, who was known throughout the state for her advocacy for indigenous housing and health. She was also integrally involved in the campaign for a Royal Commission into Aboriginal Deaths in Custody and campaigned for equal wages and living conditions for Aboriginal people involved in rural industry. Isabel is buried in the Collarenebri Aboriginal Cemetery. Bel's Way, the access road to the cemetery is named after Isabel who doggedly campaigned for the roadway to be built and upgraded. Her memory is also commemorated by the erection of a statue of Isabel at the gate to the cemetery.

In addition, the cemetery (with its layout reflecting the associations between family and community members; its use of "crystalled" glass; and the ongoing practice of making the glass) has the unique ability to clearly demonstrate burial practices which reflect the melding of traditional Aboriginal culture and technologies with new European materials. The community has maintained traditions, while also developing new ways to memorialise death.

Collarenebri Aboriginal Cemetery was listed on the New South Wales State Heritage Register on 19 December 2014 having satisfied the following criteria.

The place is important in demonstrating the course, or pattern, of cultural or natural history in New South Wales.

The item is l of local heritage significance as it has been used by the Murri's of Collarenebri as a burial ground since 1907 when baby Hyrum Mundy was buried there. It replaced a former burial site located near the old Aboriginal Reserve a further distance from town, which was established in 1899.

The existence of a cemetery for Aborigianl people and its location away from the township cemetery reflects the history of segregation in the town

It also demonstrates the resilience of the local Aboriginal community who rather than acceding to European practises, developed new ways to express traditional mourning and burial practises that echo and adapt practises that predate European settlement.

The place has a strong or special association with a person, or group of persons, of importance of cultural or natural history of New South Wales's history.

The Collarenebri Aboriginal Cemetery is of state heritage significance for its important, direct association with Aboriginal activist, Isabel Flick, who is buried in the Collarenebri Aboriginal Cemetery. Flick is well regarded throughout the state for her work establishing Mangankali Corp which worked to secure funding for housing for indigenous people. She was a tireless campaigner for equal wages for Aboriginal people, for better living and working conditions for Aboriginal people working in rural industries and worked for many years in Sydney and the state as a community health worker and at Tranby Aboriginal College. The road leading to the cemetery, Bel's Way, is named after Flick and a memorial statue of the loved Aunty is situated at the entry to the cemetery.

The place is important in demonstrating aesthetic characteristics and/or a high degree of creative or technical achievement in New South Wales.

The cemetery is of state heritage significance for its aesthetic qualities, being the most intact demonstration of a technique of grave decoration and remembrance that is unique to north-west NSW. The technique of making "crystalled" glass to form the particular shattered effect is a creative innovation that results in a distinctive grave decoration that has landmark qualities.

Additionally, the clustering and alignment of the graves according to family groupings is a unique expression of the associations of the people buried there, along with the use of specific coloured glass by particular families.

Therefore, this site is an important representation of a unique artform and cultural record, meeting the criteria for state heritage.

The place has a strong or special association with a particular community or cultural group in New South Wales for social, cultural or spiritual reasons.

The item is locally significant for its association with the local Aboriginal community at Collarenebri. The strong feelings for the place by the community; they express the universal need to draw on ritual and community to mourn and come to terms with death.

The place has potential to yield information that will contribute to an understanding of the cultural or natural history of New South Wales.

The layout of the graves, the use of "crystalled" glass, and the ongoing practice of preparing glass for grave decoration illustrate burial practices that combine traditional Aboriginal culture with materials introduced by European settlers.

The place possesses uncommon, rare or endangered aspects of the cultural or natural history of New South Wales.

The Collarenebri Aboriginal Cemetery is of state heritage significance as it is the most intact of one of only six sites in NSW in which the use of "crystalleded" glass has been recorded. It is possibly the only Aboriginal cemetery that still continues to decorate graves with "crystalled" glass as an ongoing ritual ofmemoralising the dead.

The place is important in demonstrating the principal characteristics of a class of cultural or natural places/environments in New South Wales.

The Collarenebri Aboriginal Cemetery is of state heritage significance for its representative values as an example of the process in which a marganilised Aboriginal community has been able to maintain traditions and develop new techniques to mark the transition to death and memory.

The site is of local significance for its association with the Murri community of Collarenderri and its ongoing management by the community.
