= 2026 Lake Cargelligo shootings =

Spree shootings in New South Wales, Australia

- Location: Lake Cargelligo, New South Wales, Australia
- Date: 22 January 2026 c. 4:30 p.m. (AEDT)
- Attack type: Spree shootings, mass shooting, domestic violence (suspected)
- Weapon: Shotgun
- Deaths: 5 (including an unborn baby and the suspect)
- Injuries: 1
- Motive: Under investigation
- Accused: Julian Ingram

On 22 January 2026, a shooting spree occurred at two locations in Lake Cargelligo, New South Wales, Australia. Four people were killed, including an unborn baby, and another was critically injured. The suspect fled the scene. A badly decomposed body believed to be the suspect's was found beside a firearm in remote bushland on 11 May. Police later confirmed the body was that of the suspect's.

== Shootings ==
At 4:30 p.m., emergency services responded to reports of a shooting on Bokhara Street. Police officers from the Central West Police District arrived and discovered a woman and a man inside of a vehicle suffering from gunshot wounds. Both were treated, but died at the scene. Police also responded to Walker Street after reports of a second shooting where a woman and a teenager were reportedly shot in their driveway. The woman was pronounced dead on scene, while the man was transported to hospital in critical but stable condition. The teenager who was shot told Nine News that the suspect shot the woman in the neck and head while laughing before shooting him. Witnesses said the shooter was firing from inside of a vehicle while ramming into things. He fled the scene in a Ford Ranger with council signage and is at large.

The shootings occurred on the same day as the national day of mourning for the victims of the 2025 Bondi Beach attack that killed 15 people. Earlier in the week, Australian politicians fast-tracked reforms to tighten gun control and hate crime laws, voting for a national gun buyback program, tighter background checks for firearms licences and laws to allow for the banning of organisations deemed hateful.

== Victims ==
The deceased victims were identified as 25-year-old Sophie Quinn, her 50-year-old aunt Nerida Quinn, and 32-year-old John Harris. Sophie Quinn was seven-months pregnant with her unborn son, Troy Quinn, and was due to give birth in March. The survivor was identified as 19-year-old Kaleb Macqueen.

== Suspect ==
The suspect was identified as a 37-year-old Julian Ingram. He is described as being Aboriginal/Torres Strait Islander appearance, about 165cm-170cm tall, of a medium build with short dark hair and brown eyes. He was a council gardener who worked as a weed officer. He was known to police and was under an apprehended violence order for several domestic violence-related offences. He was granted bail in November 2025 after he was charged with stalking and intimidation with intent to cause physical fear or harm, common assault, and property damage worth less than $2,000. He did not have a New South Wales firearm license, but had access to firearms.

== Manhunt ==
Overnight, a number of specialist police personal were flown in by PolAir and the Defence Force, including Tactical Operations Unit (TOU), Negotiators, and Homicide investigators. The officers joined the large-scale search. More than 100 police in the area supported the search. Police helicopters circled the town throughout the night. Police searched properties, trying to find the suspect. He was last seen driving out of the town. A photo of his truck was taken by the witness. There was also an unconfirmed sighting of him in Mount Hope on January 25. On 11 May, wildlife officers out eradicating feral pests discovered a body they believed was Ingram's beside an abandoned ute 50 kilometres (31 mi) north-west of where the murders happened. The police said the body was in a very decomposed state and was wearing the same clothes. Assistant commissioner Andrew Holland said they confirmed they found a firearm next to the body and a confirmed vehicle driven by Ingram.

== Reactions ==
Local state politician Roy Butler called the shootings "tragic" and "devastating". New South Wales premier Chris Minns said gun violence was a "big issue" and said he trusted the police to apprehend the suspect. Lachlan Shire mayor John Metcalf said the deaths were a "crying shame" and unexpected. The victims were honoured at the Invasion Day Rally in Hyde Park, Sydney. Several floral tributes were placed near a power pole outside one of the crime scenes. Storefronts were temporarily closed in the town.

== Investigation ==
Crime scenes were established at the scenes and are being forensically examined. Strike Force Doberta was established to investigate the circumstances surrounding the incident. Police are not treating the shootings as terror-related. The Sydney Morning Herald reported that they were a suspected domestic violence attack, and that one of the victims is believed to be the shooter's former partner. The Daily Telegraph reported the other victims were two of her relatives and her friend.

== See also ==
- List of mass shootings in Australia
- Crime in New South Wales
- 2026 in Australia
