= Killing of Kumanjayi Little Baby =

2026 killing in Australia

- Location: Alice Springs, Northern Territory, Australia
- Date: Between 25 and 30 April 2026
- Target: Kumanjayi Little Baby
- Attack type: Kidnapping; Murder
- Deaths: 1
- Accused: Jefferson Lewis
- Charges: Murder; Sexual assault (2 counts)

On 25 April 2026, a five-year-old Aboriginal Australian girl, known posthumously as Kumanjayi Little Baby for cultural reasons, was abducted from one of the town camps at Alice Springs in the Northern Territory. Her body was discovered five days later on 30 April 2026.

The abduction was initially treated as a missing person case and sparked major search efforts near Alice Springs. Simultaneously, police conducted a manhunt for Jefferson Lewis, a distant relative and recently released prisoner, who was the last person seen with the child. Lewis was located at another town camp on 30 April, where police and paramedics rescued him from a severe beating. Riots subsequently broke out in Alice Springs involving individuals who sought to punish Lewis under Indigenous Australian customary law.

On 2 May 2026, Lewis was charged with murder and two counts of sexual assault.

== Victim ==
Kumanjayi Little Baby was a Gurindji-Warlpiri girl who was five years old at the time of her death. Her name, Sharon Granites, was published in media while she was a missing person but, after her death and in accordance with Aboriginal cultural practices for the deceased, her family requested that she be referred to as "Kumanjayi Little Baby".

Kumanjayi Little Baby was from a large and well-known Central Australian family, with her extended family including Robin Granites Japanangka and other contemporary Indigenous Australian artists, as well as politicians Bess Price, and Country Liberal Party senator Jacinta Nampijinpa Price. Senator Price, who described Kumanjayi Little Baby as her niece, wrote that she would use "Kumanjayi Little Baby" in "appropriate cultural settings" but that she would also use Kumanjayi Little Baby's birth name "to ensure she is not reduced to a statistic".

Kumanjayi Little Baby was raised by her parents and extended family and had an older brother. She and her family had been subject to multiple child protection notifications, all related to alleged domestic violence from her father upon her mother. He was in prison at the time of her death on aggravated assault and domestic violence charges. Her family is originally from the remote communities Kalkarindji and Yuendumu, but had lived in other places, and moved Ilyperenye Old Timers, a town camp on the southern outskirts of Alice Springs, so that they could access medical specialists for Kumanjayi Little Baby, in town. The condition of housing at the camp was poor, with limited services available and residences shared between extended family members.

According to relatives, Kumanjayi Little Baby was unable to talk and communicated mostly through hand gestures.

== Abduction and search ==
Kumanjayi Little Baby was reported missing at 1:30 am on 26 April 2026. Witnesses subsequently reported that she had last been seen at 11 pm on 25 April holding hands with Jefferson Lewis, a member of her extended family who had been staying in the same residence at Ilyperenye Old Timers.

Kumanjayi Little Baby's disappearance sparked extensive search efforts by the Northern Territory Police and around 300 volunteers, with around 5 square kilometres (1.9 mi^{2}) covered on foot and 80 square kilometres (31 mi^{2}) covered by vehicle and air. Police initially believed Kumanjayi Little Baby may have been abandoned in bushland after her abduction. Later on 26 April, police located Lewis's shirt, a child's underwear, and a doona cover in the dry bed of the Todd River. A crime scene was declared at the site and an order was issued for Lewis's arrest. Forensic testing found traces of both Kumanjayi Little Baby's and Lewis's DNA on the underwear.

On 30 April 2026, police announced that Kumanjayi Little Baby's body had been found by a search party. A cause of death was not initially reported but police were treating her death as a homicide.

== Manhunt and capture ==
The search for Lewis was reportedly one of the Northern Territory Police's biggest manhunts. It was hampered by his lack of a digital footprint, with police doorknocking areas in Alice Springs and searching other remote communities in the Northern Territory and Western Australia. It was reported that he may have been assisted in evading police by family members.

On 30 April, following the discovery of Kumanjayi Little Baby's body, Lewis was located at the Charles Creek town camp on the outskirts of Alice Springs. A group of residents beat him; he reportedly received an extensive head injury and was rendered unconscious. Martin Dole, the Northern Territory police commissioner, stated that "members of that town camp decided to inflict vigilante justice upon Jefferson and we received numerous phone calls saying he was in the process of being assaulted". Emergency services arrived at the camp and he was moved to an ambulance with assistance from police, subsequently being driven to Alice Springs Hospital. The police and ambulance officers who attended the arrest were attacked, with around 200 people in attendance.

== Aftermath and reaction ==
=== Rioting and looting ===
After Lewis's arrest, a crowd of around 400 people gathered outside of Alice Springs Hospital, reportedly demanding that Lewis be surrendered for "payback" under customary law. Lewis was subsequently transferred to Royal Darwin Hospital for his own safety, after being beaten unconscious by a group of men.

At Alice Springs Hospital, members of the crowd threw rocks, bottles and other projectiles at the police and their vehicles. A police car was set on fire and four out of five ambulances at the hospital were rendered inoperable. Rioting reportedly lasted for five hours. The scene was attended by riot police who used tear gas and pepper spray to disperse the crowd. Rioting subsequently spread elsewhere in Alice Springs, with a nearby service station ransacked and looted, and multiple fires lit in bushland and skip bins. The cost of the damages was A$200,000.

The following day, Kumanjayi Little Baby's family appealed for calm, saying that justice would be served by the police and judicial system.

=== Political commentary ===
The killing sparked a broader political debate around conditions in Alice Springs town camps, government policy on Indigenous affairs, and the operations of the child protection and criminal justice systems in the Northern Territory.

Former Liberal prime ministers Tony Abbott and John Howard, along with the current opposition leader, Angus Taylor, said that conditions in the town camps needed to be looked at. Abbott wrote in The Australian that culture was "getting in the way" of addressing Indigenous disadvantage. A number of commentators called for an independent inquiry or royal commission to be convened, while others believed her killing was being politicised and it was inappropriate to debate the issue while her family was grieving. Discussions frequently mentioned the Little Children are Sacred report of 2007 into child sexual abuse of Aboriginal children and the controversial Northern Territory National Emergency Response which resulted.

On 12 May 2026 Senator Jacinta Nampijinpa Price, Kumanjayi Little Baby's relative, presented a eulogy in the Senate and implored Australians to address the plight of Aboriginal children. She used Kumanjayi Little Baby's birth name, saying she wanted it read into the official records so she would not just become another statistic.

=== Government responses ===
It was found that the child had been the subject of six child protection notifications, though it was unclear if the concerns raised in the notifications had been substantiated or investigated. On 6 May 2026, Northern Territory child protection minister Robyn Cahill announced that three Department of Children and Families workers had been stood down pending an investigation of their handling of welfare notifications in respect of Kumanjayi Little Baby's family. She expressed concern that child protection workers had been reluctant to remove children from Aboriginal families given the legacy of the Stolen Generations.

An interim review of the NT child protection department found that it failed to act in a timely manner, and the cumulative impact of her and her brother being around family violence was not "adequately recognised".

In July the NT overhauled its child protection law, adding a two year time limit on protection orders in favour of permanent placements, a "universal principle" where every child's culture is taken into account when finding foster placements, but weakens the right for an Aboriginal child's family to identify a preferred carer among other changes. Minister Robyn Cahill, said that "We are intervening earlier, backing families to turn things around, and keeping Aboriginal children connected to kin and culture where it is safe to do so." It was criticised by Aboriginal leaders, legal groups, children's advocates and human rights organisations for being rushed, not consulting with Aboriginal leaders, ignoring evidence that the issues were in budget and implementation, not law, and weakening the Aboriginal Child Placement Principle, which aims keep children within their cultural communities and of politicising Kumanjayi Little Baby's death.

The government linked to the changes to Kumanjayi Little Baby's death, but legislation was first floated in 2025.

=== Vigils ===
Vigils were held for the little girl around Australia on 7 May 2026, including a large gathering at the Aborigines Advancement League in Melbourne and at the Aboriginal Tent Embassy in Canberra. The family and advocates said that her death should not be politicised.

=== Funeral ===
The funeral was held on the 15th of August 2026. The entire Alice Springs community was invited, and mourners wore pink, her favourite colour.

== Accused ==
Image of Jefferson Lewis released by NT Police during the manhunt

Jefferson Lewis is a Warlpiri man who was 47 years old at the time of the child's death. He was originally from the remote community of Lajamanu, Northern Territory. His wife and children lived in Balgo, Western Australia. He had previously worked as an Indigenous ranger under a Central Land Council scheme.

Lewis had an extensive criminal record and had been imprisoned multiple times in the past decade for serious assaults and domestic violence-related offences, although with no prior convictions for offences against children. He was released from prison six days before Kumanjayi Little Baby's abduction, after being sentenced to 18 months imprisonment in October 2024 for aggravated assault, domestic violence offences, and breaching bail. His prison sentence was subsequently extended by three months on separate convictions of contravening a domestic violence order and resisting police. Lewis's earlier prison sentences included 12 months in 2016 for aggravated assault, 19 months in 2018 for aggravated assault and other charges, and 11 months in 2022 for aggravated assault.

After being released from prison, Lewis was directed to join family members in Lajamanu, with a request to live in Yuendumu reportedly being denied over concerns from community members. He instead travelled to Alice Springs to stay with extended family at the Ilyperenye Old Timers camp. He stayed in several different dwellings at the camp. According to residents of the camp, he had acted "strangely" in the days prior to the incident, and was unusually quiet, also drinking heavily.

=== Charges ===
On 2 May 2026, Lewis was charged with murder and two counts of sexual assault. He was remanded to appear in the Darwin Local Court on 5 May 2026.

== See also ==
- Aboriginal deaths in custody
- Australian Aboriginal kinship systems
- 2026 Invasion Day protest bombing attempt
- Little Children are Sacred
- Stolen Generations
