= Jews Against the Occupation ʻ48 =

Australian Jewish organisation

- Abbreviation: JAO48
- Founded: 2003
- Type: Protest group
- Headquarters: Sydney
- Website: jao48australia.org

Jews Against the Occupation ’48 (JAO48) is an Australian anti-Zionist Jewish organization based in Sydney, founded in 2003. It has held various protests against Israel and the Gaza war.

== History ==
Jews Against the Occupation ’48 was founded in 2003 in Sydney as an anti-Zionist protest group. In an interview with World Socialist Web Site, member of the group Michelle Berkon explained that it was initially founded under the name Jews Against the Occupation and focused on Israel's military occupation of West Bank, Gaza Strip and the Golan Heights. The group's ideology later shifted, completely rejecting the existence of Israel since 1948 and changing its name to Jews Against the Occupation ’48.

== Activities ==
On March 25, 2025, JAO48 along with six other jewish groups released a statement calling for Australia to impose sanctions against Israel. On September 7, 2025, JAO48 organized a protest at Bondi Beach in support of the 2025 Global Sumud Flotilla. The protest was immediately condemned by Australian Jewish Association, who stated in a post on X: “The Jewish community is not going to sit by and allow a bunch of trouble makers to bring their hate to Bondi Beach”. The organization endorsed a counter-protest at the beach by pro-Israel organization StandWithUs. During the protest, a scuffle broke out between two groups, in the course of which the parties exchanged punches.

On January 8, 2026, JAO48 along with other groups, filed a challenge against new laws restricting protests in New South Wales after terrorist attacks at the Supreme Court of New South Wales. On January 17, 2025, JAO48 held a protest in Sydney against planned visit of Israeli President Isaac Herzog. Reportedly, hundreds of people attended the protest.

On October 7, 2026, JAO48 held a pro-Palestine demonstration in Sydney called “Vigil for Gaza”, during which a protester was seen waving a poster of former Hamas leader Yahya Sinwar. The demonstration was condemned by Premier of New South Wales Chris Minns, who called it “heartless”. Spokesperson of JAO48 Michelle Berkon said the demonstration was a "solemn and peaceful vigil to commemorate the beginning of Israel's genocide against the Palestinians". In a post on X, JAO48 said that the demonstration was held to protest to “retaliatory airstrikes” conducted by Israel during October 7 attacks.
