= Australia Day debate =

Public debate about the date of Australia Day

Australia Day is Australia's national day, marking the landing of the First Fleet under Captain Arthur Phillip at Sydney Cove, and the raising of the British Union Jack, in 1788. After the federation of Australia on 1 January 1901, the official recognition and dates of Australia Day by that name, and its corresponding holiday, emerged gradually. Further alternations and alternatives have been proposed for debate, but none officially agreed to or adopted.

26 January was previously recognised by different names (prior to 1946) and as a regionally-specific date lacking national recognition (prior to 1935). Historically, "Australia Day" public holidays were held on different dates around Australia (such as a movable Monday or Friday for long weekends), with the first being designated as Friday 30 July 1915, as fundraising for the First World War effort.

There have also been proposals to institute a second day specifically for Indigenous Australians in addition to the existing date, which is often referred to as Invasion Day by opponents. Polling has shown a marked shift towards support for a change of date or second day of celebration since 2000, though around two thirds of respondents in recent years have supported the existing date. Various proposals for the name and date of a new holiday have been put forward.

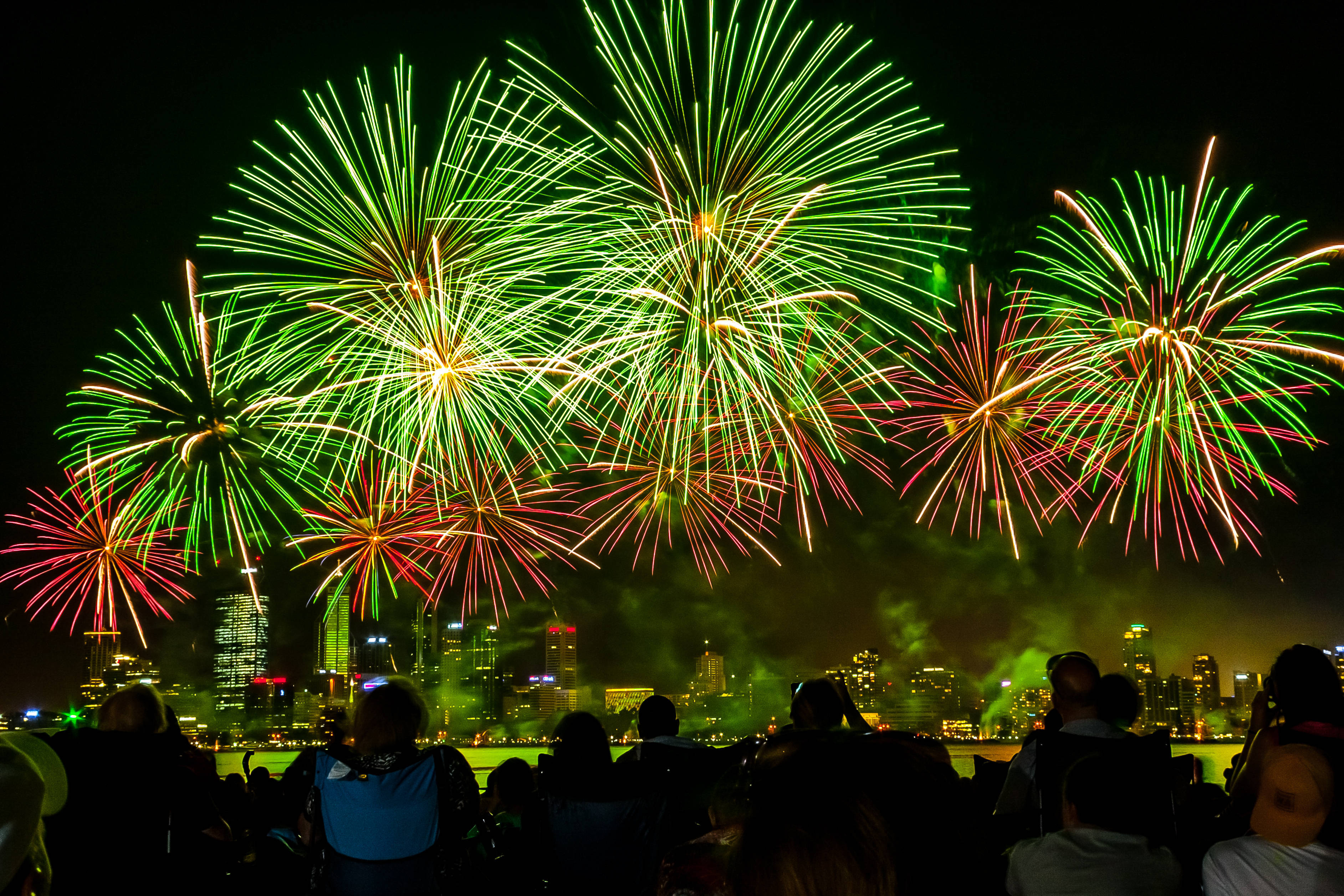
Australia Day fireworks, Perth, 2013

== Reasons for alternative dates ==
Both before the establishment of Australia Day as the national day of Australia, and in the years after its creation, several dates have been proposed for its celebration and, at various times, the possibility of moving Australia Day to an alternative date has been mooted. Some reasons put forward are that the current date, celebrating the foundation of the Colony of New South Wales, lacks national significance; that the day falls during school holidays which limits the engagement of schoolchildren in the event; and that it fails to encompass members of the Indigenous community and some others who perceive the day as commemorating the date of an invasion of their land. Connected to this is the suggestion that moving the date would be seen as a significant symbolic act.

Some Australians regard Australia Day as a symbol of the adverse impacts of British settlement on Australia's Indigenous peoples.

In 1888, prior to the first centennial anniversary of the First Fleet landing on 26 January 1788, New South Wales premier Henry Parkes was asked about inclusion of Aboriginal people in the celebrations. He replied: "And remind them that we have robbed them?"

== Responses ==
=== Protests ===
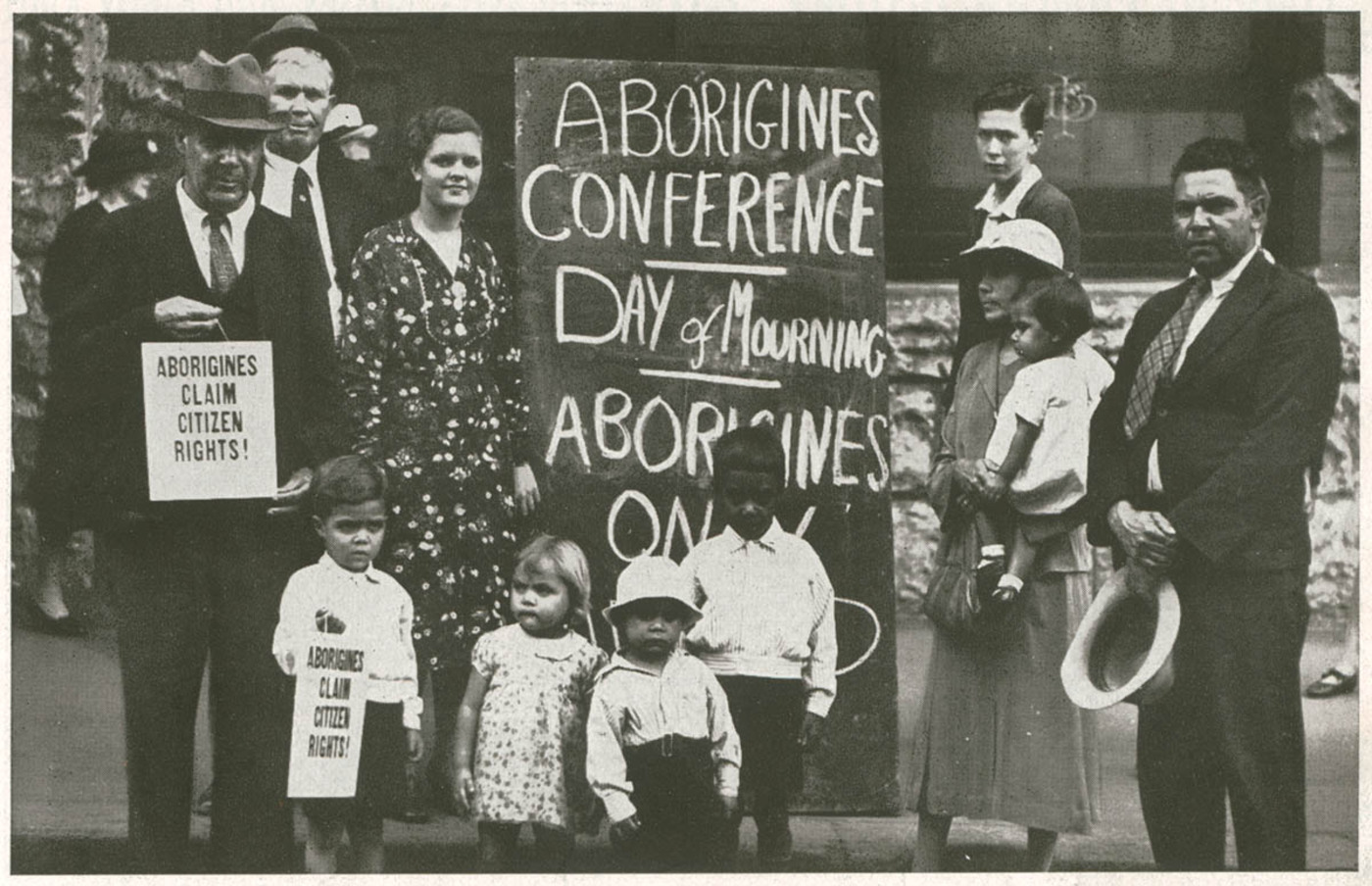
Outside Australian Hall, Sydney, on the 1938 Day of Mourning

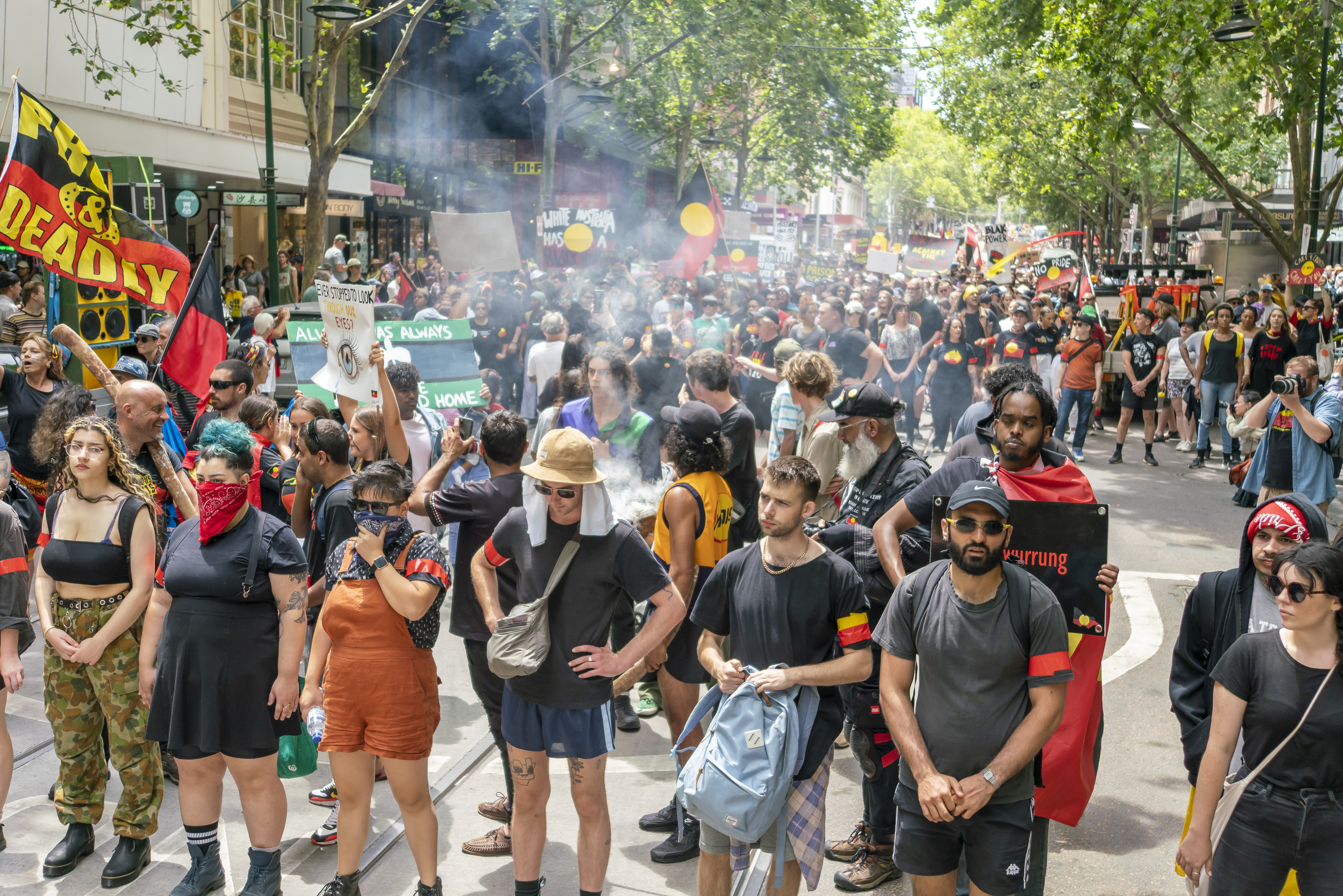
2020 Invasion Day rally in Melbourne

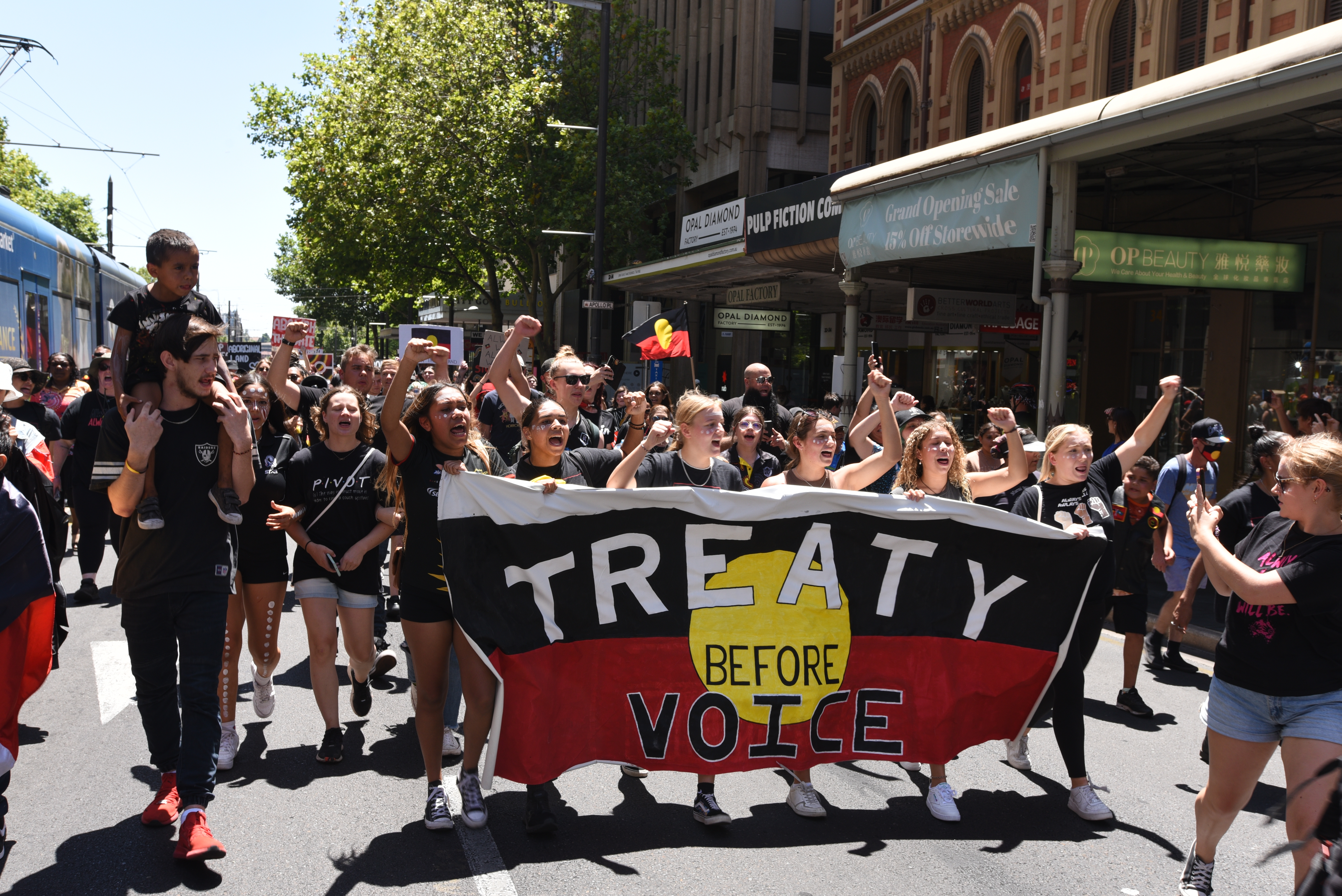
Protesters at the 2023 Invasion Day march in Adelaide

The celebrations in 1938 were accompanied by an Aboriginal Day of Mourning. The Aboriginal Tent Embassy was established outside Old Parliament House, Canberra, on Australia Day in 1972, and celebrated 50 years of existence in 2022.

A large gathering of Aboriginal people in Sydney in 1988 led an "Invasion Day" commemoration marking the loss of Indigenous culture. Some Indigenous figures and others continue to label Australia Day as "Invasion Day", and protests occur almost every year, sometimes at Australia Day events.

Thousands of people participate in protest marches in capital cities on Australia Day. Estimates for the 2018 protest in Melbourne ranged in the tens of thousands, and around 80,000 in 2019, when rallies were also held across the country.

At a 2026 Invasion Day rally in Perth, a failed bombing led to the lone suspect being charged with a terrorist act, the first time in Australia that a terror charge had been laid as a result of an attack on Aboriginal and Torres Strait Islander persons.

=== Political responses ===
A move to change the date would have to be made by a combination of the Australian federal and state governments, and has thus far lacked sufficient political and public support.

In 2001, Prime Minister John Howard stated that he acknowledged Aboriginal concerns with the date, but that it was nevertheless a significant day in Australia's history, and should therefore be retained. In 2009, in response to Mick Dodson's suggestion to reopen the debate, prime minister Kevin Rudd refused to do so, and opposition leader Malcolm Turnbull agreed; however both supported the right of Australians to raise the issue. Also in that year, at state level, NSW premier Nathan Rees and Queensland premier Anna Bligh opposed a change.

In 2018, prime minister Scott Morrison rejected moving Australia Day, proposing the addition of another day for Indigenous Australians instead. Frontbencher Ken Wyatt supported the proposal, suggesting establishing it on a day during NAIDOC Week in July.

In January 2023, Queensland LNP MP Henry Pike drafted a bill that would keep Australia Day on 26 January.

=== Local councils ===
In June 2017 the annual National General Assembly of the Australian Local Government Association voted by a slim majority for councils to consider how to lobby the federal government for a date change. In August 2017 the council of the City of Yarra, in Melbourne, resolved unanimously that it would no longer hold citizenship ceremonies on 26 January and stop referring to it as Australia Day, instead holding an event acknowledging Aboriginal culture and history; the City of Darebin soon followed suit. The federal government immediately deprived the councils of their powers to hold citizenship ceremonies.

On 13 January 2019 prime minister Scott Morrison announced that, with effect from Australia Day 2020, all local councils would be required to hold citizenship ceremonies on and only on 26 January and 17 September. The Inner West Council was the first local authority in Sydney to end Australia Day celebrations, from 2020, while in February 2021 the City of Mitcham became the first local council in South Australia to officially oppose the date of Australia Day.

Following the decision by Woolworths, Big W and Aldi not to stock extra items for Australia Day, Fairfield City Council in Sydney resolved to provide free Australia Day merchandise to residents.

=== Commercial responses ===
In 2023, retail chain Kmart stopped selling Australia Day merchandise, as did Woolworths, Big W and Aldi Süd in 2024, with Woolworths citing a decline in demand and noting that it sells Australian flags all year round. The decision by Woolworths caused some controversy, with opposition leader Peter Dutton calling for a boycott of Woolworths, and vandalism to two stores in Brisbane. The company's CEO noted that the company was not attempting to "cancel" the holiday.

Woolworths Group, owning Woolworths supermarkets and Big W, announced in January 2025 that they would once again sell merchandise for Australia Day and that the national holiday would be celebrated in store. Furthermore, in 2024 the company began stocking the Australian National Flag and the Aboriginal and Torres Strait Islander flags for the entire year.

=== Social media responses ===
Australian celebrities, Australian politicians and Australian political lobby groups have used their influential social media presences to voice support and opposition to changes to Australia day.

A crowdfunded political satire parody advertisement from The Juice Media was distributed via social media in early 2017 in support of changes to Australia Day was subsequently distributed via news media. This advertisement was the subject of a study which analysed the degree of polarisation in comments published in response by proponents and opponents of changes to Australia Day. This study found the interactions between groups with differing positions online increased hostility, whereas interactions within the same ideological group decreased the tentativeness of language used.

In early 2024, Coalition politicians and supporting lobby groups in opposition of changes to Australia Day had funded an overwhelming majority of social media advertisements relating to the Australia Day debate. Australian Labor Party politicians have accused coalition politicians of inciting a culture war and in 2025, attempting to further politicise the Australia Day debate in the lead up to the 2025 Australian federal election.

=== Other responses ===
Among those calling for change have been Tony Beddison, then chairman of the Australia Day Committee (Victoria), who argued for change and requested debate on the issue in 1999; and Mick Dodson, Australian of the Year in 2009, who called for debate as to when Australia Day was held.

In 2016, National Indigenous Television chose the name "Survival Day" as its preferred choice on the basis that it acknowledges the mixed nature of the day, saying that the term "recognises the invasion", but does not allow that to frame the entire story of the Aboriginal people.

The anniversary is also termed by some as "Survival Day" and marked by events such as the Survival Day concert, first held in Sydney in 1992, celebrating the fact that the Indigenous people and culture have survived despite colonisation and discrimination.

== Suggested alternatives ==
=== Abolition ===
Some people call for the abolition of Australia Day altogether, arguing that any day celebrating Australia celebrates colonisation and Indigenous genocide. In his article, "Why I no longer support #changethedate", Luke Pearson wrote, "You want a day to celebrate Australia. I want an Australia that's worth celebrating."

=== 1 January (Federation of Australia) ===
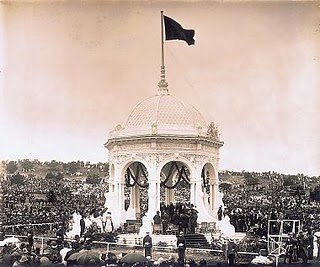
Federation Pavilion, Centennial Park, Sydney, 1 January 1901

As early as 1957, 1 January was suggested as a possible alternative day, to commemorate the Federation of Australia. In 1902, the year after Federation, 1 January was named "Commonwealth Day". However, New Year's Day was already a public holiday, and Commonwealth Day did not gather much support. (But see 19 January and 17 September, below.)

=== 19 January (alternative federation date) ===
Proposed as an alternative because it is only one week earlier than Australia Day and "19/01" can represent the year of Federation.

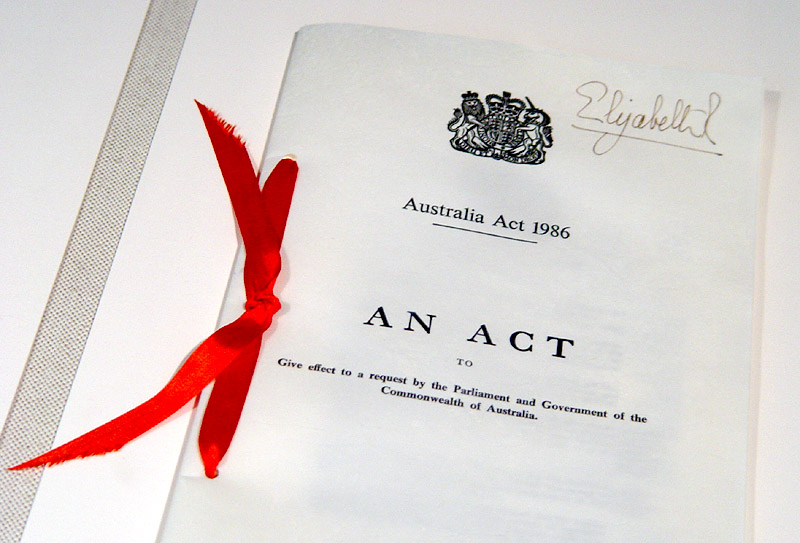
Photo of the Australia Act 1986 document located in Parliament House, Canberra

=== 25 and 26 January (two national days) ===
The Two Australia Day campaign proposes that January 25 should be "First Australians Day" – a mourning for the last unspoiled day of Indigenous life – and that January 26 should be rebranded as "New Australians Day", a day to celebrate Australia's rich history of immigration. This idea was first mooted by activist Noel Pearson, as outlined in an essay published in the 2021 collection Mission. Alan Kohler supported this proposal in his opinion piece published in The New Daily on 25 January 2023.

=== 3 March (Australia Act) ===
There has been support for an "independence day", 3 March, to represent the enacting of the Australia Act 1986.

=== 25 April (Anzac Day) ===
There has been a degree of support by some in recent years for making Anzac Day, 25 April, Australia's national day, including in 1999, by Anglican Archbishop of Brisbane Peter Hollingworth. In 2001, following comments made during a review into the future of Anzac Day, the idea of a merger was strongly opposed by Prime Minister John Howard and Opposition Leader Kim Beazley, who clarified his earlier position.

=== 8 May ("mate") ===
Starting 2017, there has been a partially humorous suggestion to move Australia Day to 8 May. This is primarily because of the homophonous quality between "May 8" and the Australian idiom "mate", but also because the opening of the first Federal Parliament was on 9 May.

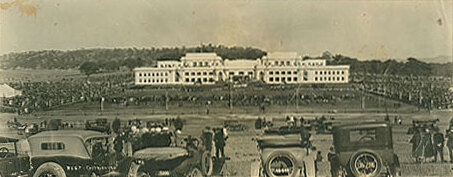
Opening of Parliament House in May 1927

=== 9 May (opening of Provisional Parliament House) ===
The date 9 May is also sometimes suggested, the date on which the first federal seat of parliament was opened in Melbourne in 1901, the date of the opening of the Provisional Parliament House in Canberra in 1927, and the date of the opening of the New Parliament House in 1988. The date has, at various times, found support from former Queensland Premier Peter Beattie, Tony Beddison, and Geoffrey Blainey. However, the date has been seen by some as being too closely connected with Victoria, and its location close to the start of winter has been described as an impediment.

=== 27 May (1967 referendum) ===
The anniversary of the 1967 referendum to amend the federal constitution has also been suggested. The amendments enabled the federal parliament to legislate with regard to Indigenous Australians and allowed for Indigenous Australians to be included in the national census. The public vote in favour was 91%.

=== 9 July (acceptance of the Constitution) ===
This is the date when Queen Victoria accepted the Constitution of Australia.

=== 1 September (Wattle Day) ===
Wattle Day is the first day of spring in the southern hemisphere. Australia's green and gold comes from the wattle, and it has symbolised Australia since the early 1800s. Wattle Day has been proposed as the new date for Australia Day since the 1990s and is supported by the National Wattle Day Association.

=== 8 September ===
This was the day Australia was first circumnavigated, by Matthew Flinders and Bungaree in 1803.

=== 17 September (proclamation of Federation) ===
On 17 September 1900, Queen Victoria issued the proclamation of Federation, with effect from 1 January 1901. As the latter date coincided with New Year, the anniversary of the former has been suggested as an alternative commemoration of Federation and nationhood.

Other events have been cited in support of the same date. On 17 September 1790, Governor Arthur Phillip, instead of punishing Willemering for spearing him 10 days earlier over the kidnapping of Bennelong, met Bennelong and his people with gifts, and with an apology, which Bennelong accepted. And on 17 September 1973, the Nationality and Citizenship Act 1948 was renamed the Australian Citizenship Act, leading to the adoption of 17 September as Australian Citizenship Day since 2001, and the holding of citizenship ceremonies on this day as well 26 January.

=== 24 October (Tenterfield Oration) ===
On 24 October 1889 Sir Henry Parkes, the "Father of Federation", gave his pivotal speech at Tenterfield in NSW, which set the course for federation.

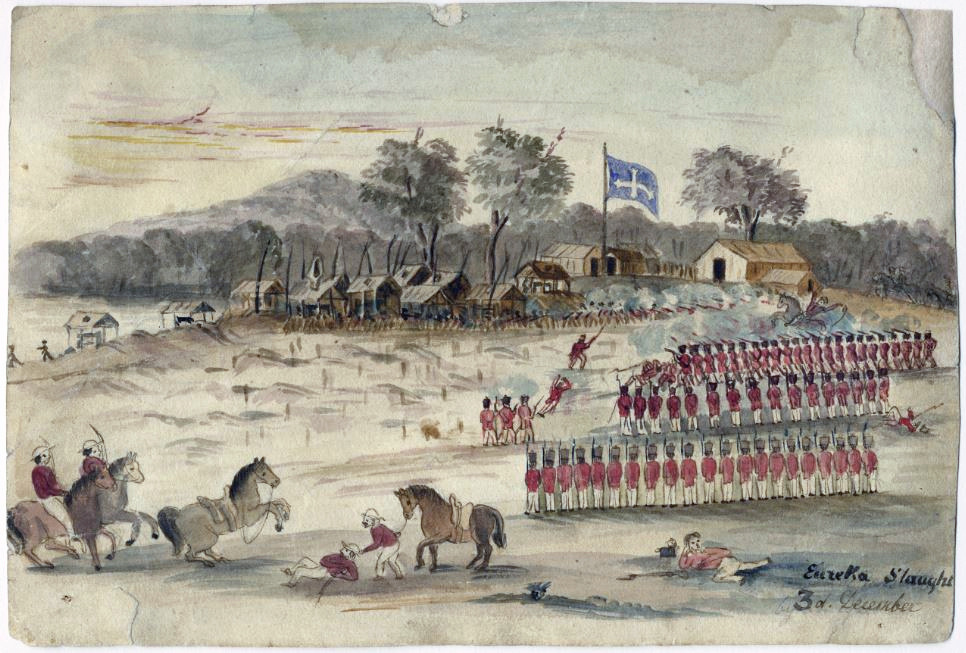
Eureka Slaughter by Charles Doudiet (1854)

=== 3 December (Eureka Stockade) ===
The Eureka Stockade on 3 December has had a long history as an alternative choice for Australia Day, having been proposed by The Bulletin in the 1880s. The Eureka uprising occurred in 1854 during the Victorian gold rush, and saw a failed rebellion by the miners against the Victorian colonial government. Although the rebellion was crushed, it led to significant reforms, and has been described as being the birthplace of Australian democracy. Supporters of the date have included senator Don Chipp and former Victorian Premier Steve Bracks. However, the idea has been opposed by some who see it as an essentially Victorian event.

== Polling ==
=== 2000s ===
In 2004, a Newspoll poll that asked if the date of Australia Day should be moved to one that is not associated with European settlement found 79% of respondents favoured no change, 15% favoured change, and 6% were uncommitted. Historian Geoffrey Blainey said in 2012 that he believed 26 January worked well as Australia Day and that it was at that time more successful than it had ever been.

=== 2010s ===
A January 2017 poll conducted by McNair yellowSquares for The Guardian found that 68% of Australians felt positive about Australia Day, 19% were indifferent and 7% had mixed feelings, with 6% feeling negative about Australia Day. Among Indigenous Australians, however, only 23% felt positive about Australia Day, 31% were negative and 30% had mixed feelings, with 54% favouring a change of date. A September 2017 poll conducted by Essential Polling for The Guardian found that 54% were opposed to changing the date; 26% of Australians supported changing the date and 19% had no opinion.

A poll conducted by progressive public policy think tank The Australia Institute in 2018 found that 56% do not mind what day it is held. The same poll found that 49% believe that the date should not be on a date that is offensive to Indigenous Australians, but only 37% believed the current date was offensive.

Prior to Australia Day 2019, the conservative public policy think tank Institute of Public Affairs (IPA) published the results of a poll in which 75% of Australians wanted the date to stay, while the new nationalist Advance Australia Party's poll had support at 71%. Both groups asked questions about pride in being Australian prior to the headline question.

The Social Research Centre, a subsidiary of the Australian National University, also released a report in January 2019. Their survey found that, when respondents know that 26 January is the anniversary of the arrival of the First Fleet at Port Jackson, 70% believe it is the best date for Australia Day, and 27% believe it is not. The report includes demographic factors which affect people's response, such as age, level of education, and state or territory of residence. Those who did not support 26 January as the best date then indicated their support for an alternative date. The three most supported dates were 27 May, 1 January and 8 May.

=== 2020s ===
Polling by Essential Media conducted each January since 2015 with the exclusion of 2018 suggests that the number of people celebrating Australia Day is declining, indicating a shift in attitudes. In 2019, 40% celebrated the day; in 2020, 34%. In 2021 it was down to 29%, and in that year, 53% said that they were treating the day as just a public holiday.

Proportion of answers to the question posed by Essential Media to 1000+ survey participants: "Will you personally be doing anything to celebrate Australia Day or do you treat it as just a public holiday?"
| Year | Doing something to celebrate Australia day | Just a public holiday | Working - I don't get the Australia Day holiday | Don't know |
|---|---|---|---|---|
| 2015 | 40% | 41% | 7% | 12% |
| 2016 | 38% | 44% | 6% | 12% |
| 2017 | 34% | 46% | 5% | 15% |
| 2018 | - | - | - | - |
| 2019 | 40% | 45% | 6% | 9% |
| 2020 | 34% | 46% | 6% | 14% |
| 2021 | 29% | 53% | 6% | 12% |
| 2022 | 27% | 50% | 7% | 16% |
| 2023 | 30% | 53% | 8% | 9% |
| 2024 | 35% | 55% | 5% | 6% |
| 2025 | 34% | 51% | 6% | 9% |

Polling by Essential Media first conducted in October 2018 and each January since 2019 indicates minimal change in attitude towards replacing or supplementing Australia Day with a separate day to recognise Indigenous Australians.

Proportion of answers to the question posed by Essential Media to 1000+ survey participants: "It has been suggested that Australia should have a separate national day to recognise Indigenous Australians. Do you ...?"
| Year | Support a separate day and keep Australia Day | Support a separate day to replace Australia Day | Do not support a separate day | Don't know |
|---|---|---|---|---|
| 2019 | 37% | 15% | 40% | 8% |
| 2020 | 32% | 18% | 40% | 11% |
| 2021 | 35% | 18% | 35% | 12% |
| 2022 | 37% | 20% | 29% | 14% |
| 2023 | 33% | 26% | 33% | 8% |
| 2024 | 31% | 18% | 40% | 11% |
| 2025 | 30% | 19% | 40% | 11% |

An IPA poll commissioned in December 2020 and published in January 2021 showed that support for changing the date had remained a minority position. In January 2021, an Essential poll reported that 53% supported a separate day to recognise Indigenous Australians; however only 18% of these thought that it should replace Australia Day. A poll by Ipsos for The Age / The Sydney Morning Herald reported in January 2021 that 28% were in support of changing the date, 24% were neutral and 48% did not support changing the date. 49% believed that the date would change within the next decade and 41% believed that selecting a new date would improve the lives of Indigenous Australians. Results were split by demographic factors, with age being a significant factor. 47% of people aged 18–24 supported changing the date, compared to only 19% among those aged 55 years or older. Individuals who voted for the Greens were most likely to support the date change at 67%, followed by Labor voters at 31% and Coalition voters at 23%.

A January 2022 IPA poll found 65% were opposed to changing the date, including 47% of 18–24 year olds, with 15% of the general population and 25% of 18–24 year olds in favour of changing it. However an Essential poll around the same time reported growing support for a change of date or an additional day of celebration for Indigenous Australians, at nearly 60%.

A January 2023 Roy Morgan poll found that 64% said that 26 January should be known as "Australia Day". A majority of respondents under 35 favoured "Invasion Day", as did a majority of Greens supporters. Support for the name "Australia Day" was up across every age group compared to the year prior, with support for the name up by eight percentage points among respondents aged 18–24. Majorities of men, women, capital city residents, country residents, Coalition and Labor supporters and respondents in each state favoured "Australia Day".

A December 2024 Institute of Public Affairs poll found 69% agreed with the statement "Australia Day should be celebrated on January 26".

A January 2025 poll conducted by Resolve Strategic for the Sydney Morning Herald found majority support for legislatively enshrining 26 January as Australia Day, with 52% in support, 24% opposed and 23% neutral, and also found increased support for the date at 61 per cent, compared to 47 per cent in a poll conducted two years prior.

The Deakin Contemporary History Survey, conducted by Deakin University in 2021, 2023, 2024, and 2025, asked for graded responses ("strongly agree" to "strongly disagree") to the statement "we should not celebrate Australia Day on 26 January". Analysis of the data over these years found that the numbers remained relatively stable, reflecting a 40/60 split on the question of whether to change or retain, but suggested a hardening of views on the "retain" side, that is, they oppose a change of date more strongly. The polls found in November 2021 that 60% of all respondents strongly disagreed or disagreed with changing the date, whereas in June 2023 this figure had dropped to 56%. Asked whether they approved of celebrating Australia Day on 26 January, respondents under the age of 35 disapproved respectively by 53% and 57%, while those aged 35 to 54 disapproved respectively by 35% and 42%. The authors observe: "while younger Australians might be leading the push for change, there is a shift towards change in all age groups".

A January 2026 IPA poll found 76 per cent agreed with the statement "Australia Day should be celebrated on 26 January". A January 2026 Roy Morgan poll found that 72 per cent said that 26 January should be known as "Australia Day". A January 2026 Resolve poll found 68 per cent supported keeping Australia Day on 26 January (representing the third consecutive annual increase), only 16% were in support of changing the date, and another 16% were neutral. Majorities of every generation were supportive of the day. A national poll commissioned by Future Super on behalf of Clothing the Gaps on 21 January 2026 asked 1,508 Australians whether they would prefer an Australian Long Weekend: a public holiday on the second-last Monday of January, or Australia Day fixed to January 26. The results indicated that 54 per cent supported celebrating on the second-last Monday in January – the first option.
