= Teena McQueen =

Australian politician (died 2026)

Vice President of the Liberal Party of Australia
- In office 2017–2023

Personal details
- Died: 24 June 2026

Teena McQueen (died 24 June 2026) was an Australian politician.

== Life and career ==
McQueen was one of the four vice presidents of the federal Liberal Party of Australia serving from 2017 to 2023 after securing the position from incumbent Trish Worth. A month prior to her death, she resigned from the Liberals after 40 years and became a member of the One Nation party.

McQueen died after a short illness on 24 June 2026.
