= Heather Goodall =

Australian historian (1950–2026)

Professor Heather Goodall AM FRSN FASSA
- Born: 1950
- Died: 29 January 2026 (aged 75)
- Awards: New South Wales Premier's Australian History Prize (1997); John Barrett Award (1993); Magarey Medal for biography (2005); Fellow of the Academy of the Social Sciences in Australia (2007)

Academic background
- Education: University of Sydney
- Thesis: A History of Aboriginal Communities in New South Wales, 1909–1939 (1982)
- Doctoral advisor: Heather Radi

Academic work
- Institutions: University of Technology Sydney; Macquarie University
- Main interests: Indigenous peoples Environmental history

Heather Goodall (1950 – 29 January 2026) was an Australian academic and historian. She was Emeritus Professor at the University of Technology Sydney. Her research and writing focused on Indigenous and environmental history and intercolonial networks.

== Background ==
Goodall graduated from the University of Sydney in 1975 and was awarded the University Medal in History. She received a PhD from the same university in 1982 for her thesis "A History of Aboriginal Communities in New South Wales, 1909–1939".

Goodall died on 29 January 2026, at the age of 75.

== Awards and recognition ==
Goodall won the inaugural Australian History Prize at the New South Wales Premier's History Awards in 1997 for Invasion to Embassy and a Rona Tranby Award in 1998. She won the Magarey Medal for biography in 2005 for Isabel Flick, co-written by the subject, Isabel Flick.

She was elected a Fellow of the Academy of the Social Sciences in Australia in 2007. She was also a Fellow of the Royal Society of New South Wales.

Rivers and Resilience was shortlisted for the Community and Regional History Prize at the New South Wales Premier's History Awards in 2010.

Goodall was appointed a Member of the Order of Australia in the 2024 King's Birthday Honours for "significant service to tertiary education, particularly social science, and to the Indigenous community".

She was awarded the 2025 Annual History Citation by the History Council of NSW Inc., in recognition of her contributions to history through her efforts to inform and enrich national conversations about Indigenous histories and the myriad of inter-colonial relationships that have influenced the past and present.

== Selected works ==
- Invasion to Embassy: Land in Aboriginal politics in New South Wales, 1770–1972, Allen & Unwin with Black Books, 1996 ISBN 1864481498
- Isabel Flick: The Many Lives of an Extraordinary Aboriginal Woman, co-written by Isabel Flick, Allen & Unwin, 2004 ISBN 9781741141238
- Rivers and Resilience: Aboriginal people on Sydney's Georges River, co-written by Allison Cadzow, UNSW Press, 2009 ISBN 9781921410741
- Beyond Borders: Indians, Australians and the Indonesian Revolution, 1939 to 1950, Amsterdam University Press, 2018 ISBN 9789462981454
- Georges River Blues: Swamps, Mangroves and Resident Action, 1945–1980, ANU Press, 2022 ISBN 9781760464622
