= Gordon Green (footballer, born 1925) =

Australian rules footballer (1925–2026)

Personal information
- Full name: Gordon Stanley Green
- Born: 31 May 1925; Mordialloc, Victoria, Australia
- Died: 29 July 2026 (aged 101); Hope Island, Queensland, Australia
- Height: 178 cm (5 ft 10 in)
- Weight: 71 kg (157 lb)

Playing career
Years	Club	Games (Goals)
1942	North Melbourne	1 (0)

Gordon Stanley Green (31 May 1925 – 29 July 2026) was an Australian rules footballer who played with North Melbourne in the Victorian Football League (VFL).

Green was born in Mordialloc, Victoria on 31 May 1925, and died in Hope Island, Queensland on 29 July 2026, at the age of 101. On 1 August, North Melbourne players wore black armbands to honour his memory.
