= 2026 Ballina boating accident =

Boating accident in Ballina, Australia

- Date: 4 May 2026
- Location: Ballina, New South Wales, Australia; 28°52′36″S 153°35′29″E
- Type: Boating accident
- Deaths: 3
- Injuries: 1

On 4 May 2026 a recreational yacht struck the southern breakwall at the mouth of the Richmond River near Ballina, New South Wales. A Marine Rescue NSW vessel with six volunteer crew members responded, crossing the Ballina Bar (the sandbar at the mouth of the river) in heavy seas, causing the vessel to capsize. Three people died, including two volunteer rescuers and the man from the stricken yacht.

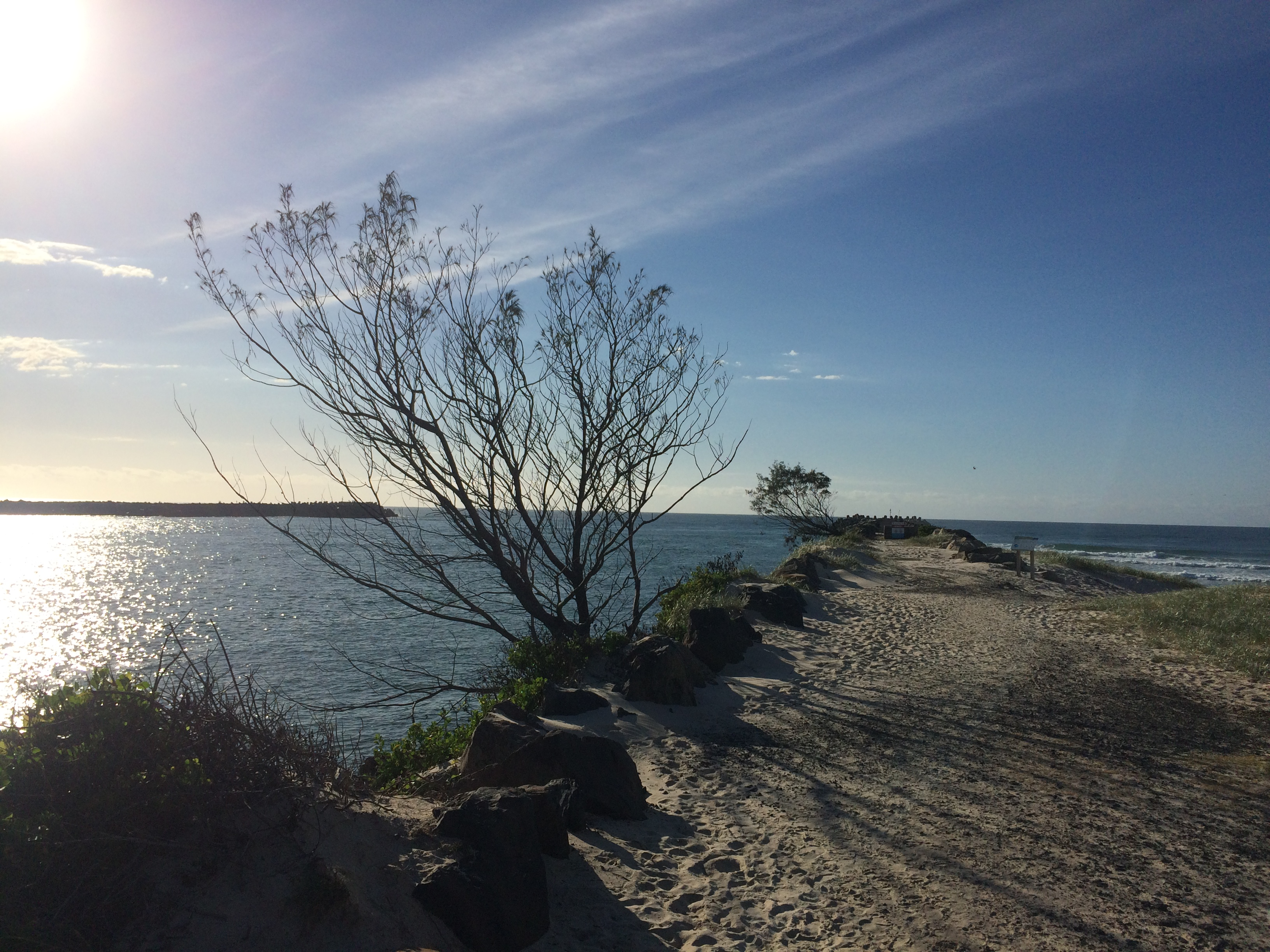
View from the southern breakwall upon which the yacht was stricken, pictured in 2019

== Bibliography ==
- "Two volunteers among three dead off NSW coast after rescue boat rolls while trying to help sinking yacht". Guardian Australia. Australian Associated Press.
- Lana, Lam. "Rescuers among three dead after yacht sinks off Australian coast". BBC.
- MacKenzie, Bruce; Corvo, Shannon. "Three dead including two rescue volunteers after Ballina boating accident on NSW coast". ABC News.
