= 2026 Invasion Day protest bombing attempt =

Attempted terrorist bombing in Western Australia

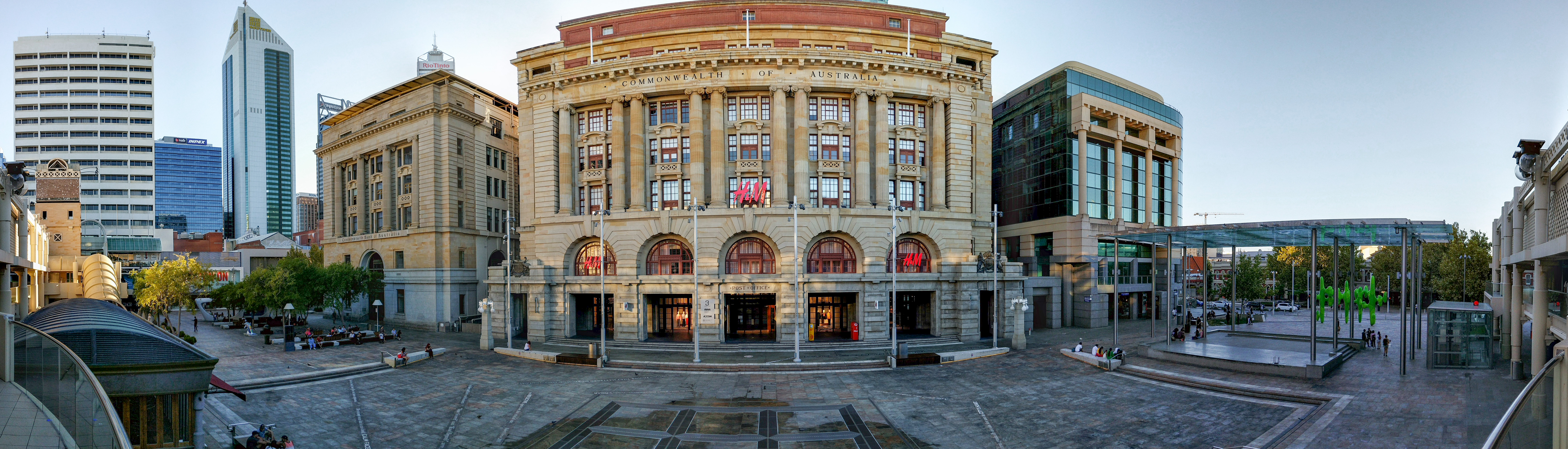
- Forrest Place in Perth.
- Location: Forrest Place, Perth, Australia
- Date: 26 January 2026
- Attack type: Attempted bombing
- Weapon: Homemade fragment bomb
- Deaths: 0
- Injuries: 0
- Motive: Racism and terrorism (alleged)
- Accused: Liam Alexander Hall

On 26 January 2026 – officially Australia Day, but also known by many Indigenous Australians as Invasion Day – a homemade fragment bomb was thrown into a crowd gathering for an Invasion Day rally in Forrest Place in Perth, Western Australia. The bomb failed to detonate.

Liam Alexander Hall, a 31-year-old man, was arrested shortly afterwards and charged with committing an unlawful act with intent to harm and making explosives under suspicious circumstances. On 5 February, the Australian Federal Police (AFP) charged Hall with one count of engaging in a terrorist attack in relation to the attempted bombing, which prosecutors will argue was motivated by racism and nationalism. The subsequent criminal charges of terrorism were the first in Western Australian history. It was also the first time in Australia that a terror charge has been laid as a result of an attack on Indigenous Australian people.

== Incident ==
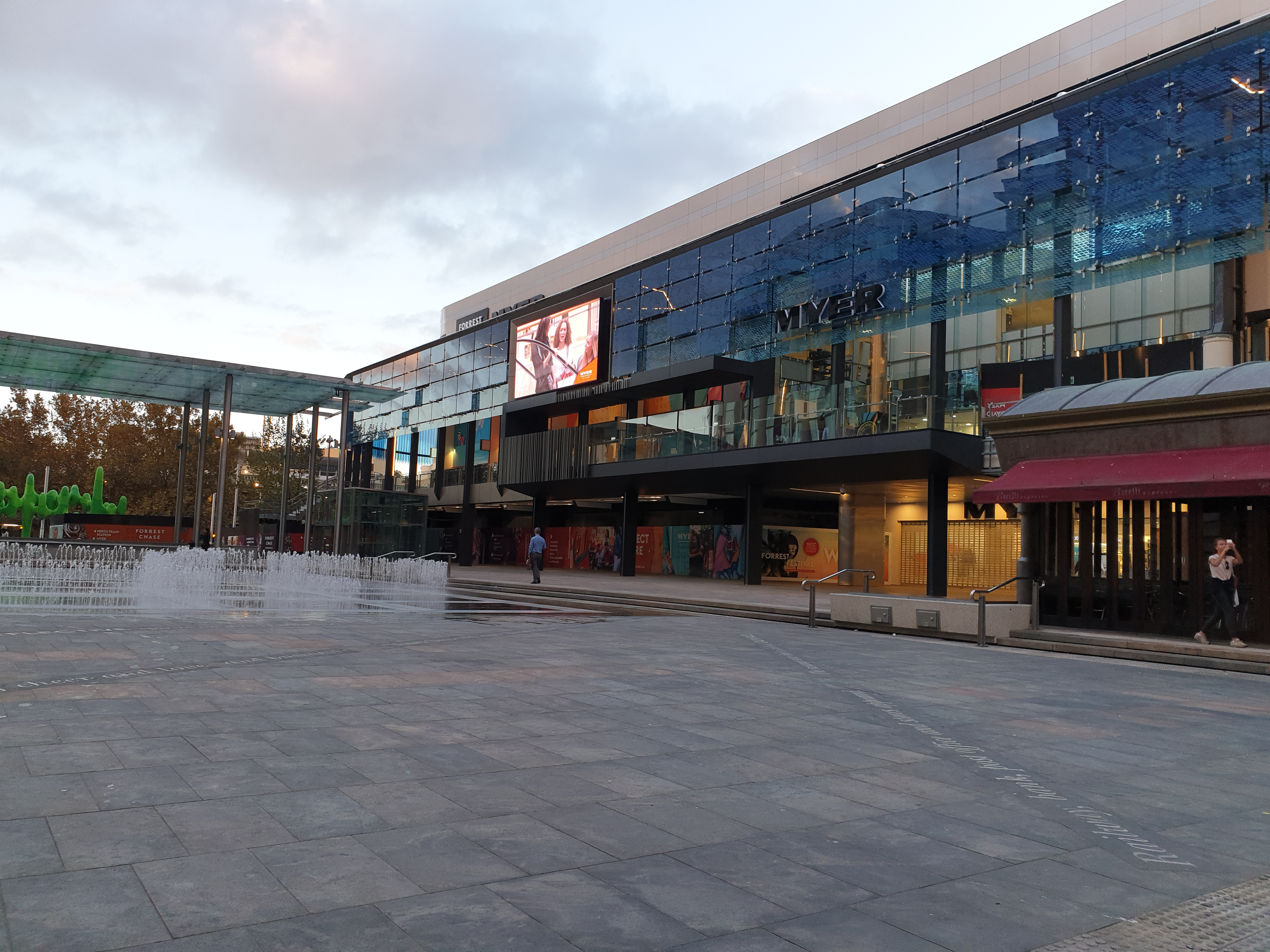
Forrest Chase shopping centre. The bomb was thrown from the first floor walkway overlooking Forrest Place

On 26 January 2026, an Invasion Day protest rally was held at Forrest Place, a pedestrianised square in the Perth central business district, attended by around 2,000–2,500 people. About half an hour after the rally began, a man alleged by police to be Liam Alexander Hall, threw a homemade fragment bomb from the first floor walkway at Forrest Chase shopping centre overlooking Forrest Place into the crowd. The bomb consisted of a glass container the size of a coffee cup filled with chemicals, ball bearings and screws, and concealed in an Elsa-themed sock. The improvised explosive device landed amongst the crowd in front of the main stage but failed to explode.

Writer Sisonke Msimang, who was attending the rally with a Noongar colleague, saw the device land and the man leaving the scene, and picked it up after it landed about 2 metres (6 ft 7 in) away and people started to move around it. She handed it to two police officers, who took the device but did not take her details. About half an hour after the bomb was handed in, police began to evacuate the area. However, attendees were confused due to issues with communication from police, leading to delays in the area being fully evacuated. Hall was seen trying to flee the area and was arrested at the scene after being identified by witnesses. There were no reported casualties.

Forrest Place was cordoned off for two hours after the incident. Despite the seriousness of the incident, police determined there was no longer an ongoing threat and Australia Day festivities held at nearby Langley Park continued as scheduled.

== Criminal proceedings ==
Liam Alexander Hall, the man who was alleged to have thrown the device, was arrested at the protest and police searched his Warwick home the same day. He appeared in court the following day, 27 January. He was charged with one charge each of committing an unlawful act with intent to harm and making explosives under suspicious circumstances. A court order had initially suppressed Hall's identity to the public for his and his family's safety.

On 4 February, the AFP charged Hall with one count of engaging in a terrorist attack. It had taken the Western Australia Police Force nine days to declare the event a terrorist attack. Western Australian Police Commissioner Col Blanch said that, before charges could be laid, police needed to interview the suspect, analyse material on his electronic devices, and speak to his family and friends, before they could satisfy the threshold that classed the act as terrorism. University of Western Australia Indigenous Studies researcher and psychologist Pat Dudgeon said that the event was "very frightening", but she understood why it had taken so long to declare it as terrorism, saying:

I understand that in order to get up a charge that has merit and will stand in court, you have to have appropriate evidence, but for many of us, from the outside looking in, it felt slow.

It was the first time in Australia that a terror charge had been laid as a result of an attack on Aboriginal and Torres Strait Islander persons. Blanch said prosecutors will allege the attack was "nationalist and racially motivated".

On 17 February, Hall's identity was revealed to the public after lawyers from both the Commonwealth and Western Australian police had argued that his identity should be revealed in the public interest. The case returned to court on 31 March, after Hall's lawyer secured a six-week adjournment to assess his mental health treatment in custody. Through his lawyer, Hall indicated that he may enter an insanity plea at his next hearing, which was scheduled for late May.

On 26 May, Hall appeared via video link from a psychiatric hospital, where the charges were read to him for the first time but he was not required to enter a plea. He was remanded in custody. The matter will next be heard in February 2027.

== Reactions ==
=== Politicians ===
Labor politician and Western Australian premier Roger Cook said the incident had the potential to be a mass casualty event. Prime Minister Anthony Albanese, also from the Labor Party, said "this was an incident that is quite shocking. He's been charged with two serious offences and I look forward to him being prosecuted to the full force of the law." Malarndirri McCarthy, the Minister for Indigenous Australians, said the incident had "narrowly avoided a catastrophic disaster". On a statement on social media, McCarthy also said that the targeting of First Nations people was sickening.

Independent Senator Lidia Thorpe condemned attacks on First Nations peoples, at a "time when far-right extremism is an escalating threat". She was critical of Albanese for not having a stronger response.

=== Civil society and media ===
There was criticism by Indigenous and other Australians of the disparity in concern between the danger to the Jewish and Indigenous communities, when comparing the response between this event and the 2025 Bondi Beach shooting six weeks earlier, (Note: The Bondi Beach shooting was a terrorist attack on Hanukkah celebrations in Sydney, in which two gun men killed 15 people and injured dozens of others.) including the length of time it took to declare the incident a terrorist attack. On 28 January the Australian Human Rights Commission and Social Justice Commissioner Katie Kiss called for the attack to be given the same priority as the Bondi Beach attack.

On 28 January, the Human Rights Law Centre called for the incident to be investigated as an act of terrorism or hate crime. Friends of the Earth Australia (FoE) published a statement on their website saying that they were "deeply concerned that since the attack, both the media and several political leaders have downplayed the gravity of what could easily have been a mass casualty event". FoE called on the federal government to "lead a comprehensive response... to tackle the rising racism and violence against First Peoples across the continent". Lorena Allam wrote in The Guardian of the rise of neo-Nazis in Australia and the "stark difference in attention and empathy at the unsuccessful bombing at Boorloo [Perth]".

The organisers of the Invasion Day rally published an open letter to Cook on 9 February 2026, calling on his government and the federal government to formally investigate the incident as a hate crime, and to "expand the terms of reference for the Royal Commission into anti-semitism to cover all forms of racism and far right extremism".
