= Isabel Flick =

Australian Aboriginal rights activist (1928–2000)

- Born: Isabel Ann Flick; 1928; Goondiwindi, Queensland
- Died: 16 February 2000 (aged 71–72); Sydney, New South Wales
- Resting place: Collarenebri Aboriginal Cemetery
- Occupation: Australian Aboriginal rights activist
- Partner(s): 1. Aud; 2. Ted Thorne
- Children: 6 (Ben, Larry, Brenda, Tony, Amy, Aubrey) (with Aud)

Isabel Ann Flick OAM (1928 – 16 February 2000) was an Australian Aboriginal rights activist, social worker and teacher. She was recognised as a leader not only of the Aboriginal community of Australia, but as a spokesperson for environmental issues in her hometown of Collarenebri, in northwestern New South Wales.

== Family, early years and education ==
Isabel Flick's father was Mick Flick, who was born in the 1890s and grew up in the Aboriginal community in Miambla. His mother died very young, so he was brought up by his grandmother. Mick Flick joined the Australian Army in 1914 after running away from his job. As he was too young to enlist, he lied about his age, and as Aboriginal people did not have birth certificates, he was accepted into the army. He was sent to the Western Front only six weeks after signing up. He fought in the Somme Valley but was injured twice and so sent to a hospital in England. On his return home from the war, he met and married Celia Clevens. Clevens grew up in the Aboriginal community of Goondiwindi in Queensland. They moved to Collarenebri, where they lived for a few years. Mick worked on a farm and Celia lived at home and worked at their families' station. The police constantly monitored their whereabouts so they needed to move from time to time to avoid being separated from each other. This was a common strategy amongst Aboriginal communities at the time as the government monitored their activities.

Isabel Flick was born in 1928 in Goondiwindi, Queensland. She then moved and grew up in an Aboriginal riverbank camp in Collarenebri, on the bank of the Barwon River. This town was seen as a border between Aboriginal and non-Aboriginal people, as Aboriginal people would experience hostility from the non-Aboriginal population when going into the main street. The Flick family moved around a lot, just as Mick and Celia Flick had, as a way of "keeping away from the system" imposed by the government in Australia. Both of Flick's parents feared their children being taken away from them. Isabel Flick was always known for making trouble as a child, although she was a shy girl. She was known for being an encouraging and moving person when she spoke. At the age of 10 she was barred from formal education and even threatened with removal by the Aboriginal Protection Board. This was done in accordance with the Dog Act.

=== Toomelah Mission ===
In 1938, Flick along with her cousins, Florrie and Bob, were moved away from their parents to live with their grandmother at the Toomelah Aboriginal Mission in inland New South Wales. Tin camps were built for them to live in here. This was a very controlled time in all of their lives. Permission was needed for everything, and arrangements were always made, such as attending Sunday school and church services. If something wasn't up to adequate standards at the house they lived in, or they didn't act in the desired way then the Matron had the right to correct it. Although this was a very organised and often restricted time in Flick's life, it was where she learnt to read and write, and where she received an education although it was only up to a present-day Year 3's education. It was here where the government wanted the aboriginal children to assimilate into ‘white society’. Flick's parents would often come to visit her but this was not done very often, and usually not together. Her father was only allowed to stay for one hour and she was only allowed one visitor at a time. Flick began to realise how Aboriginal people had very limited rights and it was here she witnessed her first activist meeting. She returned home from the Toomelah Mission to Collarenebri to her mother and her father in 1942 wanting to make positive changes to her community.

=== Teenage years ===
As a teenager, Flick began to become fed up with the rudeness that always occurred towards Aboriginal people in social situations. She remembers an instance where people attending a Slim Dusty concert who were not Aboriginal people, held their noses as she and two of her Aboriginal friends walked past. She was always careful about what she said, as she didn't want to "rock the boat" but she knew that those kinds of things should not occur. There were many other occurrences such as this where she was discriminated against, and not allowed to be in certain areas or experience the same things the white population could.

== Adult life ==
By 1950, Flick's focus had changed from her teenage years to her role as an adult. In 1949, she gave birth to a boy Ben, with partner Aud. She also had her work to worry about. She worked on pastoral stations with her family, with shearing contracts her father had organised for her. For the first few years of Ben's life he stayed with his grandfather, Flick's father. At seven, he was sent to school. Flick later had five more children with Aud.

It was still a very difficult time for Flick during these years, as the police were always aware of Aboriginal people and monitored there whereabouts and activities. If one were found to be drunk they would instantly be taken away. They could be checked at any time even if they were getting changed or in the bathtub. In addition, there were diseases, leading to the government putting their entire village in quarantine.

=== Aboriginal activism ===
Due to her experience with racism in rural Australia and the various camps she attended, she spent her life wanting more for Aboriginal people. Her first experience of speaking out publicly against such racism was at a cinema in 1961 in Collarenebri. The 1960s were a difficult time for her and the Aboriginal community due to a lack of employment opportunities causing economic distress, but it was during this decade that she felt growing confidence to speak out about the issues she was experiencing and the racism of her town. She challenged the seating arrangements, arguing that "our money is as good as anyone else's and we want to sit where we want to sit". Aboriginal people were typically roped off at an area at the front of the screen. She experienced segregation and discrimination in not only these cinemas, but in education, health, employment and even before the law. Her radical acts are said to have inspired the 1965 Freedom Ride in rural Australia.

She was at first embarrassed to outwardly discuss racism, but her confidence grew over time. She soon was known on the political stage. Although her efforts were directed at the non-Aboriginal community at their treatment of Aboriginal people, she was not afraid to speak openly about justice and unequal treatment to her own community and people as well.

Her son Ben also experienced racism at school, which made her angry. She "lost it" when he got hit across the hand with a ruler by a white teacher during a school lesson. This then led the Parent and Citizens Association at the school to draw on Flick's knowledge and skill. They lobbied with Flick to the Department of Education for better education standards and facilities to learn in. Flick was not allowed to enter this school in 1938, but was now a spokesperson on their behalf.

The Australian political scene was changing for Aboriginal people in the 1960s, with the federal electoral laws changing in 1961 to allow Aboriginal people to vote in national elections. In 1965, the Parliamentary Committee came to Collarenebri, after the Freedom Ride passed through. It was then that Flick met politicians and discussed Aboriginal living conditions and the way they were treated by the police. Henry Denyer was the man who encouraged Isabel to speak to these politicians and become an active member in the Collarenebri Muni community. Flick then later began to discuss the importance of protecting women and children from family violence as this was deeply rooted in her community and family experiences in Collarenebri.

=== 1972: move to Sydney ===
Isabel Flick left Collarenebri in 1972 and moved to Sydney. She was concerned of her children's education in Collarenebri, believing that the schools in the area were not sufficient for educating older children. Ben was now independent and had a successful regional football career, first with Narrabri and then with Bathurst Football Clubs, and Larry was working but wanted to stay home in Collarenebri. Flick hoped moving to the city would benefit her other children: Tony, Brenda, Amy and Aub. When they first moved they struggled to find accommodation camping with family and friends in Bridge Road, Glebe. Soon though the family moved to 102 Johnston Street, Annandale, New South Wales.

Flick worked at the Royal Prince Alfred Hospital during this time. She felt a sense of "release" from her move, as it was a new beginning for her. The family didn't experience hostility, as much in the city and this was really refreshing for her. During her time in Sydney, she became more involved in Aboriginal activist groups, in the Foundation for Aboriginal Affairs, in South Sydney Community Aid and the Aboriginal Tent Embassy.

During 1977, Flick's health deteriorated as she struggled to make a substantial income for her family, who still lived in their Annandale home. She started to realise that smoking cigarettes was aggravating her hypertension and chest infections but she still found it was too difficult to give up smoking, due to the environment she was in and her addiction. She resigned from the Royal Prince Alfred Hospital and became a health worker in the Aboriginal Health Unit in the NSW Department of Health. During this time her work increased with Aboriginal land rights and the Aboriginal Tent Embassy.

== Later life and death ==
She returned to her hometown of Collarenebri in 1978, where her fellow Aboriginal community recognised her political experience and courage, and even non-Aboriginal people of her town acknowledged her, as well. Her relationship with Aud had ended before she returned. Her popularity was proved when was chosen by both Aboriginal and non-Aboriginal people to be the spokesperson of their town. From her time in Sydney, she had a vast amount of resources and connections, which allowed her to implement special initiatives in her town. She was able to negotiate well and deal with various egos, which made her easy to work with.

On her return home, she also entered into a relationship with childhood friend, Ted Thorne. The two had always been friends and they now were happy together. Segregation still was present in Collarenebri, but it was definitely a different place to when Flick first lived there. Flick lobbied for fairness and equality in this region and also for a fairer system with housing, health and education. Aboriginal employment was a major win for Flick, as it meant Aboriginal people were given the opportunity to be in the workforce with the white population.

Throughout the 1980s, she fought a difficult battle, along with her sister Rose Flick, to protect the carved trees at the Bora Ground site in Collymongle, northern New South Wales, which was a sacred part of their Aboriginal community.

Flick had surgery in December 1995. In 1996, Flick travelled to Sydney to teach Aboriginal history at Tranby Aboriginal College in Glebe. She was on the board of directors at this college, where she taught Aboriginal history. At this time she also moved away from Collarenebri to Gunnedah with Thorne, still being involved with her activist work especially with the land council.

In her final years, Flick developed lung cancer due to many years of smoking. She had chemotherapy and her family cared for her until she died on 16 February 2000. (Note: Flick's autobiography, published posthumously in 2004, gives her year of death both as 2000 [p. xiv, xviii] and, erroneously, as 2002 [p. 254].) Her family received condolences from the premier of New South Wales and the deputy prime minister of Australia.

== Recognition ==
Flick has been described as a powerful and inspirational speaker, and as having "many lives" because of the breadth of her experiences.

For her service to the community, Isabel Ann Flick was awarded the Order of Australia Medal in 1986.

She was honoured by the Tranby Aboriginal Cooperative College, where she had taught, and by her community in 1993, and then again at her death.
