= 1991 in British television =

This is a list of British television related events from 1991.

== Events ==
=== January ===
- 1 January
  - The Independent Television Commission (ITC) replaces the Independent Broadcasting Authority (IBA). On the same day, the Broadcasting Act 1990 takes effect, thus beginning the deregulation of British television and radio.
  - New Year's Day highlights on BBC1 include the network television premieres of the science fiction drama SpaceCamp and the 1987 vampire film The Lost Boys.
- 3 January
  - The sitcom The Brittas Empire makes its debut on BBC1, starring Chris Barrie.
  - The puppet Gordon the Gopher returns to television with a thirteen-episode series on BBC1.
- 7 January – BBC1 launches the local news programme BBC East Midlands Today for the East Midlands region. News coverage for the area had previously been provided by a seven-minute opt out from the Birmingham-based Midlands Today.
- 8 January
  - The opening episode of the second season of Twin Peaks makes its British debut on BBC2.
  - The children's arts and crafts series Bitsa makes its debut on BBC1.
- 14 January – The American sitcom The Fresh Prince of Bel-Air, starring Will Smith, makes its debut on BBC2 as part of the DEF II programming strand.
- 17 January–2 March – Most regular programming is suspended to bring live coverage of the Gulf War after Allied Forces launch Operation Desert Storm against Iraq. Over the coming weeks, there is extended coverage of events in the Persian Gulf. On BBC1, in addition to extended and additional news bulletins, a special daytime news analysis programme War in the Gulf, presented by David Dimbleby, is broadcast, although as the war progresses the length of each programme and frequency of broadcast is scaled back. ITV also broadcasts additional news and discussion programmes about the war, including all-night coverage during the early stages of the conflict and Channel 4 broadcasts a two-hour special programme at midnight as well as Saturday editions of The Channel 4 Daily. Some coverage, particularly in the earlier part of the war, comes from CNN. Sky News presents round-the-clock coverage and UK viewers are also able to watch rolling coverage on CNN.
- 18 January – BBC2 airs a special edition of Arena in which playwright Arthur Miller meets ANC leader Nelson Mandela. In the show, Mandela talks for the first time about his life and experiences from a personal standpoint.
- 19 January
  - The 17 January edition of Top of the Pops is broadcast, having been postponed from that date due to extended news coverage of the Gulf War.
  - Debut of the comedy talk show The Full Wax on BBC1, starring Ruby Wax.
- 26 January – Oliver Reed appears on an edition of the late-night Channel 4 discussion programme After Dark discussing militarism, masculine stereotypes and violence to women. Reed drinks alcohol during the broadcast, leading him to become drunk, aggressive and incoherent. He refers to another member of the panel who has a moustache as a 'tache' and uses offensive language. After one hour, Reed returns from the toilet and getting more to drink, rolls on top of the noted feminist author Kate Millett. The show is briefly taken off the air following a hoax call to the station claiming that Channel 4 boss Michael Grade is furious.

=== February ===
- 12 February – A year after the release of Nelson Mandela from prison, BBC2 airs an edition of its Assignment documentary strand in which journalist Donald Woods returns to South Africa to give his personal assessment of that country's future.
- 15 February – At the close of this day's programmes, the COW ident is seen for the final time on BBC1 after six years and the BBC2 'TWO' ident is also seen for the final time after five years.
- 16 February
  - Both BBC1 and BBC2 receive new idents, both generated from laserdisc and featuring the BBC corporate logo introduced in 1986. BBC1 features a numeral '1' encased in a globe and BBC2 features eleven idents based around a numeral '2'. Also on this day, new idents for Open University programmes come into use.
  - Matthew Kelly succeeds Bruce Forsyth as presenter of ITV's You Bet!
- 25 February – Debut of the children's series Radio Roo on BBC1, starring Wayne Jackman.
- 26 February – Iraqi leader Saddam Hussein announces the withdrawal of Iraqi troops from Kuwait. As the war comes to its conclusion, television programming begins to return to normal.

=== March ===
- 1 March – The monopoly on listings magazines ends with the deregulation of TV listings. Before today, Radio Times published only BBC listings and TVTimes ITV only (and from 1982, Channel 4, including S4C in a pull-out supplement Sbec). However, from this day, they can carry listings for all channels. Newspapers are also allowed to publish 7-day listings for the first time, having previously been able to publish only the present day's (and two days on Saturdays). A raft of listings magazines and supplements starts up in the wake of the changes.
- 3 March – Following the conclusion of the Gulf War, the ITN Early Morning News is halved in length and now goes on the air at 5:30am. From this point, the ITN World News is no longer broadcast as part of the bulletin.
- 9 March – While appearing as a guest on the ITV chat show Aspel & Company, singer Rod Stewart takes off his shoes and tosses them into the audience.
- 15 March – BBC1 airs Comic Relief 1991.
- 18 March – ITV broadcasts World in Action Special: The Birmingham Six – Their Own Story, a documentary that airs four days after the release of the wrongly convicted 'Birmingham Six'. It is later nominated for a BAFTA award.
- 30 March – Frederick Wiseman's six and a half-hour documentary Near Death, on life in a Boston intensive care unit, is broadcast in full by Channel 4.

=== April ===
- 1 April – Sue Lawley interviews Prime Minister John Major for ITV.
- 7 April
  - ITV airs the first Prime Suspect series, starring Helen Mirren as DCI Jane Tennison.
  - Comedy drama The Darling Buds of May makes its debut on ITV, starring David Jason, Pam Ferris and Catherine Zeta Jones.
  - The final episode of the sitcom Brush Strokes is broadcast on BBC1.
- 8 April
  - The Power Station, one of the channels to have survived the BSB merger with Sky, closes down at 4am after it was decided that the American MTV would be used as the music channel on BSkyB's Astra satellite service.
  - the 5th series of ITV Central's The Cook Report began with Roger Cook investigating the Hot Dog Wars.
  - Channel 4's three-week Banned season features a series of films and programmes which have previously been banned from British television or cinema. The season includes the network television premieres of Scum, Monty Python's Life of Brian and Sebastiane. There is also a second broadcast of the controversial 1988 Thames documentary Death on the Rock which investigated the shooting of three members of the IRA by the SAS in Gibraltar. The season proves to be controversial and Channel 4 is investigated by the Obscene Publications Squad and referred to the Director of Public Prosecutions.
- 9 April
  - Derek Nimmo makes a cameo appearance in Australian soap Neighbours as an eccentric English aristocrat, the episode having debuted in Australia on 26 February 1990.
  - Central Television takes back over production of the Children's ITV strand, with Tommy Boyd becoming the new in-vision presenter.
- 12 April – Debut of the children's game show Finders Keepers on Children's ITV, presented by Neil Buchanan.
- 15 April — BSB's films channel The Movie Channel launches on the Astra 1B satellite.
- 16 April – The network television premiere of Monty Python's Life of Brian as part of Channel 4's Banned season.
- 20 April – The Sports Channel on BSB is rebranded as Sky Sports.
- 29 April – On an edition of Terry Wogan's evening chat show Wogan and amid howls of laughter from the studio audience, footballer-turned-public speaker David Icke claims that he is "the son of God" and that Britain will be devastated by tidal waves and earthquakes. He later says that he had been misinterpreted and that he had used the term "the son of God" to mean an "aspect" of the Infinite consciousness. The interview proves devastating for him. The BBC is later criticised for allowing the interview to go ahead, with Des Christy in The Guardian calling it a "media crucifixion."
- 30 April – Debut of the long-running snooker-based game show Big Break on BBC1, presented by Jim Davidson.

=== May ===
- 3 May – The Girl from Tomorrow, a 12-part Australian children's series about a girl from the future who finds herself trapped in 1990 makes its UK debut on BBC1.
- 4 May – Sweden's Carola wins the 1991 Eurovision Song Contest (staged in Rome and broadcast by the BBC in the UK) with "Fångad av en stormvind". The British entry, "A Message to Your Heart" sung by Samantha Janus, finishes in 10th place.
- 5 May – BBC1 airs the final season of the US drama series Dallas, this time being shown on Sunday afternoons just two days after the final episode has been aired in the US.
- 6 May
  - Eurosport briefly closes after the competing Screensport channel had filed a complaint to the European Commission over its corporate structure.
  - The Movie Channel begins broadcasting 24 hours a day. Previously the channel has been on air from early afternoon until the early hours of the next morning.
  - The network television premiere of the 1987 gangster thriller The Untouchables on BBC1, starring Kevin Costner, Sean Connery and Robert De Niro.
- 8 May – The first terrestrial television showing of Matthew Robbins' 1981 dark fantasy adventure Dragonslayer on ITV, starring Peter MacNichol, Caitlin Clarke, Ralph Richardson and John Hallam.
- 13 May – ITV airs an edition of World in Action making allegations of malpractice in the Irish beef processing industry. The programme leads to the establishment of the Beef Tribunal which is to become Ireland's longest public inquiry at this time.
- 20 May – The final episode of ThunderCats is broadcast on BBC1.
- 22 May – Eurosport resumes broadcasting after TF1 Group steps in to replace BSkyB as their joint owners.
- 27 May – The network television premiere of the 1987 parody film Dragnet on BBC1, starring Dan Aykroyd and Tom Hanks.
- May – Midweek Sports Special ends after 13 years when all the English regions opt out for their own midweek sports shows. The programme continues in London as Thames Sports Special.

=== June ===
- 10 June
  - Postman Pat begins airing on ABC in Australia along with Thomas the Tank Engine & Friends' sister show Tugs.
  - The drama series Soldier Soldier makes its debut on ITV, starring Robson Green and Jerome Flynn.
- 13 June – An edition of BBC2's The Late Show is the final programme to be broadcast from the BBC's Lime Grove Studios.
- 16 June – BBC1 airs Cry Freedom, Richard Attenborough's acclaimed film about South African journalist Donald Woods. It is shown in two parts with the second aired on 23 June.
- 18 June – BBC2 airs the concluding episode of David Lynch's drama Twin Peaks.
- 20 June – The murder of Harry Collinson, the planning officer for Derwentside District Council, takes place at Butsfield, County Durham while television news crews are filming for a news item about a planning dispute. At the time of the murder, the Derwentside District Council is involved in the dispute with Albert Dryden over the erection of a building by Dryden on green belt land without planning permission and as television crews are filming, Dryden aims a handgun, a .455 Webley Mk VI revolver at Collinson and shoots him dead. As the journalists and council staff flee, Dryden opens fire again, wounding television reporter Tony Belmont and Police Constable Stephen Campbell. Dryden is convicted of Collinson's murder following a trial in April the following year. Additionally, he is also convicted of the attempted murder of council solicitor Michael Dunstan and the wounding of Campbell and Belmont. He is sentenced to life imprisonment.
- 30 June – Channel 4 airs the first episode of Family Pride, the first British soap to feature a predominantly Asian cast. The series is produced by Central and is also shown on ITV in the Midlands region.

=== July ===
- 1 July – The long-lived "Wings" set makes its debut on the Channel 4 game show Countdown, alongside the use of tie-break conundrums.
- 13 July – Bernard Wenton, performing as Nat King Cole, wins the second series of Stars in Their Eyes on ITV.
- 14 July – Sue Lawrence wins the 1991 series of MasterChef on BBC1.
- 14–25 July – Sky Sports broadcasts full live coverage of the 1991 World Student Games which are held in the UK (Sheffield). This is the only time that Sky has broadcast a multi-sport event and it is the only time the event has been broadcast live.
- 22 July – BBC1 airs an extended edition of Wogan in which Terry Wogan meets and talks to the pop star Madonna.
- 24 July – The final programme to be recorded at the BBC Television Theatre in Shepherd's Bush is broadcast, an edition of Wogan recorded on 18 July.
- 29 July–2 August – Tim Brooke-Taylor and Lisa Aziz present QD – The Master Game, a game that airs over five nights on Channel 4 and comprises mental and physical challenges.
- 30 July – Australian children's series Johnson and Friends makes its UK debut on BBC2.
- 31 July
  - Pavarotti in the Park, a concert celebrating thirty years of Luciano Pavarotti's operatic career, is held in London's Hyde Park. The concert is attended by an audience of 125,000 who gather despite the wet weather, and is broadcast by Sky.
  - The BBC's Lime Grove Studios close.

=== August ===
- 3 August – The network television premiere of the comedy thriller Spies, Lies & Naked Thighs on BBC1, starring Ed Begley Jr.
- 9 August – Channel 4 debuts the HBO comedy series Dream On, one of the first US shows to feature uncensored profanity and nudity.
- 14 August – BBC1 airs Mozart in London, the first of a three-part series marking the bicentenary of his death and in which his earliest pieces are performed by children of about the same age as he was when he wrote them. It is the first time this has been done on British television.
- 20 August – The BBC revives the snooker series Pot Black after a five year absence. It begins with Junior Pot Black which last appeared in 1983 and being shown on BBC2 three mornings a week for this week and the next. In this series, 15 year old Ronnie O'Sullivan competed and later won the series. The main show returns soon afterwards on 2 September on BBC1 in the afternoon schedule.
- 23 August–1 September – Eurosport airs the World Athletics Championships for the first time. The event is also shown on the BBC.
- 26 August – BBC2 airs a day of programmes paying tribute to the Lime Grove Studios which closed the previous month and includes a remake of 1950s soap opera The Grove Family, featuring stars from the present day, and a repeat of An Unearthly Child, the first-ever episode of Doctor Who from 1963.
- 29 August – Top of the Pops is simulcast on BBC Radio 1 for the last time, the episode presented by Jakki Brambles.

That same day, Sir Alistair Burnet presented his final News at Ten before his retirement.

- 31 August – BBC television starts officially broadcasting in stereo using the NICAM system, although some transmitters had been broadcasting BBC programmes in stereo since 1986, but these were classified as tests.

=== September ===
- 3 September – The sitcom 2point4 Children makes its debut on BBC1, starring Belinda Lang and Gary Olsen.
- 5 September – The actor Arthur Pentelow who died on 6 August, makes his final on-screen appearance as Henry Wilks in Emmerdale. The character dies off-screen on 3 October.
  - After two years off air, ITV comedy-drama Minder returns with a new theme tune and new opening titles with Gary Webster joining the cast as Ray Daley, taking over from Dennis Waterman.
- 9 September – New idents launch on Children's BBC, featuring the BBC corporate logo.
- 11 September – ITV airs Thatcher: The Final Days, a dramatisation of the final days of Margaret Thatcher's premiership. The film stars Sylvia Syms as the former Prime Minister.
- 13 September – The documentary The Leader, His Driver and the Driver's Wife airs on Channel 4. It is set during the final days of the apartheid regime in South Africa, particularly centering on Eugène Terre'Blanche, founder and leader of the far-right, white supremacist political organisation AWB. A year later, Channel 4 faces its first libel case by Jani Allan, a South African journalist who objects to her representation in the documentary.
- 14 September – Channel 4 airs "A Night in Japan", a night of programmes dedicated to all things Japanese, from 8pm to 6am.
- 17 September – The sitcom Bottom makes its debut on BBC2, starring Rik Mayall and Adrian Edmondson.
- 20 September – BBC2 begins a rerun of Gerry Anderson's 1960s ITV science fiction marionette series Thunderbirds. The series proves to be popular, leading to a shortage of Tracy Island toys in stores during the run up to Christmas, something that prompts Blue Peter to show viewers and their parents how to make their own Tracy Island model. An instruction sheet produced by the programme receives more than 100,000 requests.
- 21 September – More than eight years after launching a weekday breakfast television service, the BBC launches a five-minute long weekend breakfast news bulletin.
- 22 September
  - Sponsorship of ITV programmes is allowed.
  - The network television premiere of Adrian Lyne's 1987 thriller Fatal Attraction on ITV, starring Michael Douglas, Glenn Close and Anne Archer.
- 26 September
  - The children's series Brum makes its debut on BBC1.
  - The children's game show Get Your Own Back makes its debut on BBC1, presented by Dave Benson Phillips.
- 28 September – The network television premiere of the 1988 film Buster on ITV, starring Phil Collins as Great Train robber Buster Edwards.

=== October ===
- 1 October – The Comedy Channel launches.
- 2 October – The 1000th episode of the soap Brookside is broadcast on Channel 4.
- 3 October–2 November – ITV airs coverage of the 1991 Rugby World Cup. The competition is hosted by England, Scotland, Wales, Ireland and France.
- 4 October – The US animated series The Legend of Prince Valiant makes its UK debut on BBC1.
- 5 October – ITV screens the terrestrial premiere of the 1987 action film Lethal Weapon, starring Mel Gibson and Danny Glover.
- 6 October – BBC1 airs Conundrum, the final episode of the original run of Dallas. The feature-length episode imagines a world in which the soap's central character, J. R. Ewing, had not existed.
- 11 October – BBC2 shows the late-night Richard O'Brien hosted series Mystery Train featuring cult and B-Movie themed television programmes and films.
- 14 October
  - BBC World Service TV launches its Asian service.
  - After a five-year absence, Pebble Mill returns to BBC1.
- 16 October – The ITV franchise auction results are announced and take effect starting midnight on 1 January 1993. It will see many notable names going off air after losing their franchises, including Thames, TVS, TSW, TV-am and ORACLE Teletext. Central is, however, unopposed in bidding to retain its franchise
- 19 October – The final edition of Channel Television's TV listings magazine, CTV Times is published. It had remained on sale long after the other ITV regions had replaced their listings magazine with the TVTimes in the South of England edition along with TVS as it had been feared that Channel Television might cease trading without the revenue from its own magazine.
- 31 October – Channel 4 shows a number of Halloween themed programmes starting with the documentary Fear in the Dark narrated by Christopher Lee as well as the UK terrestrial premiere of the 1983 Tony Scott film The Hunger, starring David Bowie, Susan Sarandon and Catherine Deneuve.
- October
  - Scottish Television rebrands its overnight service as Scottish Night Time and removes its overnight in-vision continuity.
  - Cigar and pipe tobacco adverts are banned from British television.

=== November ===
- 1 November – ITV broadcasts the 1,000th edition of the ITV Central gameshow Blockbusters.
- 14 November
  - Debut of Dark Season, a six-part BBC1 science fiction series for children which sees actress Kate Winslet make her first on-screen appearance.
  - Debut of the dark comedy series Murder Most Horrid on BBC2, starring Dawn French.
- 15 November – BBC World Service Television begins broadcasting via satellite to Pearl River Delta, a subsidiary of STAR TV and owner of News Corporation, a conglomerate of Rupert Murdoch, a member of Hutchison Whampoa.
- 16 November – The network television premiere of Christopher Cain's 1988 Brat Pack western film Young Guns on ITV, starring Emilio Estevez, Kiefer Sutherland, Lou Diamond Phillips, Charlie Sheen and Terence Stamp.
- 17 November – Debut of Biteback on BBC1, a monthly programme that gives viewers a right-to-reply on issues raised by BBC content, presented by Julian Pettifer.
- 23 November – Debut of the Saturday night series Noel's House Party on BBC1, presented by Noel Edmonds.

=== December ===
- 3 December – Channel 4 airs the controversial documentary The Holy Family Album as part of its Without Walls series.
- 4 December – ITV shows the network television premiere of the 1988 comedy film Big, starring Tom Hanks.
- 15–16 December – ITV airs Heroes II: The Return, a British-Australian miniseries about Operation Rimau during World War II.
- 16 December – ITV's Central airs the final episode of Prisoner: Cell Block H, making it the first ITV region to complete the series.
- 20 December – ITV airs Treasure Hunt, the final new episode of the long-running children's series Rainbow, produced by Thames Television. The show continues to air until 31 December, but with repeats of previous episodes.
- 21 December
  - The network television premiere of the romantic thriller The House on Carroll Street on BBC1, starring Kelly McGillis, Jeff Daniels, Mandy Patinkin and Jessica Tandy.
  - BBC2 airs A Perfect Christmas, featuring the best of Christmas programming from the BBC archives. Shows include festive episodes of The Flower Pot Men, Dr. Finlay's Casebook and the 1986 Christmas Day episodes of EastEnders which were watched by over 30 million viewers.
  - Debut of the entertainment show Barrymore on ITV, presented by Michael Barrymore.
- 23 December – The network television premiere of the 1988 Oscar winning film Rain Man on BBC1, starring Dustin Hoffman and Tom Cruise.
- 24 December
  - Christmas Eve highlights on BBC1 include the terrestrial premiere of the 1988 Christmas comedy film Scrooged, starring Bill Murray and the first part of the Only Fools and Horses episode Miami Twice. BBC1 also shows the network television premiere of the 1987 thriller No Way Out, starring Kevin Costner, Gene Hackman and Sean Young.
  - Debut of the animated film Father Christmas on Channel 4, featuring the voice of Mel Smith.
- 25 December
  - Christmas Day highlights on BBC1 includes the second edition of the Only Fools and Horses episode Miami Twice.
  - The network television premieres of Tim Burton's blockbuster 1989 film Batman, starring Michael Keaton and Jack Nicholson, as well as John Landis' 1988 comedy film Coming to America, starring Eddie Murphy both on BBC1.
  - ITV network film premieres include the 1940 animated Walt Disney film Pinocchio and the 1988 action adventure sequel Crocodile Dundee II, starring Paul Hogan.
  - In an unusual move for a pre-recorded series, the Royal Christmas Message is integrated into the first of the day's episodes of Coronation Street on ITV. Character Alf Roberts sat down in front of his television, 'watched' the speech in its entirety and the episode resumed. Details of plans to include the Queen's Speech in the episode were leaked a few weeks prior to Christmas, raising concerns that the BBC may attempt to outdo their ITV rivals with their own Christmas Day surprise, but Granada Television decided to go ahead with the idea anyway.
  - Postman Pat returns to BBC1 with two 10th anniversary special episodes, one on Christmas morning and the other in the New Year.
- 26 December – Boxing Day highlights on BBC1 include All for Love, a feature-length episode of Bergerac which serves as the series finale and the network television premiere of the 1988 hit comedy film A Fish Called Wanda, starring John Cleese and Jamie Lee Curtis.
- 28 December – BBC2 shows Hail! Hail! Rock 'n' Roll, Taylor Hackford's acclaimed documentary celebrating Chuck Berry's 60th birthday with footage of two concerts from 1986.
- 29 December
  - The network television premiere of White Mischief on BBC2, starring Greta Scacchi and Charles Dance.
  - Debut of the bloopers series Auntie's Bloomers on BBC1, presented by Terry Wogan.
- 31 December
  - New Year's Eve highlights on BBC1 include the network television premiere of Back to School, starring Rodney Dangerfield and the year's end review programme Clive James on 1991.
  - The network television premiere of the 1979 Australian thriller Mad Max on BBC2, starring Mel Gibson.

== Debuts ==
=== BBC1 ===
- 2 January – Potsworth & Co. (1990)
- 3 January
  - The Brittas Empire (1991–1994, 1996–1997)
  - Dooby's Duck Truck (1991)
  - Gordon the Gopher (1991)
  - Billy Webb's Amazing Story (1991)
- 7 January – BBC East Midlands Today (1991–present)
- 8 January
  - Spender (1991–1993)
  - Bitsa (1991–1996)
- 9 January – Five Children and It (1991)
- 19 January – The Full Wax (1991–1993)
- 25 January – Boys from the Bush (1991–1992)
- 20 February – Dodgem (1991)
- 21 February – Doctor at the Top (1991)
- 25 February – Radio Roo (1991–1993)
- 4 March – Taking the Floor (1991)
- 30 March – Fast Friends (1991)
- 2 April – Kinsey (1991–1992)
- 12 April – The Sharp End (1991)
- 14 April – Tonight at 8.30 (1991) (Anthology)
- 30 April – Big Break (1991–2002)
- 3 May – The Girl from Tomorrow (1990)
- 14 May – All Good Things (1991)
- 27 May – Timeless Tales from Hallmark (1990–1991)
- 13 July – Gravedale High (1990)
- 19 July – Murder in Eden (1991)
- 20 July – Roy's Raiders (1991)
- 31 August – The House of Eliott (1991–1994)
- 1 September – Trainer (1991–1992)
- 3 September – 2point4 Children (1991–1999)
- 25 September – Specials (1991)
- 26 September
  - Get Your Own Back (1991–2003)
  - Spider! (1991)
  - Brum (1991–1994, 2001–2002)
- 4 October – The Legend of Prince Valiant (1991–1993)
- 7 October – Sea Trek (1991)
- 17 October – So You Think You've Got Troubles (1991)
- 25 October
  - Superbods (1991–1993)
  - Take Two (1991–1996)
- 27 October – Jute City (1991)
- 11 November
  - Watt on Earth (1991–1992)
  - Lifesense (1991)
- 14 November
  - Dark Season (1991)
  - An Actor's Life For Me (1991)
- 17 November
  - Ashenden (1991)
  - Merlin of the Crystal Cave (1991)
- 23 November – Noel's House Party (1991–1999)
- 29 December – Auntie's Bloomers (1991–2001)
- 31 December – Hogmanay Live (1991–present)
- Unknown – Clarissa Explains It All (1991–1994)

=== BBC2 ===
- 9 January – Parnell and the Englishwoman (1991)
- 1 February – Lazarus and Dingwall (1991)
- 14 February – The Fresh Prince of Bel-Air (1990–1996)
- 20 March – For the Greater Good (1991)
- 10 April – Sleepers (1991)
- 4 May – The Wolvis Family (1991)
- 8 May – Birthrights (1991–1993)
- 10 May – The Real McCoy (1991–1996)
- 30 July – Johnson and Friends (1990–1997)
- 16 September – Standing Room Only (1991–1994)
- 17 September – Bottom (1991–1995)
- 25 September – The Men's Room (1991)
- 4 October – The Power and the Glory (1991)
- 5 October – Performance (1991–1998)
- 6 October – The Boy from Andromeda (1991)
- 11 October – Mystery Train (1991)
- 13 October – Blood and Honey (1991)
- 30 October – Children of the North (1991)
- 14 November – Murder Most Horrid (1991–1999)
- 23 November – Moving Pictures (1991–1996)
- 27 November – Clarissa (1991)

=== ITV ===
- 3 January – Gawain and the Green Knight (1991)
- 4 January – Devices and Desires (1991)
- 5 January – Palmer (1991)
- 7 January – Toucan Tecs (1991–1992)
- 8 January – Rod 'n' Emu (1991)
- 13 February – Shrinks (1991)
- 19 February – Fiddlers Three (1991)
- 24 February – Trouble in Mind (1991)
- 12 March – Jumble (1991–1992)
- 16 March – The Winjin' Pom (1991)
- 22 March – Movies, Games and Videos (1991–2001)
- 26 March – The Diamond Brothers: South by South East (1991)
- 2 April – The Advocates (1991–1992)
- 7 April
  - The Darling Buds of May (1991–1993)
  - Prime Suspect (1991–2006)
- 10 April – A Murder of Quality (1991)
- 12 April – Finders Keepers (1991–1996, 2006)
- 3 May – Second Thoughts (1991–1994)
- 17 May – A Perfect Hero (1991)
- 26 May – The Black Candle (1991)
- 28 May – The Tuesday Special (1991–1997)
- 2 June – The Black Velvet Gown (1991)
- 3 June
  - Hope It Rains (1991–1992)
  - In Suspicious Circumstances (1991–1996)
- 10 June – Soldier Soldier (1991–1997)
- 11 June – Selling Hitler (1991)
- 5 July – Rich Tea and Sympathy (1991)
- 7 July – Chimera (1991)
- 15 July – Plaza Patrol (1991)
- 17 July – James Randi: Psychic Investigator (1991)
- 19 July – Very Big Very Soon (1991)
- 21 July – Great Expectations (1991)
- 1 August – Adventures on Kythera (1991–1992)
- 2 September – Tiny Toon Adventures (1990–1992)
- 4 September
  - Grotbags (1991–1993)
  - TV Mayhem (1991)
  - Fender Bender 500 (1990)
  - Monster Tails (1990)
  - Bill & Ted's Excellent Adventures (1990–1991)
- 6 September
  - Victor and Hugo (1991–1992)
  - Get Stuffed (1991–1994)
- 11 September – Thatcher: The Final Days (1991)
- 16 October – Time Riders (1991)
- 17 October – Captain Zed and the Zee Zone (1991–1992)
- 20 November – The Chestnut Soldier (1991)
- November – Cartoon World (1991–1992)
- 28 November – Stanley and the Women (1991)
- 29 November – Gone to the Dogs (1991)
- 30 November – Beetlejuice (1989–1991)
- 1 December – TaleSpin (1990–1991)
- 8 December – Red Fox (1991)
- 15 December – Heroes II: The Return (1991)
- 20 December – To Be the Best (1991)
- 21 December – Barrymore (1991–2000)
- 25 December – Brown Bear's Wedding (1991)
- Unknown
  - Beverly Hills, 90210 (1990–2000)
  - Captain Planet and the Planeteers (1990–1996)
  - Samurai Pizza Cats (1991)
  - Widget (1990–1992)

=== BBC Scotland ===
- 7 October – Restless Nation (1991–1996)

=== Channel 4 ===
- 21 February – The Orchid House (1991)
- 1 March – Garden Club (1991–1996)
- 1 May – Josie (1991)
- 4 May – Sharky & George (1990–1991)
- 21 May – Teenage Health Freak (1991–1993)
- 27 May – More Winners (1990)
- 6 June – G.B.H. (1991)
- 30 June – Family Pride (1991–1992)
- 6 July – Alfred J. Kwak (1989–1990)
- 7 July – Kid 'n Play (1990)
- 2 August – Packet of Three (1991–1992)
- 9 August – Dream On (1990–1996)
- 25 September – Paul Merton: The Series (1991–1993)
- 28 October – The Gravy Train Goes East (1991)
- 14 November – Secret History (1991–2004, 2013–2019)
- 1 December – The StoryTeller: Greek Myths (1990)
- 3 December – The Holy Family Album (1991)
- 24 December – Father Christmas (1991)
- 28 December – The Best of Friends (1991)

=== Sky One ===
- 12 January – Parker Lewis Can't Lose (1990–1993)
- 6 February – Anything for Money (1991–1992)
- 2 October – Something Is Out There (1988)

== Channels ==
=== New channels ===
Date	Channel
11 March	BBC World Service Television
1 October	The Comedy Channel

=== Defunct channels ===
Date	Channel
8 April	The Power Station

=== Rebranded channels ===
Date	Old Name	New Name
20 April	The Sports Channel	Sky Sports

== Television shows ==
=== Changes of network affiliation ===
Shows	Moved from	Moved to
The Mysterious Cities of Gold	BBC One	The Children's Channel
Widget	ITV	The Children's Channel
V	ITV	Sky One
Robin of Sherwood	ITV	Sky One
Thunderbirds	ITV	BBC Two
MacGyver	BBC One	ITV
Eureeka's Castle	Galaxy	Channel 4

=== Returning this year after a break of one year or longer ===
- 6 January – Lovejoy (1986, 1991–1994)
- 16 January – Van der Valk (1972–1973, 1977, 1991–1992)
- 10 April – The Two Ronnies for a 20th Anniversary special (1971–1987, 1991, 1996, 2005)
- 16 September – Postman Pat (1981, 1991–1992, 1994, 1996, 2003–2008)
- 14 October – Pebble Mill (1971–1986, 1991–1996)
- 14 December – Up Pompeii! (1969–1975, 1991–1992)

== Continuing television shows ==
=== 1920s ===
- BBC Wimbledon (1927–1939, 1946–2019, 2021–present)

=== 1930s ===
- Trooping the Colour (1937–1939, 1946–2019, 2023–present)
- The Boat Race (1938–1939, 1946–2019, 2021–present)
- BBC Cricket (1939, 1946–1999, 2020–2024)

=== 1940s ===
- Come Dancing (1949–1998)

=== 1950s ===
- Panorama (1953–present)
- This Week (1956–1978, 1986–1992)
- What the Papers Say (1956–2008)
- The Sky at Night (1957–present)
- Blue Peter (1958–present)
- Grandstand (1958–2007)

=== 1960s ===
- Coronation Street (1960–present)
- Songs of Praise (1961–present)
- World in Action (1963–1998)
- Top of the Pops (1964–2006)
- Match of the Day (1964–present)
- Mr. and Mrs. (1965–1999)
- Jackanory (1965–1996, 2006)
- Sportsnight (1965–1997)
- Call My Bluff (1965–2005)
- The Money Programme (1966–2010)
- The Big Match (1968–2002)

=== 1970s ===
- Rainbow (1972–1992, 1994–1997)
- Emmerdale (1972–present)
- Newsround (1972–present)
- Last of the Summer Wine (1973–2010)
- That's Life! (1973–1994)
- Wish You Were Here...? (1974–2003)
- Arena (1975–present)
- Jim'll Fix It (1975–1994)
- One Man and His Dog (1976–present)
- Grange Hill (1978–2008)
- The Paul Daniels Magic Show (1979–1994)
- Antiques Roadshow (1979–present)
- Question Time (1979–present)

=== 1980s ===
- Family Fortunes (1980–2002, 2006–2015, 2020–present)
- Children in Need (1980–present)
- 'Allo 'Allo! (1982–1992)
- Wogan (1982–1992)
- Brookside (1982–2003)
- Countdown (1982–present)
- Timewatch (1982–present)
- Right to Reply (1982–2001)
- Good Morning Britain (1983–1992, 2014–present)
- First Tuesday (1983–1993)
- Highway (1983–1993)
- Blockbusters (1983–93, 1994–95, 1997, 2000–01, 2012, 2019)
- Thomas the Tank Engine & Friends (1984–present)
- Wide Awake Club (1984–1992)
- Spitting Image (1984–1996)
- Surprise Surprise (1984–2001, 2012–2015)
- The Bill (1984–2010)
- Channel 4 Racing (1984–2016)
- Busman's Holiday (1985–1993)
- EastEnders (1985–present)
- The Cook Report (1987–1999)
- Crosswits (1985–1998)
- Screen Two (1985–1998)
- Telly Addicts (1985–1998)
- Blind Date (1985–2003, 2017–2019)
- Comic Relief (1985–present)
- Boon (1986–1992, 1995)
- ScreenPlay (1986–1993)
- Every Second Counts (1986–1993)
- Lovejoy (1986–1994)
- Beadle's About (1986–1996)
- The Chart Show (1986–1998, 2008–2009)
- Equinox (1986–2006)
- The Really Wild Show (1986–2006)
- Casualty (1986–present)
- All Clued Up (1987–1992)
- Going Live! (1987–1993)
- Watching (1987–1993)
- The Time, The Place (1987–1998)
- Allsorts (1987–1995)
- Going for Gold (1987–1996, 2008–2009)
- Chain Letters (1987–1997)
- ChuckleVision (1987–2009)
- Playbox (1987–1992)
- The New Statesman (1987–1994)
- After Henry (1988–1992)
- Park Avenue (1988–1992)
- Count Duckula (1988–1993)
- You Rang, M'Lord? (1988–1993)
- You Bet! (1988–1997)
- Playdays (1988–1997)
- Wheel of Fortune (1988–2001)
- London's Burning (1988–2002)
- On the Record (1988–2002)
- Fifteen to One (1988–2003, 2013–2019)
- This Morning (1988–present)
- Fun House (1989–1999)
- The Channel 4 Daily (1989–1992)
- Absolutely (1989–1993)
- KYTV (1989–1993)
- Press Gang (1989–1993)
- Birds of a Feather (1989–1998, 2014–2020)
- A Bit of Fry & Laurie (1989–1995)
- Byker Grove (1989–2006)
- Desmond's (1989–1994)
- Children's Ward (1989–2000)
- Mike and Angelo (1989–2000)
- Bodger & Badger (1989–1999)

=== 1990s ===
- The 8:15 from Manchester (1990–1991)
- The Mary Whitehouse Experience (1990–1992)
- No Job for a Lady (1990–1992)
- The Piglet Files (1990–1992)
- Families (1990–1993)
- Spatz (1990–1992)
- The $64,000 Question (1990–1993)
- Jeeves and Wooster (1990–1993)
- Waiting for God (1990–1994)
- Mr. Bean (1990–1995)
- The Crystal Maze (1990–1995, 2016–2020)
- The Dreamstone (1990–1995)
- Keeping Up Appearances (1990–1995)
- Turnabout (1990–1996)
- The Upper Hand (1990–1996)
- Drop the Dead Donkey (1990–1998)
- One Foot in the Grave (1990–2000)
- The Generation Game (1971–1982, 1990–2002)
- How 2 (1990–2006)
- Stars in Their Eyes (1990–2006, 2015)
- Rosie and Jim (1990–2000)
- MasterChef (1990–2001, 2005–present)

== Ending this year ==
- 11 February – About Face (1989–1991)
- 5 March – Rod, Jane and Freddy (1981–1991)
- 17 March – Grim Tales (1989–1991)
- 25 March – Shrinks (1991)
- 28 March – Gordon the Gopher (1991)
- 3 April – For the Greater Good (1991)
- 7 April – Brush Strokes (1986–1991)
- 16 April – Boom! (1990–1991)
- 20 April – The Winjin Pom (1991)
- 20 May – ThunderCats (1985–1989)
- 31 May
  - Tricky Business (1989–1991)
  - Alfonso Bonzo (1990–1991)
- 4 June – Chancer (1990–1991)
- 21 June – A Perfect Hero (1991)
- 8 July – The Joe Longthorne Show (1988–1991)
- 15 July – Takeover Bid (1990–1991)
- 22 July – Everybody's Equal (1989–1991)
- 28 July – Chimera (1991)
- 9 August – Rich Tea and Sympathy (1991)
- 21 August – James Randi: Psychic Investigator (1991)
- 28 August – I Can Do That (1988–1991)
- 29 August – The Play on One (1988–1991)
- 30 August – All Clued Up (1988–1991)
- 3 September – Clockwise (1989–1991)
- 14 September – The 8:15 from Manchester (1990–1991)
- 8 October – French Fields (1989–1991)
- 9 October – Never the Twain (1981–1991)
- 23 October – The Men's Room (1991)
- 31 October – 4 Square (1988–1991)
- 3 November – Bread (1986–1991)
- 12 November – Making Out (1989–1991)
- 18 November – Naked Video (1986–1991)
- 20 November – Children of the North (1991)
- 11 December – Clarissa (1991)
- 15 December – Red Fox (1991)
- 19 December – Stanley and the Women (1991)
- 20 December– Rainbow (1972–1991, 1994–1997)
- 26 December – Bergerac (1981–1991)
- 27 December – To Be the Best (1991)

== Births ==
- 2 January
  - Ben Hardy, actor (EastEnders, The Woman in White, The Girl Before)
  - Danny Miller, actor (Emmerdale)
- 21 January – Craig Roberts, Welsh actor (The Story of Tracy Beaker)
- 14 February – Charlie G. Hawkins, actor
- 17 February – Bonnie Wright, actress
- 28 February – Sarah Bolger, actress
- 27 April – Rebecca Ryan, actress
- 5 September – Skandar Keynes, actor
- 26 September – Charlotte Spencer, actress
- 14 October – Shona McGarty, actress
- 29 October – Toby Tarrant

== Deaths ==
Date	Name	Age	Cinematic Credibility
1 March	Katherine Blake	69	actress
24 March	Maudie Edwards	84	actress and singer
27 March	Ralph Bates	51	actor (Dear John)
17 April	Michael Pertwee	74	television screenwriter
4 May	Bernie Winters	60	comedian
8 May	Ronnie Brody	72	actor
15 May	Ronald Lacey	55	actor
18 May	Betty Alberge	69	actress (Coronation Street, Brookside)
14 June	Dame Peggy Ashcroft	83	actress
14 June	Bernard Miles	83	character actor, writer and director
18 June	Ronald Allen	60	actor (Crossroads)
8 July	Geoff Love	73	theme tune composer (Bless This House)
21 July	Jasmine Bligh	78	presenter
6 August	Arthur Pentelow	67	actor (Emmerdale)
10 August	Jessie Robins	86	actress
23 August	Innes Lloyd	65	television producer
29 August	Dallas Adams	44	actor
13 October	Donald Houston	67	actor
17 October	J. G. Devlin	84	actor
14 December	John Arlott	77	sports commentator
14 December	Robert Eddison	83	actor
15 December	Ray Smith	55	actor
19 December	Paul Maxwell	70	Canadian actor (Coronation Street)
21 December	Colin Douglas	79	actor

== See also ==
- 1991 in British music
- 1991 in British radio
- 1991 in Scottish television
- 1991 in the United Kingdom
- List of British films of 1991
