= Emu's TV programmes =

- Genre: Children's television
- Created by: Rod Hull
- Written by: Rod Hull
- Directed by: Hazel Lewthwaite (BBC); Mike Stephens (BBC); Colin Clews (ITV)
- Presented by: Rod Hull
- Country of origin: United Kingdom
- Original language: English

Production
- Producers: Peter Ridsdale Scott (BBC); Colin Clews (ITV)
- Production companies: Central Independent Television, BBC Manchester

Original release
- Network: BBC; ITV (CITV)

Emu is a British television puppet, modelled on the Australian flightless emu bird and operated by the performer Rod Hull. After appearing on a number of variety shows, he was given his own television series on the BBC, then on ITV.

== BBC ==
=== Emu's Broadcasting Company ===
Emu's Broadcasting Company (1975–1980) is a children's television series featuring Rod Hull and Emu running their own television station, EBC1, which parodied many BBC series of the time. Supporting Rod Hull and his emu puppet were Billy Dainty who played a James Bond pastiche called Captain Perceval and Barbara New who played the tea lady with Tom Chatto making occasional appearances as an in-vision continuity announcer.

All five series of Emu's Broadcasting Company were produced by BBC Manchester from the then-newly built New Broadcasting House on Oxford Road in Manchester city centre. The producer was Peter Ridsdale Scott and the director was Hazel Lewthwaite, followed in later series by Mike Stephens.

Initially shown in a weekday afternoon timeslot, later series were given a repeat run on Saturday evenings before the fifth and final run moved to a Sunday teatime slot.

==== Transmissions ====
- Series 1: 6 editions from 18 November 1975 – 23 December 1975
- Series 2: 6 editions from 12 November 1976 – 17 December 1976
- Series 3: 6 editions from 10 October 1977 – 14 November 1977
- Series 4: 8 editions from 26 October 1978 – 14 December 1978
- Series 5: 8 editions from 2 December 1979 – 27 January 1980
- Christmas Special: 24 December 1977

=== BBC Specials ===
Rod and Emu became staples of early-evening variety entertainment on or around Bank Holidays, and the following one-off specials were made for the BBC:

- Emu's Blackpool Walkabout: 29 August 1977 (30 Minutes)
- Emu's Cornish Walkabout: 28 August 1978 (30 Minutes)
- Emu's Scottish Walkabout: 27 August 1979 (35 Minutes)
- Emu's Magical Music Show: 27 December 1980 (35 Minutes)
- Emu's Magical Christmas Show: 27 December 1981 (35 Minutes)
- Emu's Magical Easter Show: 12 April 1982 (35 Minutes)

=== Rod and Emu's Saturday Specials (BBC) ===
- Series 1: 6 editions from 1 January 1983 – 5 February 1983

=== The Rod & Emu Show (BBC) ===
- Series 1: 6 editions from 28 January 1984 – 10 March 1984

== ITV ==
=== Emu's World ===
In 1981, Rod Hull was offered the opportunity to make a series for younger children by the newly-awarded ITV franchise Central Independent Television. This led to the birth of the Pink Windmill in which Rod and Emu lived, the green witch named Grotbags (played by the singer and comedienne Carol Lee Scott), and her hopeless assistant Croc. The premise of the show was simple: each week Grotbags attempted to steal Emu so that, once captured, (in Grotbags's own words) she would be able to use its "special powers" to control all the "brats" in the world. Children from the Corona Theatre School—referred to collectively as the Pink Windmill Kids—were on hand to offer protection and break into one or two song and dance routines per episode.

The show featured Rod Hull's chanted catchphrase "There's somebody at the door, oh, there's somebody at the door" every time a visitor rang the doorbell of the Pink Windmill—which 'sneezed' loudly when pressed. Series 1-5 were recorded at Elstree Studios between 1981-83

==== Transmission ====
- Series 1: 6 editions from 5 January 1982 – 9 February 1982
- Series 2: 6 editions from 27 October 1982 – 1 December 1982
- Series 3: 6 editions from 2 March 1983 – 6 April 1983
- Series 4: 6 editions from 7 September 1983 – 12 October 1983
- Special: Emu's World at Christmas – 21 December 1983
- Series 5: 6 editions from 9 March 1984 – 13 April 1984
- Special: Emu at Easter: 20 April 1984

=== Emu's All Live Pink Windmill Show ===
The success of Emu's World led to the series being expanded in mid-1984 from 20-minute to 42-minute episodes and re-branded as the Pink Windmill Show. The target age range was broadened, and the programme now featured viewer phone calls, a studio audience, games such as one in Grotbags's grotto based on the format of the "take the money or open the box" segment of Take Your Pick!, the Post Office (for viewers to send their letters and pictures), and Boggle's Kingdom—a mini-series featuring Rod's ancestor who is trapped in Tudor times. A subsequent addition was the Twin Schools section, which aimed to pair British schools with similar ones in Australia, Canada, or the US.

The singing and dancing of the Pink Windmill Kids was retained, extra character Robot Redford introduced, and the show in this format achieved enormous popularity (evidenced by being broadcast in the coveted Children's ITV slot of last thing on a Friday). Three series were broadcast live from 1984 to 1986 (despite the third run dropping "All Live" from the title), and in 1987 two series of Emu's Wide World were made. These followed a similar formula to the Pink Windmill Shows, but were pre-recorded, resulting in the phone-based Spin Quiz being replaced by Emu's Bargain Basement—an obstacle course in a supermarket. A final series of Emu's World aired in 1988, which retained Boggle's Kingdom and introduced an outdoors obstacle course despite being cut to a 20-minute run time. All series were produced and directed by Colin Clews for Central Independent Television and broadcast from the now-defunct East Midlands Television Centre in Nottingham.

==== Transmission ====
Emu's All Live Pink Windmill Show

- Series 1: 7 editions from 13 July 1984 – 24 August 1984
- Emu at Christmas – 25 December 1984
- Series 2: 13 editions from 12 April 1985 – 5 July 1985

Emu's Pink Windmill Show

- Series 1: 10 editions from 14 February 1986 – 25 April 1986
- Emu at Easter – 29 March 1986 (repeat of 1984 special)
- Emu at Christmas – 26 December 1986 (repeat of 1984 special)

Emu's Wide World

- Series 1: 9 editions from 3 April 1987 – 5 June 1987
- Series 2: 8 editions from 3 November 1987 – 5 January 1988

Emu's World

- Series 6: 13 editions from 12 May 1988 – 4 August 1988

=== EMU-TV ===
Following the demise of Emu's World, Rod Hull went to Canada and recorded a single series of EMU-TV, with the production company "Amalgamated Media Industries Inc". The Series was based heavily on his earlier Emu's Broadcasting Company series. This North American version had 24 episode each running for 29mins including ad-breaks, and included song numbers recorded in the UK with the Pink Windmill Kids. However Grotbags did not feature, instead his new co-stars were Murray Langston and Carolyn Scott, while Les Foubracs made regular guest appearances, who starred with Rod in most of the segments created.

Central Independent Television re-edited the series for a British audience which resulted in small number of Canadian sketches being replaced by additional segments featuring Grotbags. The series was reworked to 20min format over 22 episodes only.

==== Canadian Transmission ====
- Series 1: 24 editions: 1988

==== UK Transmission ====
- Series 1: 22 editions from 15 March 1989 – 20 September 1989
- Ep1 - Ep13: 15 March 1989 to 7th June 1989
- Ep14 - Ep22: 26 July 1989 to 20 September 1989

=== Rod 'n' Emu ===
Rod N Emu was an animated version of the live action series made by Filmfair, and was the last project to feature Hull, Emu and Scott together.

== Emu (2007) ==
Son of Rod Hull, Toby Hull created a version of the Emu series in 2007 for the CITV Channel with a 26-part series. with a second 26-part series being created in 2009.

The first episode of Emu's new series, simply called Emu, was broadcast on 8 October 2007. The first series was filmed in Belfast with shots at Queens Street Flats. The main characters are four-year-old Emu, (who turns five in the second series), and his owner, Toby (Toby Hull), a computer games designer. Toby has to keep Emu a secret from Ken Cole, a grumpy security guard. Toby's neighbours, who are children, seven-and-a-half-year old Charlie and eight-and-a-half-year-old Dani, help him to keep Emu a secret. Toby's other neighbour, Sophie, is the villainess of the show: an air hostess who becomes obsessed with making money off of Emu, but her plans always backfire on her. At the end of the first series, Emu and Toby moved back to Australia.

In June 2009, it was announced that a second series of the show with 26 episodes was produced by the Gibson Group a New Zealand film and broadcast company. Most of the cast was done by New Zealand actors. The plot in the second series is where Toby has a job in a kids' cafe. He meets Kelly (Bryony Skillington), the cafe manager, who is allergic to birds, especially Emu, although she still adores Emu. Cafe kids, seven-year-old Sam and eight-year-old Georgia live upstairs above the cafe. They are good friends with Emu. They all must watch out for Leo Leach (Toby Leach), the town inspector who is strict with pest control; he will close the cafe down if an animal is found.

The first episode of the second series was broadcast on 13 September 2009 on ITV at 9:45am. The second-series puppeteer was Nick Blake and the director was Danny Mulheron the same director of Paradise Café by the same company. It was shown on CITV with repeats until April 2014.

== Cast ==
Name	Time active	Roles	Episode count	Appearances
Rod Hull	1982–1989	Himself, Emu and King Boggle (1984–1988)	115 episodes	Emu's World Series 1, 2, 3, 4, 5, 6, Emu's World at Christmas, Emu at Easter, Emu's All Live Pink Windmill Show Series 1, 2, Emu's Pink Windmill Show Series 1, Emu at Christmas, Emu's Wide World, Emu TV
Carol Lee Scott	1982–1989	Grotbags	114 episodes	Emu's World Series 1, 2, 3, 4, 5, 6, Emu's World at Christmas, Emu at Easter, Emu's All Live Pink Windmill Show Series 1, 2, Emu's Pink Windmill Show Series 1, Emu at Christmas, Emu's Wide World, Emu TV
Freddie Stevens	1982–1989	Croc (1982–1984), Robot Redford (1984–1987), Grovel (1988–1989), Various other roles (1982–1989)	115 episodes	Emu's World Series 1, 2, 3, 4, 5, 6, Emu's World at Christmas, Emu at Easter, Emu's All Live Pink Windmill Show Series 1, 2, Emu's Pink Windmill Show Series 1, Emu at Christmas, Emu's Wide World, Emu TV
David Tate	1984–1988	Croc, Various other roles	41 episodes	Emu's All Live Pink Windmill Show Series 2, Emu's Pink Windmill Show Series 1, Emu at Christmas, Emu's Wide World
Glenn Munroe	1988–1989	Croc	35 episodes	Emu's World Series 6, Emu TV
Susan Maughan	1983–1988	Princess Hortensia	69 episodes	Emu's World Series 5, 6, Emu's World at Christmas, Emu at Easter, Emu's All Live Pink Windmill Show Series 1, 2, Emu's Pink Windmill Show Series 1, Emu at Christmas, Emu's Wide World
Carl Wayne	1983–1988	Odd Job John	69 episodes	Emu's World Series 5, 6, Emu's World at Christmas, Emu at Easter, Emu's All Live Pink Windmill Show Series 1, 2, Emu's Pink Windmill Show Series 1, Emu at Christmas, Emu's Wide World
Murray Langston	1989	Murray	22 episodes (UK), 24 episodes (Canada)	Emu TV

=== The Pink Windmill Kids ===
In the first series, The Pink Windmill Kids were all students of Pattison College, which at the time was known as The Betty Pattison Dancing Academy. Subsequently they came from the Corona Theatre School, known at the time as the Corona Stage School.

Abbie Shilling appeared in the most episodes of all the Pink Windmill Kids, closely followed by Kelly Rossiter.

A clip from the first live episode (13 July 1984), in which the Pink Windmill Kids enthusiastically introduce themselves before launching into a rendition of the Village People song "Can't Stop the Music", became an Internet meme in late 2016, and in early 2017 the kids in the sequence (with the exception of Spencer, who was unavailable) reunited to remake the segment in aid of Comic Relief.

Name	Time active	Episode count	Appearances
Richard Pitt (also the costume actor for croc)	1982	6 episodes	Emu's World Series 1
Donna Williams	1982	6 episodes	Emu's World Series 1
Joe Greco	1982–1986	51 episodes	Emu's World Series 2, 4, 5, Emu's World at Christmas, Emu at Easter, Emu's All Live Pink Windmill Show Series 1 & 2, Emu at Christmas, Emu's Pink Windmill Show series 1,
Debbie Harper	1982–1986	56 episodes	Emu's World Series 2, 3, 4, 5, Emu's World at Christmas, Emu at Easter, Emu's All Live Pink Windmill Show Series 1 & 2, Emu's Pink Windmill Show series 1
Emma Whitlock	1982–1985	47 episodes	Emu's World Series 2, 3, 4, 5, Emu's World at Christmas, Emu at Easter, Emu's All Live Pink Windmill Show Series 1 & 2, Emu at Christmas
Hugh Harper	1982–1984	33 episodes	Emu's World Series 2, 3, 4, 5, Emu's World at Christmas, Emu's All Live Pink Windmill Show Series 1, Emu at Christmas
Catrina Hylton	1982–1984	34 episodes	Emu's World Series 2, 3, 4, 5, Emu's World at Christmas, Emu at Easter, Emu's All Live Pink Windmill Show Series 1, Emu at Christmas
Lorraine Plummer	1982–1984	34 episodes	Emu's World Series 2, 3, 4, 5, Emu's World at Christmas, Emu at Easter, Emu's All Live Pink Windmill Show Series 1, Emu at Christmas
Anthony Hosier	1982–1984	34 episodes	Emu's World Series 2, 3, 4, 5, Emu's World at Christmas, Emu at Easter, Emu's All Live Pink Windmill Show Series 1, Emu at Christmas
Sarah Jeffs	1982–1984	34 episodes	Emu's World Series 2, 3, 4, 5, Emu's World at Christmas, Emu at Easter, Emu's All Live Pink Windmill Show Series 1, Emu at Christmas
Daniel Chamberlain	1982–1984, 1986	30 episodes	Emu's World Series 2, 3, 5, Emu's World at Christmas, Emu at Easter, Emu's Pink Windmill Show series 1
Kate Power	1982–1984	26 episodes	Emu's World Series 2, 3, 4, 5, Emu's World at Christmas, Emu at Easter
Emma-Louise Fox	1982–1984	25 episodes	Emu's World Series 2, 3, 4, 5, Emu's World at Christmas
Natalie Pennington	1982–1984	25 episodes	Emu's World Series 2, 3, 4, 5, Emu's World at Christmas
Aysha Mitchell	1982–1984	25 episodes	Emu's World Series 2, 3, 4, 5, Emu's World at Christmas
Natalie Payne	1982–1984	25 episodes	Emu's World Series 2, 3, 4, 5, Emu's World at Christmas
Dean Hosier	1982–1984	19 episodes	Emu's World Series 2, 4, 5, Emu's World at Christmas
Hope Lang	1982–1983	18 episodes	Emu’s World Series 2, 3, 4
Aaron Burchell	1982–1983	12 episodes	Emu's World Series 2, 3
Adele Graham	1982–1983	12 episodes	Emu's World Series 2, 3
Ann-Marie Dennis	1982–1983	12 episodes	Emu's World Series 2, 3
Julie Wright	1982	6 episodes	Emu's World Series 2
Natali Williams	1982	6 episodes	Emu's World Series 2
Tuhin Dasgupta	1982	6 episodes	Emu's World Series 2
Francesca Gerrard	1982	6 episodes	Emu's World Series 2
Debbie-Ann Greenwell	1982	6 episodes	Emu's World Series 2
Tiffany Humphreys	1982	6 episodes	Emu's World Series 2
Sheena Webb	1982	6 episodes	Emu's World Series 2
Jacqueline & Tracy Foster	1982	6 episodes	Emu's World Series 2
James Jeffs	1982	6 episodes	Emu's World Series 2
Sean	1982	6 episodes	Emu's World Series 2
Mark Bishop	1983	6 episodes	Emu's World Series 3
Neil Hayden	1983	6 episodes	Emu's World Series 3
Liza Hayden	1983	6 episodes	Emu’s World Series 3
Stella	1983	6 episodes	Emu's World Series 3
Joanne Price	1983	6 episodes	Emu’s World Series 3
Robert Tappin	1983	6 episodes	Emu's World Series 3
Spencer Roberts	1983–1985	41 episodes	Emu's World Series 3, 4, 5, Emu's World at Christmas, Emu at Easter, Emu's All Live Pink Windmill Show Series 1 & 2, Emu at Christmas
Sarah Stone	1983, 1986–1989	68 episodes	Emu's World Series 3, 6, Emu's Pink Windmill Show Series 1, Emu's Wide World, Emu TV
Cliff Kelly	1983–1984	13 episodes	Emu's World Series 4, 5, Emu's World at Christmas
Deborah Tullick	1983–1984	13 episodes	Emu's World Series 4, 5, Emu's World at Christmas
Zara Kattan	1983	6 episodes	Emu's World Series 4
Alexa Solomons	1983	6 episodes	Emu's World Series 4
Joanna Tappin	1983	6 episodes	Emu's World Series 4
Abbie Shilling	1983–1989	90 episodes	Emu's World Series 5, 6, Emu's World at Christmas, Emu's All Live Pink Windmill Show Series 1 & 2, Emu at Christmas, Emu's Pink Windmill Show series 1, Emu's Wide World, Emu TV
Kelly Rossiter	1983–1989	83 episodes	Emu's World Series 5, 6, Emu's World at Christmas, Emu's All Live Pink Windmill Show Series 2, Emu at Christmas, Emu's Pink Windmill Show series 1, Emu's Wide World, Emu TV
Ian Morrison	1983–1984	7 episodes	Emu's World Series 5, Emu’s World at Christmas
Tammy Smallworth	1985–1988	40 episodes	Emu's All Live Pink Windmill Show Series 2, Emu's Pink Windmill Show series 1, Emu's Wide World
Peter Davies	1985–1986	23 episodes	Emu's All Live Pink Windmill Show Series 2, Emu's Pink Windmill Show series 1
Alistair Smith	1985	13 episodes	Emu's All Live Pink Windmill Show series 2
Alex Brennan	1985	13 episodes	Emu's All Live Pink Windmill Show series 2
Daryl Peck	1986–1988	27 episodes	Emu's Pink Windmill Show series 1, Emu's Wide World
Helen Neil	1986	10 episodes	Emu's Pink Windmill Show series 1
Gianni Fuccio	1987–1989	52 episodes	Emu's Wide World, Emu's World Series 6, Emu TV
Danny Hosier	1987–1989	52 episodes	Emu's Wide World, Emu's World Series 6, Emu TV
Claire Stock	1987–1988	30 episodes	Emu's Wide World, Emu's World Series 6
Nicholas Pinnock	1987–1988	30 episodes	Emu's Wide World, Emu's World Series 6
Cassie Shilling	1987–1988	30 episodes	Emu's Wide World, Emu's World Series 6
Tiffany Reed	1988–1989	35 episodes	Emu's World Series 6, Emu TV
Roy Merchant	1988	13 episodes	Emu's World Series 6
Alani Gibbon	1989	22 episodes	Emu TV
Lisa Bennett	1989	22 episodes	Emu TV
Natalie Smallworth	1989	22 episodes	Emu TV
Rocky Samrai	1989	22 episodes	Emu TV
