= The Good Old Days (British TV series) =

BBC TV light entertainment programme (1953–1983)

- Opening title (8 February 1974)
- Genre: Old Time Variety, music hall
- Presented by: Don Gemmell (first two shows); Leonard Sachs
- Country of origin: United Kingdom
- Original language: English
- No. of series: 30
- No. of episodes: 245

Production
- Producer: Barney Colehan
- Production location: Leeds City Varieties
- Running time: 45–60 minutes

Original release
- Network: BBC Television Service (1953–64); BBC1 (1964–83)
- Release: 20 July 1953 – 31 December 1983

The Good Old Days is a BBC television light entertainment programme produced by Barney Colehan which ran for 30 years from 20 July 1953 to 31 December 1983.

It was performed at the Leeds City Varieties and recreated an authentic atmosphere of the Victorian–Edwardian music hall with songs and sketches of the era performed in the style of the original artistes.

The audience dressed in period costume and joined in the singing, especially "Down at the Old Bull and Bush", which normally closed the show each week. The show was compered throughout its whole run (except for the first two shows) by Leonard Sachs, who introduced the acts from a desk situated at the side of the stage. In the course of its run it featured about 2,000 performers. Each show was up to an hour long.

== History ==
Early in 1953, Barney Colehan devised a one-off show entitled The Story of the Music Hall, presented by Deryck Guyler. The programme proved so popular that it was decided to create a series under the title of The Good Old Days.

The show was first broadcast on 20 July 1953, and the first two shows were compered by Don Gemmell. Early series of the show were broadcast live. The show included such performers such as Ray Alan, Terence Alexander, Arthur Askey, Hylda Baker, Josephine Baker, Maurice Baquet, Wally Boag, Georgia Brown, Dora Bryan, Peter Butterworth, Frank Carson, Roy Castle, Chaz Chase, George Chisholm, Chuckle Brothers, Ronnie Corbett, Gemma Craven, Bernard Cribbins, Jimmy Cricket, Barry Cryer, Windsor Davies, Anna Dawson, Les Dawson, Ken Dodd, Lonnie Donegan, Betty Driver, Arthur Duncan, Clive Dunn, Arthur English, Don Estelle, Fenella Fielding, Clinton Ford, Bruce Forsyth, Harold Goodwin, Dolores Gray, Larry Grayson, Anita Harris, Keith Harris, Patricia Hayes, Richard Hearne, Barbara Hicks, Thora Hird, Joyce Howard, Frankie Howerd, Sally Ann Howes, Roy Hudd, Rod Hull, John Inman, Hattie Jacques, Davy Kaye, Lila Kaye, Stubby Kaye, Grace Kennedy, David Kernan, Pat Kirkwood, Eartha Kitt, Danny La Rue, Little and Large, Lorna Luft, Benjamin Luxon, Vera Lynn, Kenneth McKellar, Julia McKenzie, Alfred Marks, Millicent Martin, Larry Marshall, Jessie Matthews, Bill Maynard, Joe Melia, Mary Millar, Spike Milligan, Ron Moody, Morecambe and Wise, Libby Morris, Peggy Mount, Des O'Connor, Tessie O'Shea, Bobby Pattinson, Bill Pertwee, Jon Pertwee, Wilfred Pickles, Bertice Reading, Beryl Reid, Mike Reid, Leslie Sarony, Terry Scott, Sandie Shaw, Anne Shelton, Bill Shine, Tod Slaughter, Marilyn Hill Smith, Tommy Steele, Joan Sterndale-Bennett, Freddie Stevens, Una Stubbs, Tony Sympson, Jimmy Tarbuck, Harry Towb, Tommy Trinder, Reg Varney, Frankie Vaughan, Norman Vaughan, Max Wall, Sheila White, Charlie Williams, Barbara Windsor, Mike and Bernie Winters, Norman Wisdom, Edward Woodward.

The series was inspired by the success of the "Ridgeway's Late Joys" at the Players' Theatre Club in London, a private members' club that ran fortnightly programmes of variety acts in London's West End. The club was originally founded by Leonard Sachs and business partner Peter Ridgeway.

Out of 245 episodes, 108 are believed to survive complete in the archives. Surviving editions were rebroadcast on BBC Four from December 2015 to February 2018, and again from January to June 2026.

On 16 December 1983, Goodbye to the Good Old Days was shown, a documentary celebrating the end of the 30-year run that year; Barry Cryer served as narrator for the documentary. The final show aired on New Year's Eve that year.
