= Freddie Stevens =

English actor (1934–2016)

- Born: Frederick William Humphreys; 29 March 1934
- Died: 26 January 2016 (aged 81); Bournemouth, Dorset
- Known for: Emu's TV programmes

Freddie Stevens (born Frederick William Humphreys; 29 March 1934–26 January 2016) was an English actor best known for his role in Tin Men in 1987, and various roles in Emu's TV programmes alongside Carol Lee Scott and Rod Hull. He played the role of Croc, Grotbags long suffering assistant from 1982 to 1984, the role of Robot Redford, Grotbags replacement assistant from 1984 to 1988 and Grovel the man servant from 1988 to 1989. He later appeared in the animated spin off show Rod 'n' Emu in 1991 as the voice of Croc and Redford. He appeared in Emu's programmes for almost ten years from 1982 to 1991 and over 100 episodes. He also spent many years performing in Pantomime alongside Hull and Scott.

His last television appearance was as himself in the 2003 documentary, Rod Hull: A Bird in the Hand.

He died on 26 January 2016 in Dorset at the age of 81.

== Filmography ==
=== Film ===
- Tin Men 1987

=== Television ===
- Emu's World 1982-1984, 1988
- Emu's All Pink Windmill Show 1984-1986
- Emu's Wide-World 1987-1988
- EMU-TV 1989
- Rod Hull: A Bird in the Hand 2003
