= Jeff Stevenson =

Jeff Stevenson may refer to:

- Jeff Stevenson (comedian) (born 1961), English comedian
- Jeff Stevenson (rugby league) (1932–2007), English rugby league footballer
