= Rod 'n' Emu =

- Created by: Rod Hull
- Developed by: FilmFair
- Written by: Rod Hull; Ian Sachs
- Voices of: Rod Hull; Carol Lee Scott; Freddy Stevens
- Music by: Keith Hopwood
- Country of origin: United Kingdom
- No. of seasons: 1
- No. of episodes: 13

Production
- Executive producer: David Yates
- Editors: Andi Sloss; Alec Jeakins; Simon Cox
- Running time: 22 minutes

Original release
- Network: ITV (CITV)
- Release: 8 January – 2 August 1991

Related
- EMU TV; Grotbags

Rod 'n' Emu is an English animated series shown on CITV in 1991.

It starred the voices of Rod Hull who created and wrote all the episodes starring as himself, with Carol Lee Scott as Grotbags and Freddie Stevens as her assistants Croc the crocodile and Redford the robot.

This was the last series to feature Hull, Emu and Scott before the latter starred in her own TV series Grotbags. The show was made by FilmFair for Central Independent Television and thirteen episodes were aired.

== Premise ==
The show followed the fortunes of Rod and his pet Emu whose lives are in danger of Grotbags and her companions.

== Cast ==
- Rod Hull as Rod
- Carol Lee Scott as Grotbags
- Freddie Stevens as Croc/Redford

== Crew ==
- Created by: Rod Hull
- Written by: Rod Hull and Ian Sachs
- Animators: Malcolm Bourne, Geoff Loynes
- Backgrounds: Geoff Chennell
- Trace and Paint Supervisor: Christine Courtney
- Tracers: Angela Bristow, Christine Farrington, Alma Sachs, Marie Turner
- Painters: Jo Beheit, Lynne Sachs, Tessa Farrington
- Checkers: Debra Thaine, David Schwartz
- Camera: Andrew Coates, Isabelle Perrichon, Craig Simpson, Roy Watford
- Studio Assistant: David Birch
- Editors: Andi Sloss, Alec Jeakins, Simon Cox
- Music: Keith Hopwood
- Directed by: Dick Horn and Ian Sachs
- Assistant Producer: Peter Lewis
- Executive Producer: David Yates
- A FilmFair Production for Central Independent Television
- © FilmFair/Rod Hull 1991
- © Hibou Productions Ltd/FilmFair Ltd 1991
- A Central Presentation

== Transmission guide ==
- Series 1a: 2 editions from 8 January 1991 – 15 January 1991
- Series 1b: 11 editions from 24 May 1991 – 2 August 1991
