= List of concerts in Hyde Park =

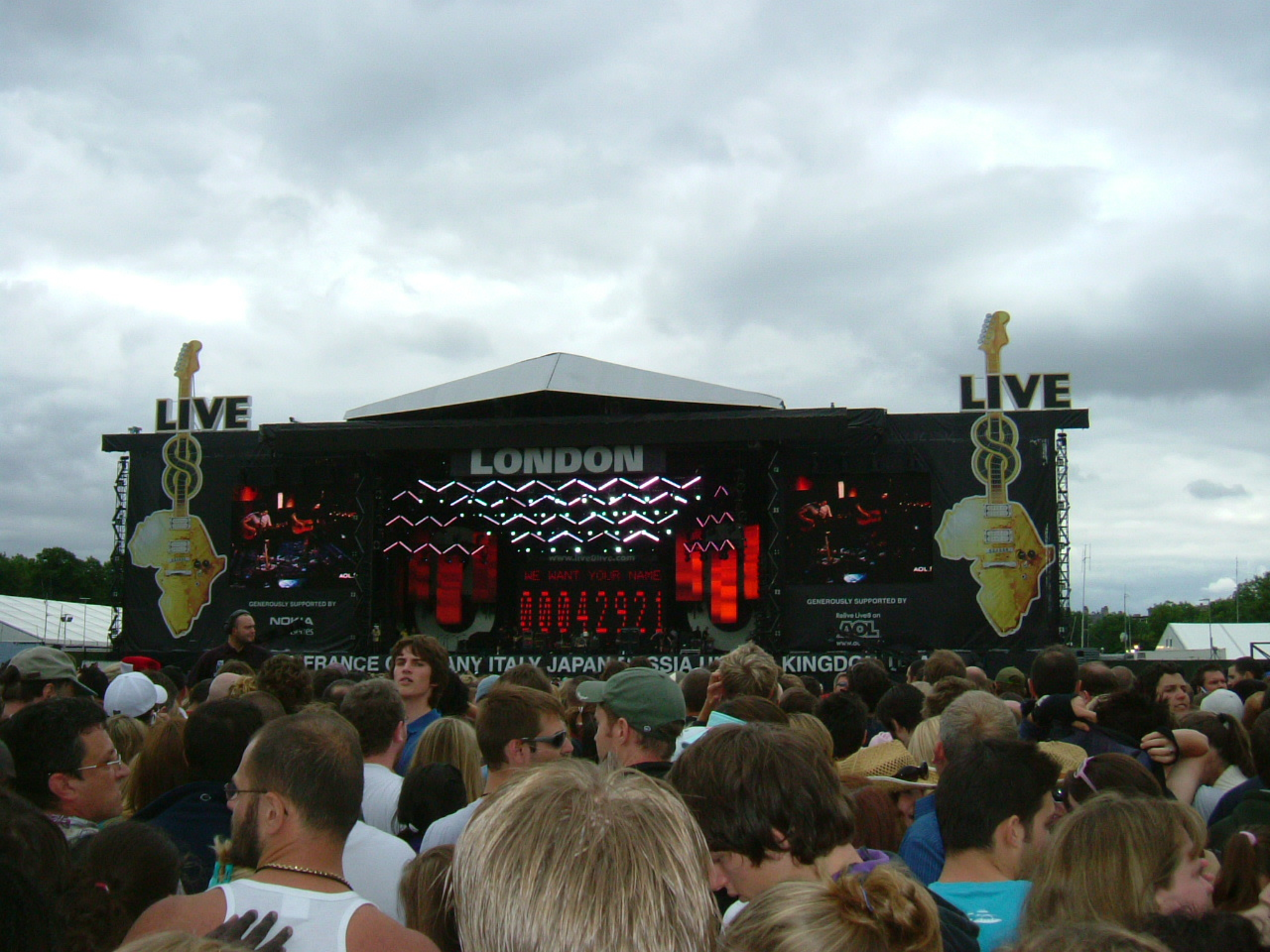
The main Live 8 concert in Hyde Park on 2 July 2005

Hyde Park in London, England, has been a venue for rock music concerts since the late 1960s. The music management company Blackhill Enterprises held the first rock concert there on 29 June 1968, attended by 15,000 people. On the bill were Pink Floyd, Roy Harper, Tyrannosaurus Rex and Jethro Tull. The supergroup Blind Faith (featuring Eric Clapton and Steve Winwood) played their debut gig in Hyde Park on 7 June 1969. The Rolling Stones headlined a concert with supporting act King Crimson (later released as The Stones in the Park) on 5 July that year, two days after the death of founding member Brian Jones. The early gigs from 1968–71 were free events, while later concerts were pay-to-enter.

The park has also played host to music festivals, including Party in the Park between 1998 and 2004, The Wireless Festival between 2005 and 2012, Hard Rock Calling between 2006 and 2012, Radio 2 Live in Hyde Park since 2011 and Barclaycard presents British Summer Time since 2013.

== 1960s ==
- 1968 – Pink Floyd, Fleetwood Mac, Roy Harper, Jethro Tull, Tyrannosaurus Rex, The Nice, The Pretty Things, Ten Years After, Traffic, Family
- 1969 – Blind Faith, Alexis Korner, Donovan, Richie Havens, Al Stewart, Edgar Broughton Band, King Crimson, Third Ear Band, Soft Machine, The Rolling Stones, Quintessence, The Deviants

== 1970s ==
- 1970 – Canned Heat, Pink Floyd, Eric Burdon and War, John Sebastian, Kevin Ayers (And The Whole World), Stoneground
- 1971 – Grand Funk Railroad, Roy Harper, Steve Hillage, Humble Pie, King Crimson
- 1974 – Roy Harper with David Gilmour, Roger McGuinn, Kevin Ayers, Gong and Nico
- 1975 – Supercharge, Wigwam
- 1976 – Kiki Dee, Steve Hillage, Queen, Supercharge

== 1980s ==
- 1986 – Elvis Costello

== 1990s ==
- 1991 – Luciano Pavarotti - Pavarotti in the Park
- 1996 – The Prince's Trust Benefit Concert, Eric Clapton
- 1998 – The Corrs, Michael Flatley, Shania Twain, Tina Arena
- 1999 – Bryan Adams, Sinéad O'Connor, Cliff Richard, Simply Red, Lisa Stansfield

== 2000s ==
- 2000 – Elton John, Bon Jovi, Kylie Minogue, Westlife, Ronan Keating, Christina Aguilera, The Corrs, Travis, Lionel Richie, Steps, Backstreet Boys (Note: AJ McLean was absent from The Backstreet Boys 2000 concert tour because his grandfather had surgery, so Elton John temporarily stood in for him.)
- 2001 – The Beach Boys, Jeff Beck, Elton John, Tom Jones, Status Quo, Sting, Supersister
- 2002 – Bryan Adams, Joseph Arthur, The Cure, The Cranes, Meat Loaf, Mogwai, Paul Weller, Supertramp
- 2003 – Bryan Adams, Bon Jovi, Busted, Live, Sinéad O'Connor, Shania Twain, Yes
- 2004 – The Everly Brothers, The Red Hot Chili Peppers, (Note: The Red Hot Chili Peppers performed three concerts in 2004, over the space of one week, which set a then-record for the highest-grossing concerts at a single venue in history.) Simon & Garfunkel, Snow Patrol
- 2005 – Feeder, Idlewild, Live 8, Sinéad O'Connor, Queen + Paul Rodgers, R.E.M., Razorlight, Johnathan Rice, The Scissor Sisters, Simply Red, Patti Smith
- 2006 – Angels & Airwaves, The Who, Roger Waters w/ Nick Mason, Goldfrapp, Foo Fighters, Motörhead, Queens of the Stone Age
- 2007 – Aerosmith, Peter Gabriel, The White Stripes, Kaiser Chiefs, Daft Punk, Faithless
- 2008 – A Hawk and a Hacksaw, Eric Clapton, Jack Johnson, The Police, Morrissey, and The Nelson Mandela 90th Birthday Tribute Concert
- 2009 – Blur, The Counterfeit Stones and Florence + The Machine, Bruce Springsteen and the E Street Band, Neil Young

== 2010s ==
- 2010 – The Black Keys, Tom Jones, Paul McCartney, Kings of Leon, Patti Smith, The Whigs
- 2011 – Bon Jovi, Westlife, Arcade Fire, Kings of Leon, Mumford & Sons, The Musgraves, The Walkmen, Paul Weller and The Zac Brown Band
- 2012 – Blur, Soundgarden, Bruce Springsteen, Paul Simon, Madonna
- 2013 – The Rolling Stones, Bon Jovi, JLS, Lionel Richie, Ray Davies, Jennifer Lopez as part of Barclaycard presents British Summer Time
- 2014 – Electric Light Orchestra, The Libertines, Neil Young, Arcade Fire, McBusted, Tom Jones, Black Sabbath as part of Barclaycard presents British Summer Time
- 2015 – Blur, Kylie Minogue, The Strokes, Taylor Swift and The Who have been announced as the headliners of Barclaycard presents British Summer Time for June 2015.
- 2016 – Massive Attack, Florence + The Machine, Carole King, Mumford & Sons, Take That and Stevie Wonder have been announced as the headliners of Barclaycard presents British Summer Time for July 2016.
- 2016 – Carole King performed her breakthrough album Tapestry as part of British Summer Time The concert was later shown in movie theatres and on PBS and released as a live album.
- 2017 – Phil Collins, Green Day, Justin Bieber, Kings of Leon, The Killers and Tom Petty & The Heartbreakers have been announced as the headliners of Barclaycard presents British Summer Time for June/July 2017.
- 2018 – Roger Waters, The Cure, Eric Clapton, Michael Bublé, Bruno Mars, Paul Simon
- 2019 – Celine Dion, Pet Shop Boys, Bananarama, Westlife, Emeli Sande, Status Quo, Robbie Williams, Simply Red, Kelsea Ballerini, Clean Bandit

== 2020s ==
- 2022
  - Elton John: 24 June
  - The Rolling Stones: 25 June and 3 July
  - Eagles: 26 June
  - Adele: 1 and 2 July
  - Pearl Jam: 8 and 9 July
  - Duran Duran: 11 July
- 2023
  - Pink: 24 June and 25 June
  - Guns N' Roses: 30 June
  - Take That: 1 July
  - Blackpink: 2 July
  - Springsteen & E Street Band: 6 July and 8 July
  - Billy Joel: 7 July
  - Lana Del Rey: 9 July
- 2024
  - All Things Orchestral: 28 June
  - SZA: 29 June
  - Kings of Leon: 30 June
  - Morgan Wallen: 4 July
  - Andrea Bocelli: 5 July
  - Robbie Williams: 6 July
  - Shania Twain: 7 July
  - Stevie Nicks: 12 July
  - Kylie Minogue: 13 July
  - Stray Kids: 14 July
