= Emu (puppet) =

- Logo for the 2000s revival series Emu
- Created by: Rod Hull
- Portrayed by: Rod Hull (1960s–1999); Toby Hull (2003–present)

In-universe information
- Species: Emu
- Gender: Male

Emu is a puppet emu which was given to British entertainer Rod Hull in the 1960s while he was presenting a children's breakfast television programme in Australia. Hull adopted the mute puppet for his cabaret act, and took it with him to the United Kingdom when he returned in 1970. The character was given a mischievous and sometimes aggressive onstage persona, attacking celebrity guests (and Hull himself) for comic effect, notably on Michael Parkinson's chat show in 1976. Hull and Emu also appeared on several episodes of The Hudson Brothers' comedy show in the United States.

== History ==
=== 1970s and 1980s television series ===
During the 1970s, Hull and Emu achieved national fame in the UK with their BBC series Emu's Broadcasting Company. The duo moved to ITV in the 1980s, where a succession of shows was produced concerning their ongoing rivalry with Grotbags, a witch played by Carol Lee Scott.

=== 2000s revival ===
A new series, simply titled Emu, with Toby Hull replacing his father (who had died in 1999), was produced in Belfast and broadcast on ITV in 2007. A second series was produced in New Zealand and broadcast in 2009.
