= Barney Colehan =

English radio and television producer (1914–1991)

Barney Colehan MBE (19 January 1914 – 21 September 1991) was an English radio and television producer, best known for producing and directing The Good Old Days throughout its 30-year transmission on BBC Television.

== Early life ==
Colehan was born Bernard Colehan in 1914 in Calverley, Pudsey, West Riding of Yorkshire. His father worked in a textile mill and his mother was a charwoman. He had a younger brother Edward Joseph Colehan, who was a qualified Pharmacist, and manager of the retail dispensary and chemist's shop for Chas F Thackray Ltd, Great George Street, Leeds He was educated at St Bede's Grammar School. He left school when he was 16 and began working in a pharmacy. He also began pursuing his interest in theatre, acting and directing with a local amateur operatic society, of which he became a president in the 1930s.

In 1939, at the outbreak of the Second World War, he joined the army. While in military service, he sent radio scripts to the British Forces Network in London, which resulted in him being recruited by the variety department. He soon became a producer for the Network. By the end of the war, he had risen to the rank of major. He left the army in 1947.

== Career ==
Returning to civilian life, Colehan moved into working for the BBC. He first came to prominence in 1948 as the producer responsible for the radio quiz programme Have A Go, hosted by Wilfred Pickles. The programme was recorded on location at community centres and town halls across the UK. Colehan would personally hand the prize money to the winning contestant, in response to the audience cry of "Give him (or her) the money, Barney!"

As a light entertainment producer Colehan produced the first programme when television arrived in the North of England in 1951. One of his early successes was Top Town, a talent show pitting contestants from neighbouring towns against each other.

His longest running success was The Good Old Days, which started in 1953 and was on air for 30 years, making it the longest-running light entertainment programme ever broadcast. Colehan tested his idea for a television variety show with a pilot broadcast in 1952 from the City Varieties Theatre in Leeds, entitled The Story of the Music-Hall. Colehan also came up with the idea of dressing the audience in Edwardian costumes. Many high-profile entertainers appeared on the show, including Morecambe and Wise, Ken Dodd and Spike Milligan. The programme was hosted by Leonard Sachs. The show eventually became so popular that the waiting list for tickets had to be closed, when it rose to a total of 25,000 people.

Colehan was also involved in other major television successes. Colehan had the idea in 1963 of making a TV version of Jimmy Savile's popular Radio Luxembourg show Teen and Twenty Disc Club. He produced the pilot which later became Top of the Pops. In August 1966, Colehan brought It's a Knockout to the screen which ran for 16 years under his watch.

In 1981, he was made a Member of the Order of the British Empire for services to entertainment. The following year, he was awarded the British Academy of Composers & Songwriters Gold Badge for lasting contribution to the UK's entertainment industry.

He retired from the BBC in 1983, after the last broadcast of The Good Old Days. In 1985, he directed a television special for Channel 4 entitled Don't Say Goodbye, Miss Ragtime!, which featured various performances of ragtime music on a riverboat.

Barney suffered a stroke whilst playing golf (Otley), his favourite pastime, and died on 21 September 1991 in hospital at Rawdon, near Leeds.

== Personal life ==
Barney Colehan, who was married to Monica, had two children named Margaret and Eileen. He was a resident of Yorkshire and never lived outside of the area, despite his extensive travels. Additionally, Barney was a member at Otley Golf Club. Furthermore, he has two great granddaughters named Cara Liptrot and Madeline Liptrot.
