= Marty Morton =

Australian entertainer (1941–2024)

- Born: 30 September 1941; England
- Died: 6 September 2024 (aged 82); Australia
- Occupations: TV presenter, actor, ventriloquist

Marty Morton (30 September 1941 – 6 September 2024) was an English-born Australian TV presenter and actor in television, theatre and commercials in Australia and other countries including England. He started his career as a stage performer and ventriloquist

== Career ==
Morton appeared on Crackerjack and Seaside Special in England. In Australia he acted in TV shows including Spyforce, Division 4, The Young Doctors, All Saints, and The Restless Years.

When comedian Rod Hull and his Emu puppet character left the Super Flying Fun Show and Australia, a duplicate of Emu was made so the character could continue on the show. Morton took over Hull's co-hosting position on the Super Flying Fun Show alongside Marilyn Mayo. In 2003 he was a guest on Channel 4 documentary on Hull, Rod Hull: A Bird in the Hand.

Morton's pantomime credits include Cinderella, Dick Whittington, Mother Goose and Our Own-Bush Homebush. He entertained with his 'sidekicks' Emu, Camel, Jake the Peg and Talkin' Horse.

Morton appeared with Dorothy Lamour, Diana Trask, Florence Henderson, Al Martino and Human Nature.

Among his talents was the production of sets and props.

== Personal life and death ==
Marty Morton was born in the north of England on 30 September 1941, and later emigrated to Australia.

Morton died from cancer on 6 September 2024, at the age of 82.

== Awards ==
=== Mo Awards ===
The Australian Entertainment Mo Awards (commonly known informally as the Mo Awards), were annual Australian entertainment industry awards. They recognise achievements in live entertainment in Australia from 1975 to 2016. Marty Morton won three awards in that time.

Year	Nominee / work	Award	Result (wins only)
1982	Marty Morton	Versatile Variety Act of the Year	Won
1983	Marty Morton	Versatile Variety Act of the Year	Won
1986	Marty Morton	Versatile Variety Act of the Year	Won
