= Super Flying Fun Show =

- Cover for 1973 tie-in album
- Genre: Children's television
- Starring: Marilyn Mayo
- Country of origin: Australia
- Original language: English
- No. of seasons: 9

Production
- Producer: Jim Badger
- Production locations: Sydney, New South Wales
- Running time: 90 then 120 minutes

Original release
- Network: TCN-9 for GTV-9
- Release: 1970 – 1979

The Super Flying Fun Show was a live weekday morning television programme aimed at children. It was broadcast daily from TCN 9 in Sydney and on relay in Melbourne on GTV 9. The show was produced by Jim Badger.

Super Flying Fun Show replaced the original Today show with Mike Walsh launched from GTV 9 in 1968. When Today was linked with TCN 9 and the compere changed to Tony Charlton, recently recruited Victorian regional stations began to drop the show. By October 1969 Today had been cancelled, and a mixture of live children's entertainment and cartoons on air between 7AM and 8:30AM was announced, to begin on 13 October 1969. This announcement proved to be premature, however the show was running in early December, 1969. It was an instant success: reputedly it received '26,000 letters from kids' in the first month of broadcast. The timeslot was extended to 9:00AM in early March 1970.

== Hosts, guests and recurring characters ==
The host throughout the program's duration was the dancer, singer and television personality Marilyn Mayo (1944-2025) known on the show as "Miss Marilyn". Mayo had appeared on Tonight with Dave Allen and in the early days of the Super Flying Fun Show she was simultaneously a featured cast member of The Sound of Music hosted by Barry Crocker. In 1973 she was also co-host, with Ernie Sigley, of Sigley on Saturday.

In the first two years of the show Mayo was joined by British-born comedian Rod Hull. Opening titles consisted of Hull as the character Caretaker Clot (also known as Clotty the Janitor) walking to the TCN 9 transmitter tower and flicking a big switch. Clot was already a popular police officer character in the channel's Kaper Cops, a local homage to The Keystone Cops. Its director, Stefan Sargent, claimed this show was a "direct steal of the American Keystone Kops". In 1970 Hull told the Women's Weekly's Nan Musgrove that 'In the opening SFFS we made Clot leave the police force and join Channel 9 as Caretaker Clot.'

A Channel 4 TV documentary about Hull titled Rod Hull: A Bird in the Hand, Jim Badger states that he had to persuade Hull to work with Emu, who Badger had found amongst Channel 9's props, and that Hull had told him 'I don't want to be a puppeteer'. The success of the puppet clearly changed Hull's mind and Hull returned to Britain in 1971. He was replaced by Marty Morton who was also a co-producer. Badger claims that Hull 'had another Emu made' before returning to Britain and the original Emu remained on the Super Flying Fun Show. Hull was an almost instant success in the UK; he and Mayo (and Emu) were reunited in mid-1973 on an Australian television special, Rod Hull, Emu and Friends.

Another character, Skeeter the Paperboy or "Amos" Skeeter (a pun on 'a mosquito'), was played by James Kemsley. Kemsley went on to host Skeeter's Cartoon Corner until 1973 when Daryl Somers took over the show. Kemsley later wrote and illustrated the newspaper comic strip Ginger Meggs.

Other Super Flying Fun Show regulars included Wing Ding (a human-sized chicken sponsoring a snack food from Arnott's), the Paddle Pop Lion (a human-sized lion sponsoring a brand of ice-cream from Streets), and Freddo Frog (a human-sized frog sponsoring a brand of chocolate for Cadbury).

While the show attracted criticism for this shameless commercialism, it also took an educative role. One example of this is when primary school headmistress Anne Price began reading and reviewing children's books once a week on the show, starting in 1974. Another was the Department of Health-funded segments under the title 'Go Health', which promoted healthy activities - such as an anti-smoking message - to children; 'Go Health' was reputedly viewers' second-favourite segment on the program after the cartoons.

Daily competitions included Miss Marilyn spinning a prize wheel. Contestants were rung by telephone. Live music was played by regular artists Marshall and his Portable Music Machine and country singer Smoky Dawson. The show also featured dancer Ross Hutchison and the Jeral Puppets. Between the live segments were cartoons and other, usually US-sourced, programming.

Merchandise from the show included an LP record and a Milton Bradley board game.

== Critics and competitors ==
In 1977, the program was decreed third of the three worst shows for children on Australian television by a group of Melbourne viewers polled by the Australian Broadcasting Control Board. The other two in this category were Get Smart and "Daryl and Ossie" (that is, Hey Hey it's Saturday).

Throughout the decade, Super Flying Fun Show competed with an hour of Sesame Street on the ABC as well as Good Morning with Rosemary (later known as Breakfast-A-Go-Go) in Sydney, Fredd Bear's Breakfast-A-Go-Go in Melbourne and later, Non Stop Cartoon Carnival and The Early Bird Show on ATV 0. A similar show with the same title was also produced in Perth with host Dianna Hammond. In Adelaide, the Super Duper Flying Fun Show was hosted by Ric Marshall, Bozo the Clown and Joanne White; in 2012, at the age of 83, Marshall was found guilty of an extensive series of sex offences against young boys and sentenced to 25 years' home detention.

== Demise and legacy ==
The last newspaper listing for the Super Flying Fun Show is in the Melbourne Age for Wednesday, 5 December 1979. It was replaced by cartoons. In 1981, Marilyn Mayo became a regular cast member on Holiday Island. Just as the Super Flying Fun Show had replaced a show called Today, the slot was filled two and a half years later by another show of the same name: Today is a news and current affairs program originally hosted by Steve Liebmann and Sue Kellaway. It commenced on 28 June 1982 and is still running over forty years later.

It is not known if any of the episodes of Super Flying Fun Show were kinescoped or if any videotapes were made, and it is probable that the series is lost: aside from a small amount of photographic documentation, the National Film and Sound Archive records two incidents preserved on a 'goof reel' in its holdings.
