= Grotbags =

British children's television series (1991–1993)

- Genre: Children's television series
- Created by: Carol Lee Scott
- Directed by: Colin Clews
- Starring: Carol Lee Scott; Richard Coombs; Francis Wright
- Music by: Colin Campbell
- Country of origin: United Kingdom
- Original language: English
- No. of series: 3
- No. of episodes: 29

Production
- Executive producer: Lewis Rudd
- Producer: Colin Clews
- Production location: Lenton Lane Studios
- Camera setup: Multi-camera
- Running time: 15 minutes
- Production company: Central Independant Television

Original release
- Network: ITV
- Release: 4 September 1991 – 10 February 1993

Grotbags is a British children's television programme, which ran for three series between 1991 and 1993, about a fictional witch named Grotbags. It is a spin-off of multiple earlier Rod Hull and Emu shows. Very much in the mould of the traditional pantomime villain, Grotbags was played by actress, singer and comedian Carol Lee Scott in a costume comprising vivid green make-up and wig and a witch's cape and hat. Each episode co-starred Francis Wright and Richard Coombs in multiple puppet roles.

== Premise ==
The character Grotbags originally appeared in the Rod Hull television show Emu's World in 1982 and she remained the principal antagonist throughout the rest of the decade in the programme's various other incarnations (Emu's All Live Pink Windmill Show, Emu's Wide World, and 1989's EMU-TV), plus the subsequent animated series Rod 'n' Emu. In 1991, Central Independent Television awarded Grotbags her own solo spin-off, which was created by Carol Lee Scott and puppeteer Richard Coombs, written by Bob Hescott, and directed by Colin Clews.

A total of 29 episodes were made, with each revolving around Grotbags and her minions at Gloomy Fortress and their day-to-day lives.

== Principal characters ==
- Gertrude L.G. Grotbags – The self-styled "bestest witch in the whole wide world"
- Colin the Bat – A dim-witted bat who cannot fly very well
- Doris the Dodo – The last dodo, rescued by Grotbags from a desert island
- Norman Nettle – A grumpy nettle plant
- Grumble – Grotbags' cauldron
- Lumpy: – A mass of left-over spells who lives in Grumble

== Transmission guide ==
- Series 1: 13 editions from 4 September 1991 – 18 December 1991
- Series 2: 10 editions from 9 September 1992 – 11 November 1992
- Series 3: 6 editions from 6 January 1993 – 10 February 1993
