= Birthrights (TV series) =

Birthrights was a BBC2 TV series 1991–1993 about UK politics, society, and race relations from a black and Asian perspective.

== Selected episodes ==
- The 12 June 1991 episode talked to Asian and black candidates for parliament about their prospects in the coming general election, and interviewed MPs Bernie Grant and Keith Vaz on four years in parliament.
