= Toby Hull =

British entertainer

Toby Hull is a British actor and television writer. He is the son of Rod Hull, a television entertainer who performed with an arm-length puppet known as Emu.

After the death of his father in 1999, Hull brought Emu out of retirement for the 2003 pantomime season, appearing in Cinderella at the Theatre Royal, Windsor. In 2007 Hull appeared with a refurbished Emu in their own series on CITV.

Hull is a lead writer for Hasbro Entertainment, working on episodes of My Little Pony: Tell Your Tale.
