= Bitsa =

- Genre: Art, Children's, Craft
- Created by: Paul Goddard
- Developed by: Paul Goddard
- Starring: Caitlin Easterby; Simon Pascoe
- Country of origin: United Kingdom
- Original language: English
- No. of episodes: 77

Production
- Running time: 15 mins

Original release
- Network: BBC One
- Release: 8 January 1991 – 20 March 1996

Bitsa is a British television programme broadcast from 1991 to 1996 on the Children's BBC strand on BBC1. It involved creative arts and "makes" very much like later show SMart. It was repeated for a time on the now defunct digital channel BBC Choice.

The show featured two presenters, artists Caitlin Easterby and Simon Pascoe, who would create craft projects from household junk and craft materials. Sometimes the items created were quite complex and advanced, but were always presented with instructions for viewers to follow. The show also featured a 'challenge' section, in which school children would shout three numbers corresponding to a selection of numbered boxes, each containing a different material, for example cardboard tubes, sticks or fabric. The presenters would then have three minutes to create something using only these materials. Much fervent use of a glue gun often ensued.

The theme tune for Bitsa was written by Peter Charlton and the original musical arrangement was by Bill Le Sage, but after the first series the tune was reworked by Mark Reader from the rock band Strider. Reader also wrote the music for the 3-minute challenge and composed all the rest of the music for the show.

Other items featured on the show included clips of children presenting craft projects they had made themselves, and footage of the presenters travelling around the country in their van visiting local schools. There was also a robotic puppet (made from glued together craft materials) named 'Hands' who would quickly make a small item, often mechanical in nature, from small items such as pieces of card, elastic bands or matchboxes, who would hum as he worked, then present the completed item with a flourish.

As the series progressed, Pascoe and Easterby became increasingly involved in devising and writing the programmes and developed, together with director Brian Jamieson, the more complex and surreal narratives of the later series. Half the programmes included an off-the-wall episode featuring guest artists, many of whom have become significant players in their fields.

Bitsa was initially devised and written by Peter Charlton and Paul Goddard, who himself operated the character of Hands. He later went on to work on other BBC children's shows, including the Fimbles. Easterby and Pascoe have continued to run their own left-field arts company. Two books have been produced to accompany the series. Brian Jamieson directed most of the programmes, though the last series was directed by Will Brenton, better known as co-producer of Tweenies.
