= The Power and the Glory (TV series) =

1991 British television documentary series

- Genre: Documentary, Motoring
- Directed by: John Bird; Michael Schooley
- Presented by: Philip Tibenham
- Country of origin: United Kingdom
- Original language: English
- No. of series: 1
- No. of episodes: 13

Production
- Executive producer: Ivan Rendall
- Producer: John Gau Productions
- Running time: 380 minutes
- Production company: BBC Enterprises Ltd

Original release
- Network: BBC2
- Release: 4 October – 27 December 1991

The Power and the Glory was a 13-part television documentary series shown between 4 October and 27 December 1991 on BBC2. The series covers 100 years of motor racing history.

The series was released on VHS in 1992 in the UK as a set of two tapes. It was released in the US by Columbia House as a set of thirteen tapes.

== Episode list ==
No.	Title	Synopsis	Airdate
1	The Fastest Men on Earth	The first Grand Prix was won 85 years ago at 73 mph. This year's Indianapolis winner averaged 176 mph.	4 October 1991
2	The Road Racers	Millie Miglia, Targa Florio, Carrera Pan Americana - the names of the great road races have disappeared from the racing calendar, but they still evoke the history of motor racing at its most full-blooded. But as the power and speed of cars rose, so did the death toll of drivers and spectators. The sport was banned in the 1950s. Today's alternatives include racing in the Mexican deserts.	11 October 1991
3	The Right Stuff	What makes a champion racing driver? Some of the sport's great names, including Nigel Mansell and Stirling Moss offer an insight into what took them to victory. And at a school for racing drivers, students find out if they have that combination of skill, courage, toughness, and the will to win.	18 October 1991
4	The Pioneers	This is the story of the remarkable men whose daring and skill pushed the top speed of racing cars from around 20 mph to over lOO mph in the pioneering age of the sport.	25 October 1991
5	The Aristocrats	The 20s and early 30s saw the expansion of grand-prix racing and the introduction of technical advances like supercharging and the first single-seaters. The designers produced some of the classic cars of all time - Bentley, Bugatti, Alfa Romeo.	1 November 1991
6	Years of Thunder	From zero to 300 mph in six seconds, nose-to-tail racing at 200 mph, ear-splitting exhausts, gigantic crowds - this is motor racing the American way. Both drag racing and stock-car racing started illegally on the streets of America and have become part of the country's popular culture. Today they are multi-million-dollar businesses. The stars of these sports explain how it happened.	8 November 1991
7	Racing for the Reich	Hitler knew that victory on the grand prix circuits would demonstrate the Third Reich's technical superiority and bring his new Germany great prestige. So with government subsidies, both Mercedes-Benz and Auto Union set out to build a winning car, and the swastika became a familiar feature on the racetracks of the 30s.	15 November 1991
8	Forests Deep, Mountains High	Rallying began as a genteel amateur sport for those with a sense of adventure - today it is highly competitive, with special cars, large back-up teams and professional drivers.	22 November 1991
9	Those Red Cars	The story of the brilliant red cars of Italy - so elegant to look at, so easy to drive - which dominated grand-prix racing after the Second World War, featuring, in particular, the great classic of its time, the Maserati 250F.	29 November 1991
10	The Revolutionaries	In 1958, a little Cooper Climax, driven by Stirling Moss, won the Argentinian Grand Prix. It was the first time in the modern era that a mid-engined car had won a grand prix. The front-engined racing car was soon consigned to history. This is the story of the men behind this very British revolution, which started in a family garage business in Surrey.	6 December 1991
11	Making a Marque	Ferrari, Porsche and Jaguar all made their reputations by winning on the racetrack. In the 1930s, MG were among the first to build a road car which could be raced. Jaguar's string of successes in the 1950s at Le Mans helped sell their sports cars all over the world. Using specially-shot footage, Making a Marque looks at some of the world's most beautiful sports cars which proved themselves first on the racetrack.	13 December 1991
12	The Richest Prize	To win the Indianapolis 500 is an American dream. The drivers share over $7 million for just one race. This year's winner, Rick Mears, has won the richest prize in motor sport four times. He describes what it is like to drive round the famous track at speeds approaching 240 mph. "You work all year to try and win this one," he says. The programme features some of the great races and spectacular crashes. With classic archive material, it evokes the most dangerous and exciting age of US motor racing, the Board Speedways of the 1920s. In these high-banked ovals, built of wooden planks, drivers of some of the earliest single-seaters, the Millers, risked all in pursuit of riches and the American National Championship.	20 December 1991
13	State of the Art	How Formula 1 was transformed into a multi-million pound global business. Featuring interviews with racing drivers Nigel Mansell, James Hunt and Gerhard Berger, and team bosses Ron Dennis, Frank Williams and Ken Tyrrell.	27 December 1991
