= The Holy Family Album =

TV documentary written by Angela Carter

The Holy Family Album is a television documentary written and narrated by Angela Carter. It was directed by Jo Ann Kaplan and produced by John Ellis at Large Door Productions, London, UK. It was broadcast on the UK's Channel 4 on 3 December 1991 as part of the Without Walls series, commissioned by Waldemar Januszczak.

The documentary treats representations of Christ in Western art as if they are photographs in God's photo album. According to John Ellis, the programme "caused considerable controversy", and was criticised in an editorial in The Times even before it was transmitted. The programme was featured in Channel 4's review programme Right to Reply and a complaint to the Broadcasting Standards Commission was not upheld. It has not been retransmitted or published since Angela Carter's death in 1992.
