= Mystery Train (disambiguation) =

"Mystery Train" is a 1953 song by Junior Parker, first covered by Elvis Presley, then numerous others.

Mystery Train may also refer to:

== Music ==
- Mystery Train (book), a 1975 book about rock 'n' roll, by Greil Marcus
- Mystery Train, blues musician Willie D. Warren's backing band
- "Mystery Train", a song by Bon Jovi song from Crush
- "Mystery Train", Everybody's Rockin- Neil Young & The Shocking Pinks- released 1983

== Film, television and radio ==
- The Mystery Train (film), a 1931 American film by Phil Whitman
- Mystery Train (film), a 1989 American film by Jim Jarmusch
- "Mystery Train" (Adventure Time), an episode of the TV series Adventure Time
- Mystery Train, an Irish radio program on RTÉ, presented by John Kelly
- Mystery Train, a BBC2 series from 1991 hosted by Richard O'Brien

== Other uses ==
- Mystery Train (Nancy Drew/Hardy Boys), a Nancy Drew and Hardy Boys mystery novel
