= Radio Roo =

- Written by: Wayne Jackman
- Directed by: Rod Litherland (lighting); Christine Hewitt
- Starring: Wayne Jackman; Ian Tregonning; Caroline O'Connor; Megg Nichol
- Music by: Peter Gosling (director)
- Country of origin: United Kingdom
- No. of episodes: 31

Production
- Producer: Christine Hewitt
- Editor: Paul Hagan
- Running time: 30 min.

Original release
- Network: BBC
- Release: 25 February 1991 – 29 March 1993

Radio Roo is a British children's television programme which features the adventures of Dennis and Clive, who run a radio station, Radio Roo, based in England that Clive inherited. The show ran for a total of 31 episodes from 25 February 1991 to 29 March 1993 on the BBC. All episodes were written by Wayne Jackman, who starred as Dennis. The broad Australian accent of Clive the Kangaroo was provided by Ian Tregonning.

The Dennis and Clive characters had previously hosted the CBBC Saturday morning strand on BBC One under the title Saturday Starts Here from October 1989, with the concept that Dennis was a BBC trainee tasked with setting up the tapes of the shows preceding Going Live!, with Clive's attempts at assisting him going awry.
