= Jumble (British game show) =

- Genre: Game show
- Created by: Bill Hillier; Ronnie Greenberg
- Presented by: Jeff Stevenson
- Country of origin: United Kingdom
- Original language: English
- No. of series: 2
- No. of episodes: 56

Production
- Running time: 30 minutes (inc. adverts)
- Production company: Anglia

Original release
- Network: ITV
- Release: 12 March 1991 – 4 September 1992

Jumble is a British game show that aired on ITV from 12 March 1991 to 4 September 1992 and is hosted by Jeff Stevenson.

== Gameplay ==
The game was played with two contestants each with a celebrity partner.

To start, a cartoon puzzle was revealed, along with its caption. Each puzzle had four words associated with it. The team in control decided amongst themselves, who will be the "yeller" and who will be the "speller". The yeller must unscramble a word within 15 seconds. The speller's job is to rearrange magnetic letters but cannot spell a word until the yeller correctly says it. A correct guess awards some money. If the team in control can't solve it, the opposing team is allowed to try. If both teams fail, the host places letters one at a time until one team gets it.

The letters appearing in the red spaces, like the circled letters in the newspaper version, are then brought over to the cartoon puzzle. They have a few seconds to guess the punny phrase. If they don't solve it, another word was played. But if they do solve it, the contestant wins bonus money.

Four puzzles were played, the first two were worth £25 and £10/word and the last two were worth £50 and £20/word. The team with the most money at the end of the game, goes to the bonus round for another £200.

In the bonus game, one final cartoon was revealed. This last puzzle had six jumbled words that relate directly to the cartoon. The winning team had 60 seconds to unscrambled & guess as many of those six words as they can. For each word correctly guessed, its key letters moved over to the cartoon. When the time was up or if all six words were guessed correctly, the team was given another 10 seconds to think of a solution and then, solve the puzzle. Solving the puzzle awarded another £200.

== Transmissions ==
Series	Start date	End date	Episodes
1	12 March 1991	26 April 1991	26
2	27 July 1992	4 September 1992	30
