= Carol Lee Scott =

British entertainer (1942–2017)

- Born: Carol Waterman; 20 December 1942; Bridgwater, Somerset, England
- Died: 4 July 2017 (aged 74)
- Occupations: Performer, vocalist
- Notable work: Grotbags
- Website: https://web.archive.org/web/20091218081039/http://www.grotbags.net/

Carol Lee Scott (20 December 1942 – 4 July 2017) was an English entertainer, best known for her role on British television in the 1980s and 1990s as "Grotbags". Throughout her career, Scott regularly performed on the international cabaret circuit, and prior to her TV work, she was a singer and released two albums.

== Early career ==
Born in Bridgwater, Somerset as Carol Waterman, she began her career after moving to London singing in local pubs, all while working day shifts at the record department at Rumbelows.

She gained her break as a performer when she joined Pontins, ultimately working there for 19 years, playing at all of the UK holiday camps, along with those in Scandinavia, Spain, and elsewhere. During the off-season, Scott played many of the northern England and Scotland working men's clubs, sharing a bill with stars including The Four Tops, Morecambe and Wise and Tommy Cooper.

During this time, she recorded an album in 1974 which she originally sold only at her concerts.

== Grotbags ==
The concept of Grotbags came about while Scott was performing in summer season in Cleethorpes with Rod Hull. When Hull was approached to make a new show to be broadcast at the launch of Central Independent Television, he created the series Emu's World, and approached Scott to play the witch. Together they came up with the premise of Grotbags' character and name (the latter coming with Scott suggesting 'Miss Grot', the name the MD of Ladbrokes used to call her; Hull revised it to Grotbags).

Grotbags first appeared on Emu's World in January 1982, and starred alongside various companions including cowardly crocodile Croc, mechanical butler Robot Redford, and fawning manservant Grovel. All of which, at one point were played by Freddie Stevens. In many episodes, Scott would be given a song to sing. In 1991, she was the voice of Grotbags in the cartoon series, Rod 'n' Emu. She was also given her own spin off series, Grotbags – which ran for 29 episodes across three series.

== Death ==
Scott died from cancer on 4 July 2017, at the age of 74.

== Filmography ==
=== Television ===
- Emu's World 1982–1989
- Bullseye (Special Guest) 1984
- Rod 'n' Emu 1991
- Grotbags 1991–1993
- Rod Hull: A Bird in the Hand 2003

== Discography ==
=== Albums ===
- Carol Scott & Friends At The Valley Club Charlton (1971)
- In Time (1974)
- Your Place Is Here with Me (1976)

=== Single ===
- "Little Bit of Love" / "You Gotta Believe" (1974)
