= Jeff Stevenson (comedian) =

British comedian

- Born: Jeffrey Stevens; 3 March 1961 (age 65); Hammersmith, London, England
- Occupations: Comedian, actor
- Years active: 1975–present
- Television: Jumble
- Height: 1.73 m (5 ft 8 in)
- Awards: Best Feature Actor (2020)
- Website: https://jeffstevenson.show/

Jeff Stevenson (born Jeffrey Stevens; 3 March 1961, Hammersmith, England) is an English comedian and actor. Stevenson's career first began when he appeared in the 1976 film Bugsy Malone, playing the part of Fat Sam's hoodlum Louis.

== Career ==
Stevenson was born in 1961 in Hammersmith, London. He attended Barbara Speake Stage School in his teens and Phil Collins' mother, June, was his first agent. Stevenson's first film role was a Louis in Bugsy Malone in 1976.

He later played the Stag comedian at Rodney Trotter's stag night on Only Fools and Horses, and also played PC Parker in To Hull and Back, a Christmas Day film of Only Fools and Horses. He regularly performed the role of "warm up' act for studio recordings of Only Fools and Horses.

Stevenson hosted the ITV series Knees Up, a variety show set in a London pub that was a follow on from the first series hosted by Chas & Dave. Stevenson also hosted the ITV daytime game show Jumble which ran for two series in 1991 and 1992.

Jeff was a supporting act for singer Johnny Mathis during his 2015 UK tour. Stevenson starred in the 2020 Joe Wenbourne film Touching the Blue. The film won worldwide accolades, including an award for Stevenson for best feature actor in the Los Angeles World Premiere Film Awards.

== Filmography ==
Year	Title	Role	Notes
1976	Ripping Yarns	Student	One episode
1976	Bugsy Malone	Louis	Film
1977	The Boys and Mrs B	Tiny	Film
1979	Citizen Smith	Trooper	One episode
1979	Search for a Star	Himself	One episode
1981—1984	Punchlines	Himself	Five episodes
1983—1984	Knees-Up	Himself	Two episodes
1983	The Freddie Starr Showcase	Himself	One episode
1983	The Entertainers	Himself	One episode
1984—1990	Blankety Blank	Himself	Four episodes
1984—1986	Live from Her Majesty's	Himself	Two episodes
1984	Royal Variety Performance	Himself	One episode
1984	3-2-1	Himself	One episode
1985—1989	Only Fools and Horses	Comedian (1985) PC Parker (1989)	Two episodes
1985	The Laughter Show	Himself	One episode
1985	The Keith Harris Show	Himself	One episode
1985	The Des O'Connor Show	Himself	One episode
1986—1987	Tom O'Connor	Himself	Seven episodes
1986	Laugh Attack	Himself	One episode
1987	The Les Dennis Laughter Show	Himself	One episode
1987	Seaside Special 87	Himself	One episode
1989	Sob Sisters	Restaurant waiter	One episode
1989	Saturday Night Out	Himself	One episode
1991—1992	Jumble	Himself	Four episodes
1992	Win, Lose or Draw	Himself	Five episodes
1992	The Comedians	Himself	One episode
1994—1996	Pebble Mill at One	Himself	Two episodes
1994	Men of the World	Compere	One episode
1997	Talking Telephone Numbers	Himself	One episode
2002	The Real...	Himself	One episode
2002	The Basil Brush Show	Inland revenue man	One episode
2003	After They Were Famous	Himself	One episode
2007	EastEnders	Delivery man	One episode
2017	Jack in the Box	Himself	Film
2020	Touching the Blue	Derek Hodges	Film
2021	Behind the Scenes with Colin Edmonds	Himself	One episode
