= Pavarotti in the Park =

1991 concert in London

Pavarotti in the Park was a concert held on 30 July 1991 featuring the Italian opera singer Luciano Pavarotti with the Philharmonia Orchestra and Philharmonia Chorus under conductor Leone Magiera in London's Hyde Park. The concert was attended by an estimated audience of 150,000.

== Background ==
The concert was held to mark the 30th anniversary of the start of Pavarotti's operatic career and to raise funds for the Royal Parks Tree Appeal under the patronage of Charles, Prince of Wales to replace trees in the park that were felled in a recent storm. Pavarotti himself planted a tree near the stage before the concert. The concert site was set over 50 acres. The concert was organised by the music promoter Harvey Goldsmith.

The concert stage set was designed to resemble a classical Greek theatre with large columns either side of the stage. Three large screens around the park displayed the concert to spectators. The concert cost an estimated $1.5 million to stage. A merchandising stall at the concert sold 1,000 Pavarotti t-shirts.

== Concert ==
Members of the audience included Charles and his wife Diana, Princess of Wales, Sarah, Duchess of York, Prime Minister John Major and his wife, Norma, the composer Andrew Lloyd Webber and the actor Michael Caine. 3,500 attendees paid between £150 and £300 for seats in hospitality boxes which included dinner at a nearby luxury hotel with champagne and canapes. Pavarotti did not perform the concert for free, his fee was £1million plus expenses. The concert was broadcast live by British Sky Broadcasting and to more than 30 countries.

Pavarotti performed 20 arias at the concert by composers including Georges Bizet, Giacomo Puccini, Giuseppe Verdi, and Richard Wagner. Pavarotti dedicated the aria "Donna non vidi mai" from Puccini's opera Manon Lescaut to Princess Diana and translated its title as "I have never seen a woman like that".

Reviewing the concert for The Guardian, the critic Nicholas de Jongh wrote that there had not been "such a brouhaha for a free concert" since the concert given by The Rolling Stones in 1969. De Jongh felt the Greek theatre setting was "hideous" but "Hero worship was the mood of the evening and sang-froid the style.". De Jongh wrote that "Pavarotti offered not all that much to set the pulse racing. He stood in his full evening dress, a bearded figure, plump to the point of portliness, clutching a huge handkerchief in one hand as if it were a prop and keeping the other almost entirely still. His voice alone did all the remarkable acting".

=== Set list ===
1. Overture from Les vêpres siciliennes by Giuseppe Verdi
2. "O paradiso" from L'Africaine by Giacomo Meyerbeer
3. "La mia letizia infondere" from I Lombardi alla prima crociata by Giuseppe Verdi
4. "Quando le sere al placido" from Luisa Miller by Giuseppe Verdi
5. "Pourquoi me réveiller?" from Werther by Jules Massenet
6. "Recondita armonia" from Tosca by Giacomo Puccini
7. "E lucevan le stelle" from Tosca by Giacomo Puccini
8. "Vesti la giubba" from Pagliacci by Ruggero Leoncavallo
9. "Mamma" by Cesare Andrea Bixio
10. "La mia canzone al vento" by Cesare Andrea Bixio
11. "Non ti scordar di me" by Ernesto De Curtis
12. "O Sole Mio" by Eduardo di Capua
13. "Torna a Surriento" by Ernesto de Curtis
14. "Tra voi, belle" from Manon Lescaut by Puccini
15. "Donna non vidi mai" from Manon Lescaut by Giacomo Puccini
16. "Nessun dorma" from Turandot by Giacomo Puccini
- From the Pavarotti in Hyde Park CD track listing

=== Wet weather ===
The concert was marked by constant rain, which ceased only for a few minutes. 193 people were treated by the St John Ambulance as a result of the cold weather. Tension arose in the large crowd due to spectators who had umbrellas blocking the view for those without, with soft drink cans and plastic bottles being thrown at those holding umbrellas. The promoter of the concert, Harvey Goldsmith, urged the crowd to lower their umbrellas so that people could see the stage better. Princess Diana was one of the first to lower her umbrella and her gesture encouraged the rest of the crowd to do likewise. Pavarotti recalled in his autobiography that after the concert Diana was "...soaked, totally soaked, her blond hair streaming down on both sides of her face. Even so, she still looked beautiful and like a princess". Diana wore a double breasted blue suit by the Irish designer Paul Costelloe at the concert.
