= Rod Hull =

English comedian (1935–1999)

- Hull with his puppet sidekick, Emu
- Born: Rodney Stephen Hull; 13 August 1935; Isle of Sheppey, Kent, England
- Died: 17 March 1999 (aged 63); Winchelsea, East Sussex, England
- Occupations: Entertainer, comedian
- Years active: 1956–1999
- Notable work: Emu
- Children: 6, including Toby

Rodney Stephen Hull (13 August 1935 – 17 March 1999) was an English comedian and popular entertainer on television in the 1970s and 1980s. He rarely appeared without Emu, a mute and curious arm-length puppet modelled on the Australian bird.

== Early life ==
Hull was born on the Isle of Sheppey, Kent, England in 1935. He attended Delamark Road School and the County Technical School, Sheerness. After national service with the Royal Air Force, he qualified as an electrician.

== TV career ==
=== Australia ===
Hull moved to Australia in 1956. His first job in television was as a lighting technician with TCN Channel 9 in Sydney. He then began appearing on air, including as Constable Clot in Channel 9's Kaper Kops with Reg Gorman and Desmond Tester, a regular segment in its children's afternoon programming. Clot proved popular and soon gained his own segment, Clot in the Clouds, which depicted him daydreaming about having other professions, such as a world-famous brain surgeon, 'Blood Clot.'

Later he worked with Marilyn Mayo as co-host of a children's breakfast TV programme, The Super Flying Fun Show, playing a wacky character named 'Caretaker Clot,' an extension of his Kaper Cops role. Hull first used Emu as a puppet in this show. There are conflicting reports as to how this came about. The 2003 Channel 4 documentary Rod Hull: A Bird in the Hand states that "In fact, Emu was a Channel Nine creation". Other sources cite a Channel Nine producer, Jim Badger, who said that he had requested a reluctant Hull to use Emu. Hull claimed full authorship of Emu, saying, "Sure I found him in a cupboard, but I had put him there in the first place. I concocted him, nobody else." The bird subsequently became a regular part of Hull's set on cabarets back in the United Kingdom and Australia.

=== Britain ===
Hull returned to the UK in 1971 and signed with International Artists. Soon after, his Australian success translated to his native country with Hull appearing on several children's and adult light entertainment shows.

His first UK television appearance came on the ITV show Saturday Variety, but it was his appearance in the 1972 Royal Variety Performance that provided his springboard to national recognition.

== Emu ==
Hull used Emu to create havoc while not accepting responsibility for it. The use of a false arm attached to Hull's jacket, which cradled the emu, made it appear that the neck and head moved of its own volition. Hull used the puppet to make violent attacks on people nearby. During these events Hull would make half-hearted attempts to pull the bird away from its victim but would often become embroiled in the fracas, rolling around on the floor, creating theatrical mayhem and a lot of slapstick.

When Hull left The Super Flying Fun Show and Australia, a duplicate of Emu was made so the character could continue on the show, much to Hull's annoyance, and comedian Marty Morton took over Hull's co-hosting position in Australia.

Hull and Emu were regulars on The Hudson Brothers Razzle Dazzle Show, which aired for one season as a Saturday morning children's show on American broadcaster CBS in 1974–1975.

At least two people have alleged that Hull sexually assaulted women using Emu as a cover. Darts champion Eric Bristow wrote: "He used the puppet to feel up women and stick his hand between people's legs." In a 2017 interview with Chortle, comedy producer Michael Hurll recalled saying to Hull, "Look Rod, you've got your hand in that emu, up girls' skirts and squeezing their tits; doing things you would get locked up for." Hurll reported similar assaults on men in a Channel 4 documentary, Rod Hull: A Bird in the Hand (2003).

In 1972, Hull destroyed The Queen Mother's bouquet of flowers during the after-show line-up at the Royal Variety Performance. During 1976, Hull's Emu repeatedly attacked Michael Parkinson during his chat show, eventually causing Parkinson to fall off his chair. Fellow guest Billy Connolly threatened, "If that bird comes anywhere near me, I'll break its neck and your bloody arm!" In later years, Parkinson later referred to Emu as "that bloody bird."

He later starred in the television series Emu's Broadcasting Company (1975–1980), Emu's World, EMU TV and Emu's All Live Pink Windmill Show, taking his television career up to 1991.

In 1983 he appeared in the US on The Tonight Show, attacking host Johnny Carson, even after he was asked not to by the producers, and Richard Pryor in one of his first public appearances after undergoing major emergency reconstructive surgery on his face.

== Later life ==
By the 1990s, Hull was seen less frequently on TV, although he continued to appear in pantomime and television commercials, made personal appearances and occasional TV appearances. Comedians Richard Herring and Stewart Lee included a "not Rod Hull" character in their 1996 television sketch show Fist of Fun, played by Kevin Eldon. This character was performed as a grotesque imitation of Hull and was finally unmasked by the real Rod Hull who appeared in the last episode of the series. It was to be Hull's penultimate television appearance.

A 2003 Channel 4 documentary, Rod Hull: A Bird in the Hand, suggested that Hull nursed an increasing resentment towards his puppet, believing that the success of the bird prevented him from pursuing other avenues in show business. He saw himself, according to the makers of the programme, as a talented performer who could have developed a more varied career in the entertainment industry had he not been repeatedly forced to perform with the Emu. Hull once complained, "I want to write but Emu doesn't leave me the time. I want to be a comedian in my own right, but again Emu won't let me do it."

== Personal life ==
Hull married his first wife Sandra Carter in 1958; they had two daughters, Deborah and Danielle. Hull's second wife, Cher Hylton-Hull, who he married in 1978, already had a daughter, Catrina, and the couple had three children together: Toby, Amelia, and Oliver. Catrina appeared in his Pink Windmill show.

He was a fan of the football club Bristol Rovers, and he recorded a song called "Bristol Rovers All the Way" in 1974, with the squad of that time.

In 1986 Hull bought Restoration House in Rochester for £270,000, but the cost of renovations and an unpaid tax bill, caused by his accountant not paying his tax properly over the previous 20 years and the recession and property slump, resulted in Hull leaving the property in October 1993 and filing bankruptcy in September 1994. His production company Hibou Productions went bust with debts of £38,500. Hylton-Hull, who had been instrumental in his success, moved back to her home country of Australia with their children, while Hull remained in England and relocated to a shepherd's cottage in East Sussex.

== Death ==
On the night of 17 March 1999, Hull was trying to adjust the television aerial on the roof of his bungalow at half-time during an Inter Milan vs. Manchester United Champions League match, when he slipped and fell. He suffered a severe skull fracture and chest injuries, and was pronounced dead on arrival at hospital in Hastings. Following an inquest, the coroner recorded a verdict of accidental death.

== Legacy ==
Prior to Hull's death, Lee and Herring had planned to revive their "not Rod Hull" character for their contemporary series, This Morning with Richard Not Judy, but although they filmed several sketches – in which the character would die after performing a pointless stunt – the footage was never used. Instead, the final episode of the second and final series of This Morning with Richard Not Judy concluded with a post-credits sketch featuring Kevin Eldon's Rod Hull character, fading out to a simple dedication reading "This series is dedicated to Rod Hull."

Hull and Emu were also the subject of the song "No One Knew the Real Emu" by The Toy Dolls (2004).

Upon Hull's death, Michael Parkinson reminisced that he had found him to be "a very charming, intelligent, and sensitive man – quite unlike the Emu." He observed that the puppet "was the dark side of Rod's personality, and very funny, provided it was not on top of you."

His son Toby brought Emu out of retirement for the first time since his father's death during the 2003 pantomime season, appearing in Cinderella at the Theatre Royal, Windsor. Toby Hull and Emu later appeared in their own series on CITV.

In June 2018, puppeteer Phil Fletcher bought one of the last remaining Emu puppets for £8,860 at Chippenham Auction Rooms in Wiltshire.

== See also ==
- Bernie Clifton, contemporary comedian with ostrich puppet based comedy routine
- Super Flying Fun Show, Australian children's television show where Hull first performed with Emu
- Arthur! and the Square Knights of the Round Table, Australian series for which Hull was a writer
