= Eric Campbell (political activist) =

Solicitor and New Guard leader (1893–1970)

Eric Campbell DSO VD
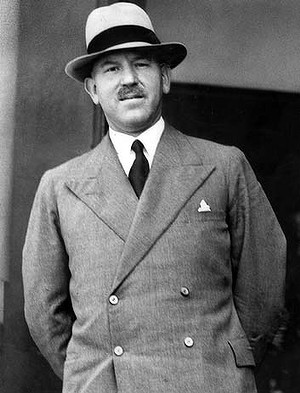
- A photograph of Campbell in 1932

Leader of the Centre Party
- In office 4 December 1933 – c. 1935
- Preceded by: Position established
- Succeeded by: Position abolished

Chief Commander of the New Guard
- In office 18 February 1931 – c. 1935
- Deputy: Sir George Hodges Knox; W. R. Cox
- Preceded by: Position established
- Succeeded by: Position abolished

Personal details
- Born: 11 April 1893 Young, New South Wales, Australia
- Died: 2 September 1970 (aged 77) Canberra, ACT, Australia
- Cause of death: Cancer
- Party: Centre Party
- Other political affiliations: New Guard
- Spouse: Nancy Emma Browne (m. 1924; died 1970)
- Occupation: Army Officer; Solicitor; Politician
- Awards: Distinguished Service Order; Colonial Auxiliary Forces Officers' Decoration

Military service
- Allegiance: Australia
- Branch/service: Australian Army
- Years of service: 1914–1932
- Rank: Lieutenant Colonel
- Unit: First Australian Imperial Force
- Battles/wars: World War I; Second Battle of the Somme

Eric Campbell, DSO, VD (11 April 1893 – 2 September 1970) was an Australian army officer and later a solicitor who was the leader of the far-right organisation, the New Guard in New South Wales.

Campbell had a distinguished career during World War I, serving as a major in artillery batteries on the Western Front. In Sydney in 1919 Campbell was admitted as a solicitor. He remained attached to the militia for about six years after returning from the war. In 1925 Campbell and another ex-A.I.F. officer organised a group of about five hundred men to provide extra-official support to the federal government to control anticipated unionist protests, in support of the government's efforts to deport two union leaders.

Campbell established a successful practice as a solicitor in Sydney. After the onset of the Great Depression and the election of the Labor government of Jack Lang in New South Wales he became involved with a clandestine ultra-conservative movement (later known as the Old Guard). In February 1931 Campbell formed a militant breakaway organisation called the New Guard, which actively opposed the Lang government, the Communist party and left-wing unions. The New Guard reached a peak membership of about sixty thousand by 1932, assisted by military-style recruiting methods and locally based units and organisers, co-ordinated by a centralised command structure. From January to August 1933 Campbell toured Europe, establishing contacts with British, German and Italian fascist groups. After returning to Australia he introduced fascist salutes and ceremonial trappings to New Guard meetings. These changes and Campbell's public expressions of admiration for Hitler and Mussolini, coincided with a rapid decrease in membership of the New Guard during 1933 (a process that had commenced after Lang's dismissal in May 1932).

As the membership of the New Guard declined, Campbell shifted focus to politics by the end of 1933, forming the Centre Party, a political party with the ambition to destroy the party system. The party failed to make any headway at the 1935 election in New South Wales and afterwards effectively ceased to exist. Campbell began to withdraw from public life and returned to his home town of Young in 1941. In 1945 he unsuccessfully sought selection as the Country Party candidate for the federal electorate of Hume.

Campbell's book The Rallying Point was published in 1965, detailing his version of the establishment of the New Guard. He died in Canberra in 1970.

== Biography ==
=== Early life ===
Eric Campbell was born on 11 April 1893 at Young, in the South Western Slopes region of New South Wales, the youngest child of Allan Campbell and Florence (née Russell). His father was a local solicitor. Eric had three older brothers. He was educated privately after which Campbell worked as an articled law clerk in his father's office.

Campbell was a sergeant in the New South Wales Senior Cadets. He travelled to England as a member of the New South Wales Coronation Cadet Contingent to march in the coronation parade of George V and his wife Mary in June 1911. During their time in England the contingent was inspected by the king. In a letter referring to the inspection, published in Sydney's Evening News, Campbell wrote: "He asked me several questions when inspecting, I being the only cadet he addressed in the contingent".

From late in 1913 Campbell served in the volunteer Australian Field Artillery. In January 1914 he was provisionally appointed as a lieutenant in the Field Artillery.

=== War service ===
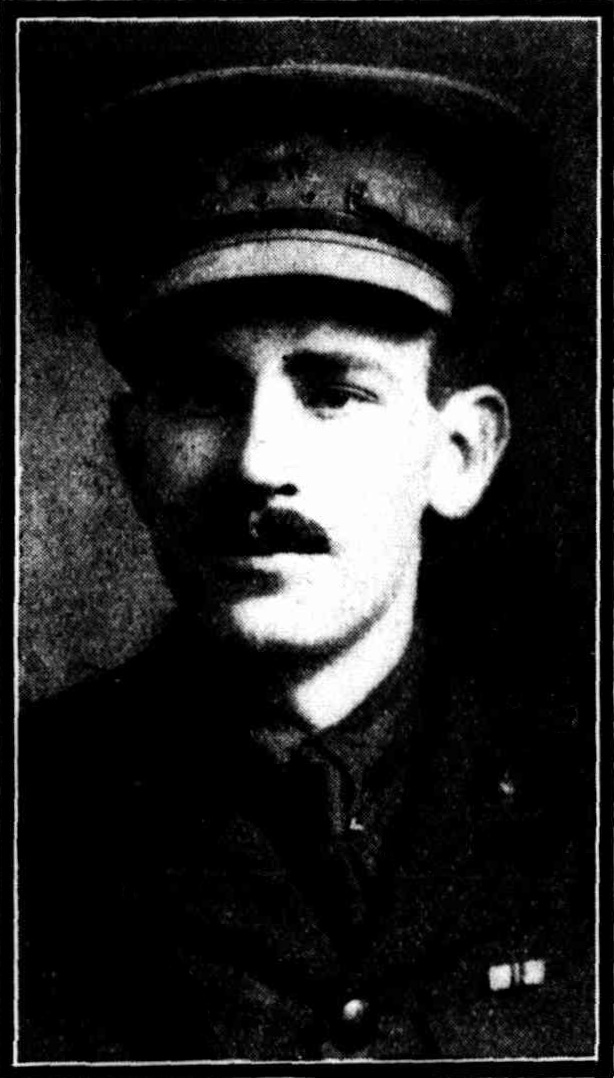
Major Eric Campbell (September 1917).

Eric Campbell enlisted in the Australian Imperial Force (A.I.F.) at Young on 1 April 1916 and was placed in the 27th Battery of the 7th Field Artillery Brigade. He was immediately promoted to captain in recognition of his service in the volunteer Field Artillery. In May he departed from Sydney aboard the troopship HMAT Argyllshire. On 29 December 1916 Campbell crossed from England to France to join the fighting on the Western Front. In July 1917 he was transferred to the 12th Australian (Army) Field Artillery Brigade; he was promoted to major and placed in charge of the 46th Battery. In November 1917 Campbell suffered from gas poisoning and was transferred to a hospital in London. He was discharged the following January and returned to the front line in February 1918.

In April 1918 Campbell was gassed for the second time at Robecq in northern France, but remained on duty. His battery was involved in fighting at Strazeele during June and the Somme from early August until the cessation of hostilities in November 1918.

Campbell was awarded the Distinguished Service Order on 31 December 1918. In late February 1919 he left England for Australia aboard the S.S. Anchises, arriving in Sydney on 18 April 1919. Campbell was discharged from the A.I.F. in June 1919.

=== Post-war ===
In Sydney Campbell completed his legal studies and was admitted as a solicitor on 29 August 1919. From 1920 to August 1926 he worked as a solicitor in a partnership with Septimus G. Rowe, with offices in Pitt Street, Sydney. Campbell maintained a connection with the military during this period, as a major in the militia commanding the 9th Field Artillery Brigade at the Holsworthy Base in south-west Sydney.

On 27 May 1924 the Labor Daily newspaper published an article about a young man named Harold Wallace who died of pneumonia at Sydney Hospital on 19 May. Nine weeks before his death Wallace had been undergoing military training at Holsworthy camp where he was subjected to a punishment by being forcibly held beneath a cold shower in the middle of the night for thirty-five minutes. The father of the young man was pressing for an inquiry into the incident which, he claimed, contributed to his son's death. The article concluded with the statement: "In this particular case the commanding officers were Major Rickard and Campbell, and there was little doubt that they or the officers beneath them showed criminal neglect of duty". Two days after the article appeared Eric Campbell issued a writ out of the New South Wales Supreme Court for three thousand pounds damages against the newspaper. In October 1924 an apology was published in the Labor Daily explaining that Majors Rickard and Campbell were not in camp when "the incident was alleged to have taken place", nor was the trainee in any unit commanded by either of the officers.

On 22 October 1924 Campbell married Nancy Emma Browne at the bride's family home at 'Memagong' station near Young. The couple lived at 'Boongala', a grand Federation house, located on Ku-ring-gai Avenue in the upper North Shore suburb of Turramurra. Eric and Nancy Campbell had five children born between 1925 and 1938 (including twin girls who died at birth in 1934).

By December 1924 Campbell had been promoted to the rank of lieutenant-colonel in the militia. In 1924 and 1925 Campbell served as a part-time General Service Officer (GSO) to Major-General Charles ('Digger') Brand, the District Commandant at Victoria Barracks.

Campbell had an active social life and was a member of a number of clubs, including the Imperial Service Club, with a membership of ex-military officers, and the exclusive Union Club. He was an avid golfer and was a member of Royal Sydney and Killara golf clubs. Campbell was a Freemason and a member of the Sydney Rotary Club.

=== X Force ===
During the post-war period the Australian Seamen's Union had developed a reputation for militancy in its efforts to achieve better working conditions. From January 1925 the union was engaged in a dispute with ship-owners over the right to select crews. A series of strikes ensued over the 'job control' issue, with the ship-owners making attempts to have the union deregistered through the Commonwealth Arbitration Court. A general seamen's strike in June and July caused considerable disruption, with many conservative politicians blaming communists and foreign agitators for the disturbances. Attention focussed on Tom Walsh and Jacob Johnson, the president and secretary of the Seamen's Union, both of whom were born overseas.

On 30 May 1925 the Labor Party, led by Jack Lang, gained power in New South Wales after a two-seat victory in the state general election. Lang became premier and treasurer in the new Labor government.

In July 1925 the federal government, a coalition of the Nationalist and Country parties led by Prime Minister Stanley Bruce, passed an amendment to the Immigration Act which included clauses that empowered the government, during a state of "serious industrial disturbance", to deport foreign-born labour organisers. With its sights set on Walsh and Johnson, the government anticipated large scale working-class demonstrations against their likely deportation. In August 1925 Bruce introduced legislation called the Peace Officers Act into federal parliament which authorised the government to appoint "peace officers", with the "powers, privileges and immunities" of police officers, for the purpose of "the preservation of the peace throughout the Commonwealth". In late August Walsh and Johnson were served with summonses to appear before the Deportation Board in Sydney. After the hearings were concluded, the board decided that the presence of the two union officials in Australia "will be injurious to the peace, order and good government of the Commonwealth". On 14 November 1925 Bruce's conservative coalition won a further term of office at the federal election, during the campaign of which the issue of industrial anarchy had predominated. Six days later, in the early hours of 20 November, Walsh and Johnson were arrested at their homes by the Federal police and taken to Garden Island.

During the incarceration of Walsh and Johnson on Garden Island, Campbell was visited by a fellow ex-A.I.F. officer named William John Scott.^{[A]} Campbell had first met 'Jack' Scott in early 1919 at a demobilisation camp in England and the two had become friends. Scott told Campbell that Prime Minister Bruce had requested that he organise a force of five hundred hand-picked "ex-A.I.F." men to assist the police in controlling any anticipated demonstrations by "militant unions" in support of Walsh and Johnson. Campbell agreed to help and, as he later claimed, "in a matter of days the job was completed in complete secrecy". A month earlier, during the election campaign, Sydney's The Labor Daily had published a document, "secured... from an unimpeachable source", which detailed "the sinister and discreditable tactics" of the government in organising a secret force which the newspaper compared to the Fascists in Italy. The article quoted details from the document that included instructions for the "necessity of secrecy". The names of "persons belonging to the force" were not to be disclosed and "any written instructions must be destroyed by means of burning". The document mentioned assembly locations called "X stations", where force members would gather (should the need arise), which led to subsequent references to the shadowy group as 'X Force'. One of the mooted rallying locations for X Force was Victoria Barracks, where Campbell was a part-time GSO to the commandant, Major-General Brand.

On 11 December 1925 the High Court ordered the release of the two unionists and declared the decision by the Deportation Board to be invalid. With the High Court ruling as it did, the anticipated unionist demonstrations were averted and X Force faded back into obscurity. The force assembled by Campbell and Scott had been a secret organisation reflecting the camaraderie of ex-servicemen from the officer class, ready to support and champion a conservative non-Labor federal government. It was Campbell's first involvement in paramilitary activities and served as a forerunner of his later efforts in that direction.

=== Legal practice ===
In August 1926 the partnership between Campbell and Septimus Rowe, practising solicitors at 'Rickard House' at 84 Pitt Street in Sydney, was dissolved "by mutual agreement". Eric Campbell carried on in a practice under the name of 'Campbell and Campbell', in partnership with his older brother Allan. The Campbell brothers occupied temporary offices at 'Rickard House'. In January 1930 a third brother, William Campbell of Orange, joined the partnership, which was renamed 'Campbell, Campbell and Campbell'. A fourth brother, Neil Campbell, was also associated with the legal practice as an accountant.

In July 1928 Campbell was the solicitor for the aviators, Charles Kingsford-Smith and Charles Ulm, in defending a legal claim by Keith Anderson for a share of the profits from the recent trans-Pacific flight undertaken by the two pilots, as well as a share in the Southern Cross aeroplane. Anderson was an airman who had travelled to America with Kingsford-Smith and Ulm to be part of the crew for the trans-Pacific flight. He had to return to Australia while preparations for the venture were underway, and was unable to travel back to participate in the flight. Anderson's suit was finally settled in February 1929, without any monetary claim being ordered.

=== The Old Guard ===
In October 1929 two events caused profound changes to economic, social and political conditions in Australia. At the federal election held on 12 October, the Australian Labor Party led by James Scullin was elected to government in a landslide, with the sitting prime minister, Stanley Bruce, losing his seat. Labor had successfully depicted Bruce as seeking to adversely affect the wages and working conditions of Australian workers with his efforts to dismantle the conciliation and arbitration system. By the end of October the crash of the New York Stock Exchange had occurred, causing a global economic crisis and subsequent onset of the Great Depression. By the following year with rising unemployment, Australian governments responded to the financial crisis with cuts to government spending, civil service salaries and public works cancellations. In New South Wales the opposition leader, Jack Lang, vigorously opposed these measures and was elected in a landslide in elections held in October 1930.

Campbell's personal political philosophy embraced the basic principles of individual freedom and a minimum of government interference. The re-election of Lang's government, with its strong support for the labour movement, was anathema to him. Campbell "looked with dismay on the aggressive paternalism of Mr. Lang's policy" and became convinced "that the implementation of the Lang Plan would create grave civil disturbance".

Late in 1930 Campbell took on the role of recruitment officer for 'the Movement' (later known as the Old Guard), a clandestine group founded by an elite group of ultra-conservative activist businessmen, ex-officers and graziers as a reaction to the Depression and fears about the left-wing agenda of Lang's Labor government in New South Wales. The principal organisers of 'the Movement' were the powerful business-figures, Philip Goldfinch and Robert Gillespie (first chairman of its central committee). The counter-revolutionary group was directed towards the preservation of the existing order and devotion to the British Empire, prepared to mobilise to maintain essential services and defend property rights in the event of serious disorder.

=== The New Guard ===
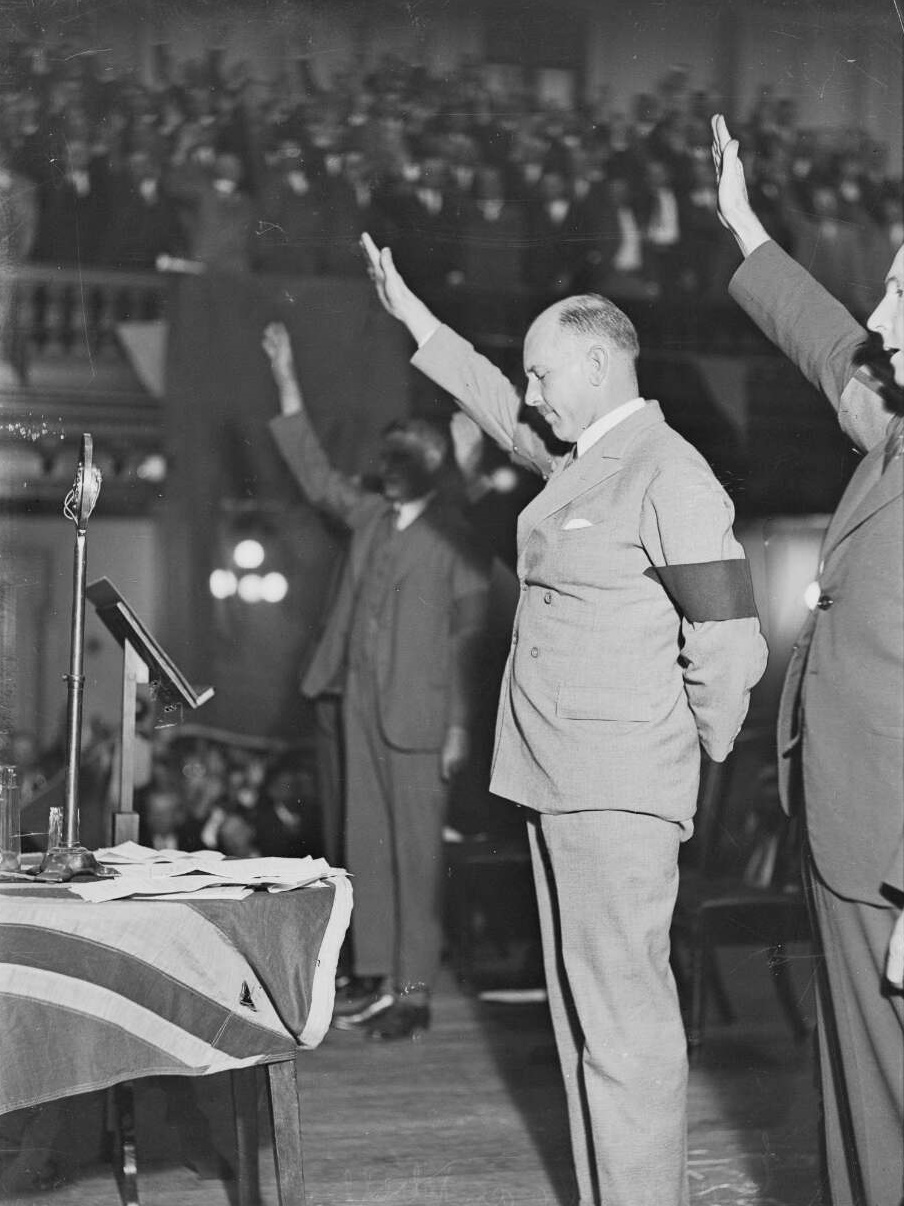
Leader of the New Guard, Colonel Eric Campbell, on stage; photographed on 17 December 1931.

==== Beginnings ====
Soon after its formation in late 1930, tensions emerged within the Old Guard regarding how secretive and combative the organisation should be. A group within the movement led by Eric Campbell advocated for more assertive and pro-active methods, rather than wait for disorder to occur. Campbell began to agitate "for a more aggressive, 'virile' and militant approach", which Goldfinch and Gillespie resisted and "Campbell was politely invited to resign".

On 18 February 1931 Campbell and seven of his personal friends and business associates (most of them ex-officers) met at the Imperial Service Club in Sydney with the object of forming a breakaway organisation called the 'New Guard'.^{[B]} Campbell brought along a draft policy for the meeting to consider, a document in the form of a military-style attestation paper intended for signing by all prospective members. Campbell's draft policy for "the New Guard" included the following features:

- Founding principles: "Unswerving loyalty" to the British Empire and its sovereign; support for "sane and honourable representative Government" in Australia and the "suppression of any disloyal and immoral elements in Governmental, industrial and social circles"; the "abolition of machine politics" and "maintenance of the full liberty of the subject".
- For those subscribing to its stated principles, the object of the organisation was to "unite all loyal citizens irrespective of creed, party, social or financial position" into one association pledging "loyal support" to the "duly appointed General Council" of the New Guard.
- In respect of the principles, objects and policy of the New Guard, "to decide upon and carry out within its power without fear or favour such action as from time to time may be in the true interests of Australia".

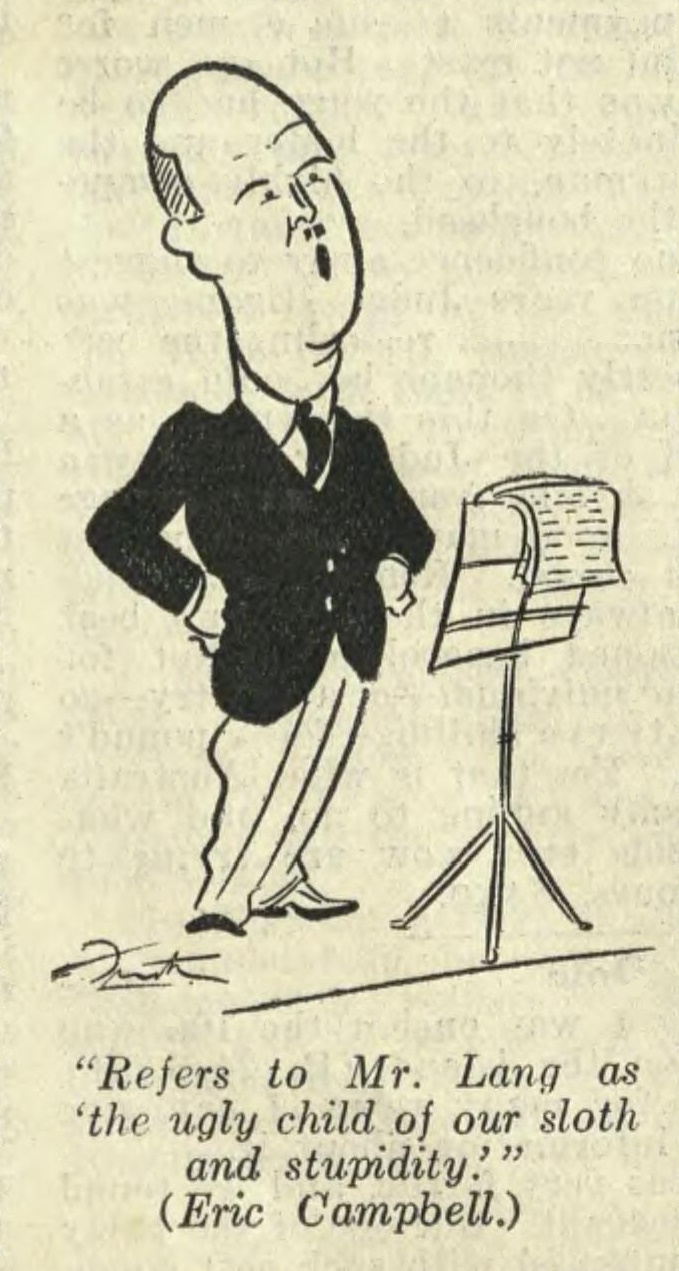
Published in The Bulletin, 29 July 1931.

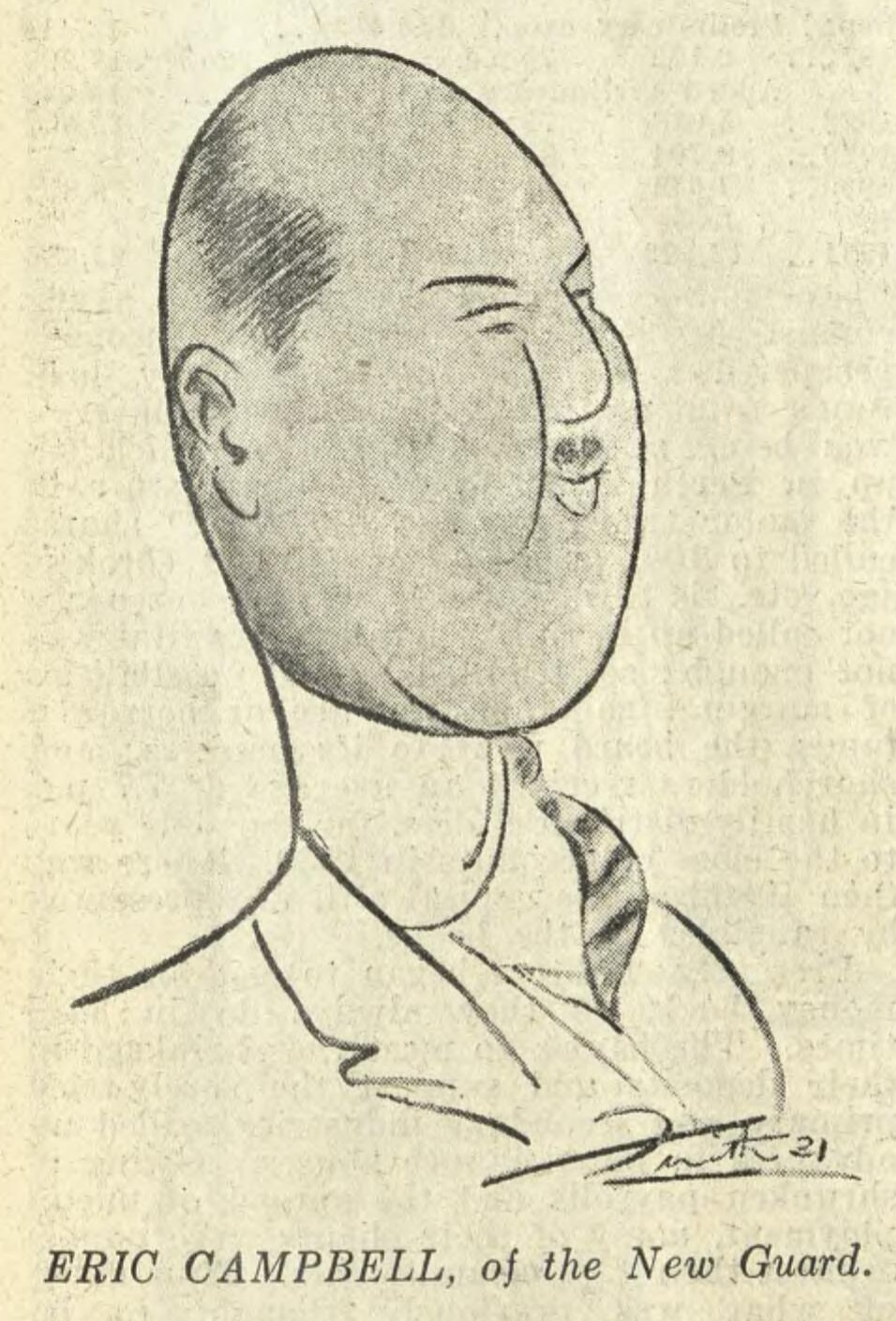
Published in The Bulletin, 30 December 1931.

Caricatures of Eric Campbell by John Frith.

Campbell's private interpretation of "such action" that may be required to be carried out by the New Guard, as he later described, included the possibility of illegal activities. In addition to the stated objective "to preserve law and order and maintain services", Campbell also included a second objective: "to foil any attempt, constitutional or unconstitutional, by the government to foist socialization on the people".

Campbell placed himself as commander of the New Guard and mass recruitment began in April 1931, using the ideology Campbell had drafted as attestation papers to be signed by all New Guardsmen. Efficient military-style recruiting methods were employed, with district units divided into localities and locality organisers and committees appointed to oversee local recruitment efforts. Rolls were compiled and maintained, and copies sent to headquarters, showing evidence of attendance at locality meetings and New Guard rallies. By May 1931 the New Guard claimed to have "membership of many thousands of responsible citizens", holding meetings "in every locality throughout the suburbs".

A meeting, described as "the Loyalist Reunion of the New Guard", was held a meeting at Sydney Town Hall on 22 July 1931, attended by an enthusiastic audience of four thousand. During his speech, Campbell declared that the organisation "is grimly determined and fully prepared, and, by the grace of God, able to prevent this State from being Sovietised, whether that attempt be brought about by open insurrection of the organised forces of Communism or by revolutionary enactments". Campbell's address to the gathering was broadcast live on radio station 2GB.

Campbell's oratory was described as "invariably wooden, his speeches rambling and disjointed, his delivery stilted". As a young man the labour historian Robin Gollan attended a New Guard rally in Wollongong and "was bored by long-winded addresses" delivered by Campbell and Francis de Groot; in later life he recalled that "as an imitation of a Nuremberg rally it was a flop". Campbell's business as a solicitor continued to flourish, even during the Depression years. In his words: "I had an almost princely income by the then standards from a thriving practice, which despite the Depression kept us busily engaged acting for receivers and liquidators instead of buyers and sellers as in boom days".

On the night of 11 December 1931 a large contingent of New Guard members disrupted a meeting at King's Cross, in support of a Communist Party candidate for the Senate at the upcoming federal election. The hostile section of the crowd initially tried to drown out the speakers' voices "by singing patriotic songs". Later the Guardsmen made successive charges against the speakers' platform, surrounded by communist supporters estimated to number two hundred who were being "protected by a strong cordon of police". As the police tried to push back "the pressing throng", powdered cayenne pepper was thrown into the faces of three police officers. The crowd eventually broke through the police line and "smashed the platform" as the police escorted the speakers away from the scene. In December 1931 Scullin's federal Labor government was defeated in a massive landslide, and the United Australia Party (U.A.P.) led by Joseph Lyons took office.

The New Guard reached about sixty thousand members at its peak during 1931 and 1932, which also included a small number of women as part of an auxiliary group. The organisation was overwhelmingly a middle-class, made up mostly of urban professionals and small businessmen. Working-class membership varied from locality to locality and, in general, the New Guard was opposed by workers and trade unions (although right-wing unions such as the Railway Services Union were supporters). Most of the leadership of the New Guard had served as officers during World War I and continued to denote themselves after the highest military rank they had achieved. Ex-servicemen were far less represented in the general membership (estimated at one-fifth in the inner city locality).

In January 1932 Campbell was charged with using insulting words against the New South Wales premier, Jack Lang, during an address by the New Guard leader at Lane Cove Picture Theatre. Campbell had described Lang as a "scoundrel", a "buffoon" and as a "tyrant" during his speech. On 2 February 1932 in the Central Summons Court, the Chief Stipendiary Magistrate agreed that the word "scoundrel", applied by Campbell to the premier, was "clearly insulting" and imposed a fine of two pounds (with eight shillings costs).

==== Activities ====
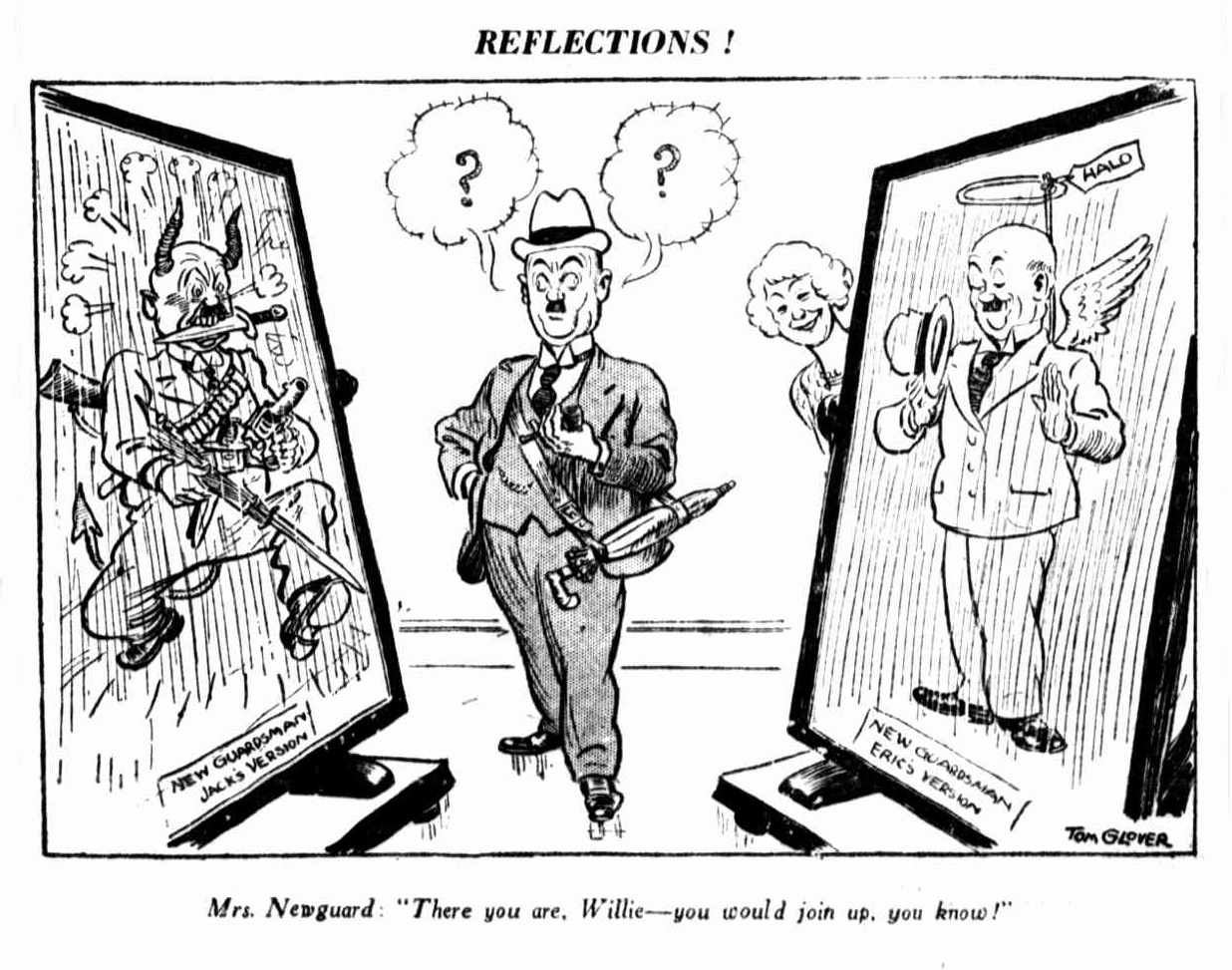
'Reflections!', a cartoon by Tom Glover, published in The Sun (Sydney), 12 May 1932.

On 18 February 1932 the New Guard held a rally in the Sydney Town Hall to celebrate the first anniversary of the formation of the organisation. The hall was crowded and the proceedings were broadcast to a large assemblage outside. During his speech Campbell stated that "if the forces of [communist] revolution attempted anything, and if the Council of Action so decreed, the New Guard, without the loss of life, could take over the control of State".

New Guardsmen were regularly involved in disrupting meetings of left-wing and unemployed organisations, often with violent intent. Taking advantage of their access to motor vehicles, the Guardsmen were able to rapidly mobilise to obstruct and break up meetings throughout the suburbs of Sydney. On the evening of 26 February 1932 about three hundred members of the New Guard, travelling in about fifty motor cars, disrupted "a Communist meeting" being held at Thompson Park in Bankstown. The New Guardsmen mingled around the platform and sang patriotic songs. Anyone who "failed to remove their hats when the National Anthem was sung", had their hats "knocked from their heads". Further disruptions and fights ensued and the police were sent for, but the New Guardsmen had driven off before they arrived. On the same evening a meeting of the Unemployed Workers' Movement in Newtown was similarly disrupted.

In early January 1932, in response to reports of out-of-control bushfires in central western New South Wales and encouraged by The Sun newspaper, the New Guard agreed to send two hundred volunteer Guardsmen to Cobar to assist with fire-fighting duties. Five double-decker buses were provided by Federick Stewart, a bus proprietor and director of The Sun, and petrol, food and equipment was donated by oil companies and major Sydney retailers. The convoy set off on 9 January, arriving at Cobar three days later to be informed that all the major fires were under control.

Shortly before the official opening of the Sydney Harbour Bridge on 19 March 1932 a zone commander of the New Guard, Francis de Groot, rode up to the official party on horseback and cut the ribbon with a sword. When the ribbon was severed he shouted: "I declare this bridge opened in the name of the people of New South Wales, in the name of common decency and decent politics". De Groot had been a captain in the 15th Hussars and British Tank Corps, and wore his military uniform on the day. Police held the horse's head, De Groot was pulled to ground and taken from the scene.

In the early hours of Friday morning, 6 May 1932, the prominent trade union leader and Lang supporter Jock Garden was awakened from sleep at his Maroubra home and enticed into his backyard by eight men claiming to be police, when he was "brutally assaulted", possibly as a prelude to kidnapping him. Garden called out to his two sons and they and the family's Airedale Terrier joined the fray. When somebody called out "he's got a gun", seven of the assailants hurriedly left the scene in a motor car, leaving one of their number, William Scott, bailed up against a fence by the dog. Scott was eventually taken to his home and arrested the following day by the police. The other seven men were later arrested. On 9 May the eight men, "alleged to be New Guardsmen", were each sentenced to three months' imprisonment.

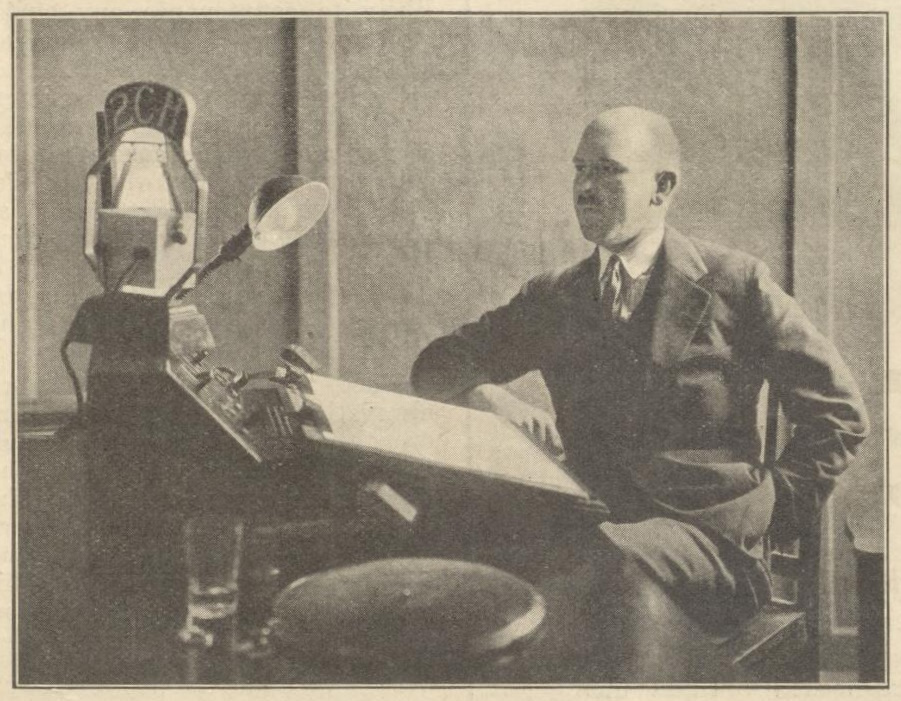
Campbell broadcasting from the 2CH Studio, Sydney, September 1932.

After the dismissal of the Lang government by Sir Philip Game, the governor of New South Wales, in May 1932 and its subsequent electoral defeat, "the New Guard lost much of its raison d'être". Many members regarded the defeat of Lang's Labor government as signalling an end to "the period of social emergency", with the identity and purpose of the New Guard seeming to be "increasingly problematic". As the membership began to decline, Campbell remarked that the "lookers on" had been removed, "leaving men whose loyalty can be depended upon". Campbell's colleague, Francis de Groot, had a different view; his opinion was that the movement lost focus after Lang's departure so that "trifles were magnified and with no enemy to fight, we commenced to bicker amongst ourselves".

Campbell used the medium of commercial radio to communicate with New Guard members and spread his message to new audiences. Others suggested that his radio broadcasts were an effort to stem the dwindling membership numbers of the New Guard. During a broadcast in September 1932 he stated that one of the New Guard's principles was "the suppression of the disloyal elements in the community and in Government circles". Campbell added that the blame for the prevailing conditions was the "idle, pleasure-loving, fear-ridden people, who composed the majority of Australians at the present time". In a broadcast address on 1 December 1932 Campbell described Australians as "weak, lazy, and unindustrious, incapable of holding their land against an invader", declaring that they "had failed miserably as trustees of Empire".

Francis de Groot resigned from the New Guard in November 1932 "as an expression of his dissatisfaction with the higher command's control and the direction of its policy". In December 1932 it was reported that Campbell would depart for England in early January.

==== Overseas trip ====
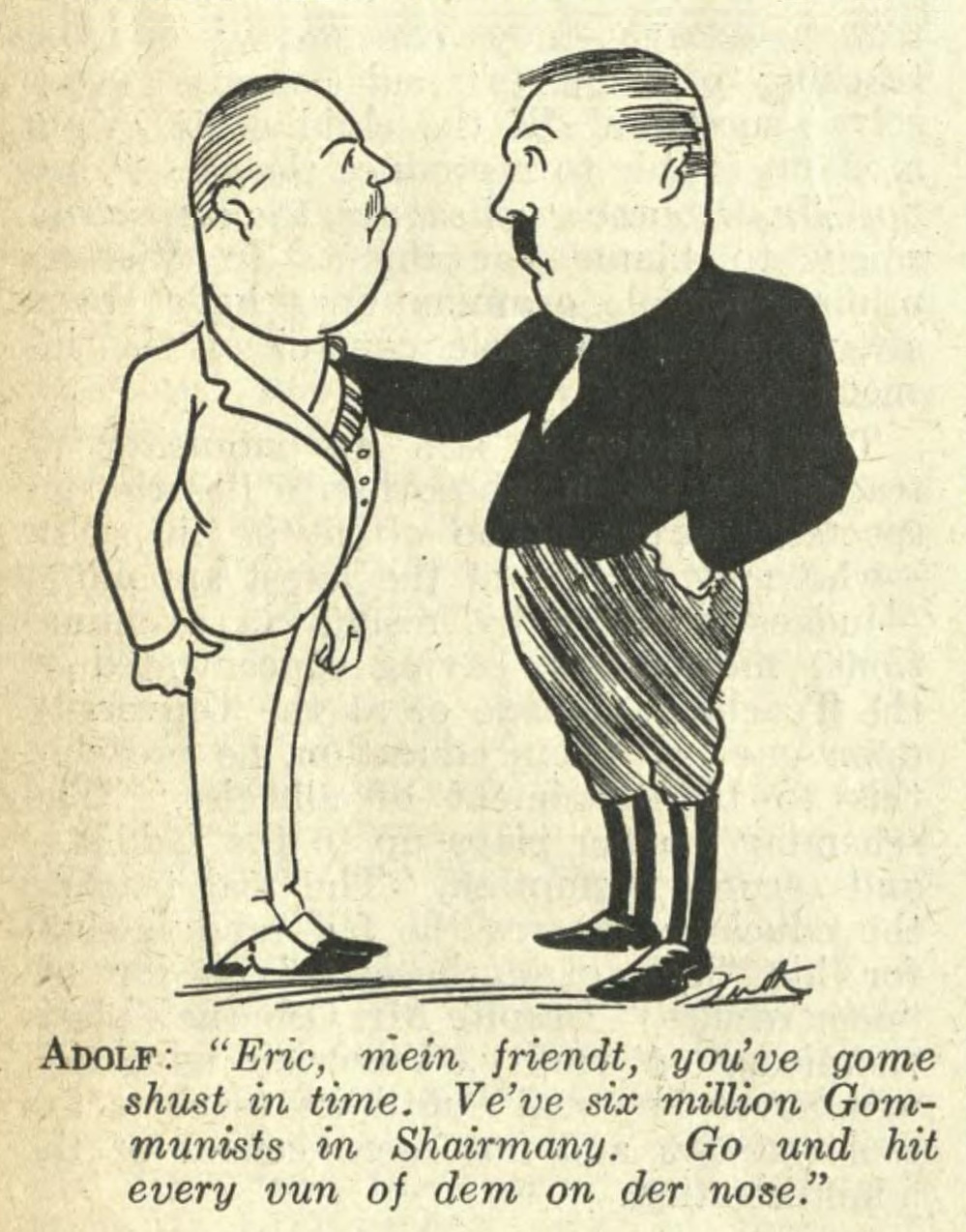
Caricatures of Campbell and Adolf Hitler by John Frith (The Bulletin, 8 February 1933).

On 6 January 1933 Campbell embarked on a tour of Europe in order to supplement "his data about Fascism". As he departed from Sydney aboard the R.M.S. Oronsay, Campbell was "tooted down the Harbour by a ferry boat loaded with admirers". In England Campbell was able to meet the British fascist leader Sir Oswald Mosley and his wife at their home for lunch. In Berlin and Rome he was frustrated by his inability to meet either Hitler or Mussolini, "making do with their underlings". In Berlin he observed a parade of one hundred thousand Nazis "goose-stepping their way past the former Imperial Palace on Unter den Linden".

In London Campbell was invited to deliver an address at the headquarters of the British Union of Fascists (B.U.F.). On 6 April 1933 the New Guard leader was ceremoniously escorted by two hundred black-shirted fascists from Whitehall to the B.U.F. headquarters near the Houses of Parliament. As he entered, the staircases were lined with fascists "standing stiffly at attention, saluting". During his address Campbell predicted "that the time was not far distant when the Empire would be ruled by Fascists". He declared that the New Guard's organisation in Australia "almost equals that of Mussolini" and said that "orders must emanate from a single man", adding that "I alone give orders, and the New Guard execute them to the letter". The journalist who reported on the event reported that the fascists "insisted on the Press representatives joining in the salute as Mr. Campbell left the building".

During Campbell's absence in Europe the central headquarters of the New Guard "ruled the units with a rod of iron". A "secret police" was formed to attend all meetings and report on instances of disloyalty, often leading to notices of expulsion being issued to members.

Campbell returned to Sydney aboard the R.M.S. Oronsay in early August 1933, "enthusiastic about the fascist transformation of Europe". When questioned about recent press reports of "German atrocities against the Jews", Campbell replied that "all the Jews he saw were well-dressed and fat, and were eating at expensive restaurants".

==== Meetings ====
At a meeting of the New Guard in Ashfield Town Hall on 7 September 1933, Campbell "devoted most of his address to a eulogy of the Germans, and Hitlerism in particular", as well as praising Italian fascism. He stated that "we of the New Guard are sick of party politicians" and predicted that the movement would be "the organising and protecting factor" at the next elections in New South Wales. After Campbell's address, while a monetary collection was being taken at the meeting, another speaker "said the New Guard was not a rich organisation, and it had not paid for the trip of a certain member just returned from Europe".

After his return to Australia, Campbell introduced "an array of imitative fascist paraphernalia" to the New Guard. At public appearances Campbell was surrounded by a ten-member bodyguard "who clicked their heels and marched in formation" and the fascist salute became a standard feature of meetings. A uniform was adopted of a white shirt, grey flannel trousers, grey tie and purple armbands. After Campbell introduced fascist ritual to the New Guard, "including the salute by a bodyguard whenever he visited a locality, and continual requests for donations towards the maintenance of headquarters", a renewed undercurrent of discontent began to grow within the organisation.

On 16 October 1933 Campbell addressed a group of university undergraduates at the invitation of the Public Questions Society. The New Guard leader gave the fascist salute, prompting "laughs and cheers" from the audience. During his speech Campbell criticised efforts by the League of Nations to "keep the Germans from arming". He predicted that "if the present attitude of suppression of German armaments was continued", Europe "would shortly be involved" in a war.

In November 1933 it was estimated that the New Guard membership had decreased by 38,500 during the previous twelve months.

An attempt was made to depose Campbell from the New Guard in November 1933. A conference at the New Guard Rooms, 533 George Street, Sydney, of 120 delegates claiming to represent 14 of the 19 principal 'localities' of the New Guard resolved to remove Campbell and his executive committee from membership of the organisation and appoint a council of 14 members in their place to control the movement. The resolution carried at the conference declared no confidence in Campbell and his executive and affirmed an "intention of cleansing the New Guard of all subversive elements and tawdry theatricalities". It was reported that "new ideas introduced by Campbell following upon his return from abroad are responsible for the revolt". Campbell's response to the events was to declare "that the meeting was not a meeting of the New Guard, but of a number of men who had been found unsuitable to the movement".

=== Politics ===
In September 1933 Campbell announced that the New Guard would be running candidates at the next state election in New South Wales, representing a new political party to be known as the Centre Party (also known as the Centre Movement). Campbell explained that the decision had been arrived at because the Federal and State U.A.P. governments had failed to honor election promises to "eradicate Communism and to repeal socialistic legislation passed by the Lang Government". He added that it was the intention of the Centre Party to "smash machine politics... and to eliminate the hack politician".

At a meeting of over a thousand members of the New Guard on 4 December 1933 at the Assembly Hall, Campbell declared his intention to establish one hundred branches of the Centre Party. He criticised the U.A.P. as having "feet of clay and head of concrete" and described the state premier, Bertram Stevens, and the prime minister, Joseph Lyons, as "nothing more than a pair of mummers". Campbell concluded his speech by declaring "I hate politics", adding: "I regard politics as wading through a slimy morass of filth to a promised land".

In late 1934 Campbell's book The New Road was published. Publicity for the book claimed that it "blazes the trail to Political Freedom and Industrial Justice – the book that sweeps away the Party System, eliminates Professional Politicians, and frees the people from the dictatorship of minority control".

In April 1935, at a meeting of "several hundred supporters of the Centre Movement" in the Assembly Hall, Campbell announced that the organisation "would participate actively in the State election campaign". He nominated the "keynote of the Centre Movement" as political reform. Campbell described the Parliament as being made up of representatives held hostage by whichever political party they belonged, a system he vowed to change. The second proposal for political reform was a radical change to the electorates, converting the geographical areas to a system of vocational representation reflecting "the various industrial, professional and cultural associations which in their entirety make up the life of the nation".

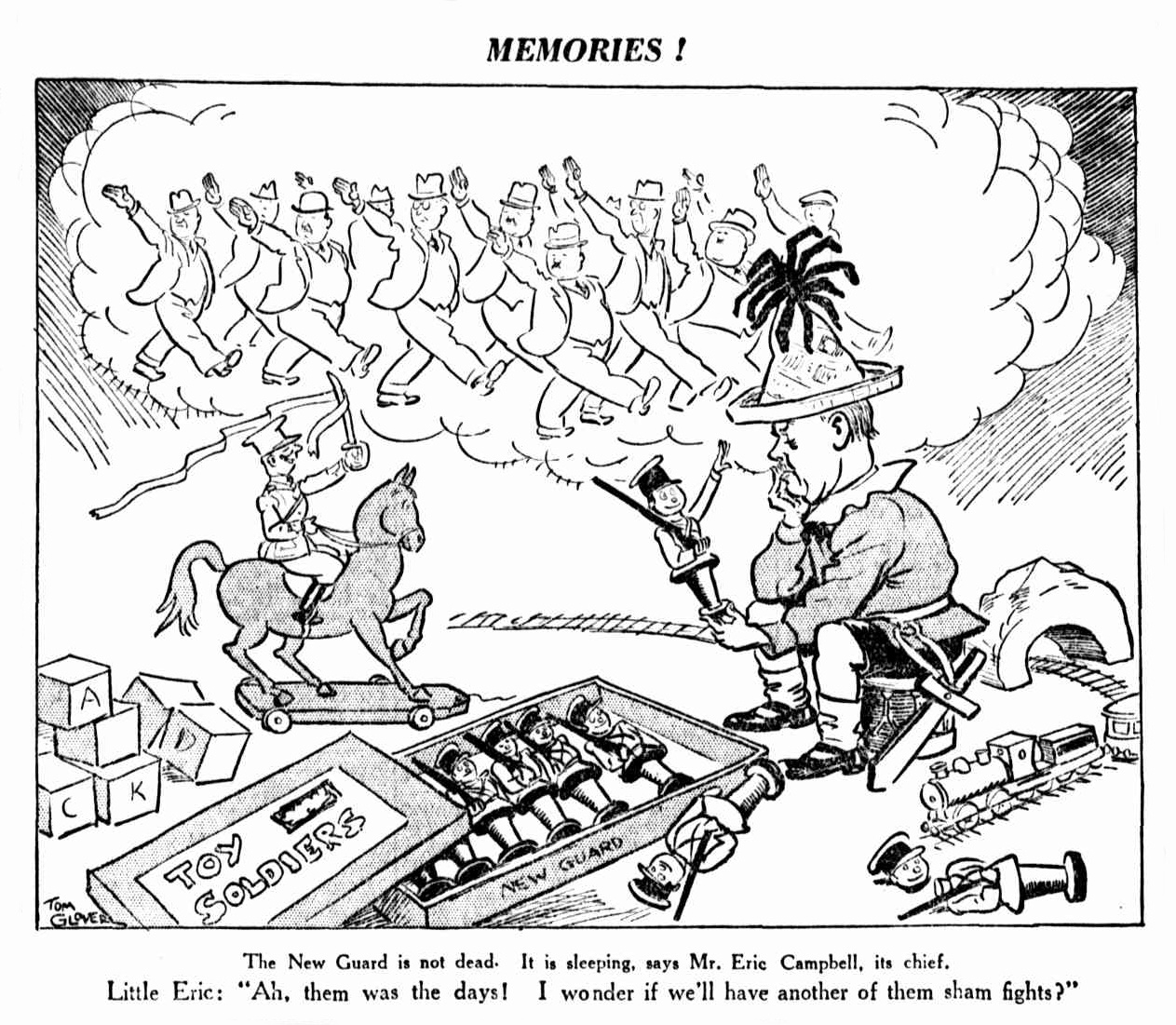
'Memories!', a cartoon by Tom Glover, published in The Sun (Sydney), 18 June 1937.

In the end the Centre Party contested only four seats in the New South Wales election held on 11 May 1935, in the electorates of Lane Cove (Eric Campbell), Hornsby (Fergus Munro), George's River (James Fowler) and Arncliffe (Enoch Jones). Campbell was one of two candidates for the seat of Lane Cove; Herbert FitzSimons of the United Australia Party was elected with Campbell receiving only 16.7 percent of the votes. Two of the other Centre Party candidates lost their deposits due to the insufficient number of votes they received.

By 1935 the New Guard "was largely moribund and discredited".

In September 1936 Campbell was one of an informal gathering of about seventy Australian and German ex-servicemen at the German Club Concordia. The Australians were described as representatives of returned soldiers' organisations. Captain Koehler, on behalf of the German ex-servicemen, proposed toasts to both the English king George VI and to the German führer, Adolf Hitler. Campbell replied to the toasts "on behalf of the Australian returned men", expressing the wish that "never again will there be a war between Britain and Germany", adding: "Those people are of the same race and the same creed, and... I hope that, if war should come again, they will... fight side by side and not against each other". At the meeting of the Sherwood sub-branch of the Returned Soldiers' League in November 1936, the president of the sub-branch, Frank Silverstone, criticised Campbell's reported action of having toasted Hitler on behalf of Australian returned soldiers. Silverstone asked if any authority had been given to Campbell to act on behalf of the sub-branch, or any other State sub-branch, and the meeting agreed to forward a letter of protest to league headquarters.

==== The Du Menier legal case ====
In 1938 Campbell was charged with conspiracy to pervert the course of justice and to cheat and defraud Du Menier Laboratories Ltd., a subsidiary of Australian Soaps Ltd., of which he was chairman. On 11 July 1938 Campbell and two others were committed for trial at the Central Criminal Court on charges of conspiracy and perjury. The prosecution alleged that a minute book had been falsified in order that the three men "could escape the payment of a large sum of money, representing calls on shares which they held in the company". The trial proceedings occupied nineteen days. In early October 1938 a jury returned verdicts of not guilty for each of the accused.

On 27 February 1939 Eric Campbell appeared before a Full Bench of the New South Wales Supreme Court "to show cause why he should not be struck off the roll of solicitors". The charges arose from an Equity case to vary the list of contributors of Du Menier Laboratories. After a settlement was reached Judge Reginald Long Innes forwarded a report to the attorney-general stating that he was satisfied that Campbell had "attempted to support the false evidence manufactured out of court by deliberate perjury". On 5 April 1939 the Full Court, in a majority decision of two to one, decided that the charges against Eric Campbell of perjury and complicity in the falsification of minutes had not been proven and so the solicitor was allowed to remain on the roll of solicitors. However, Campbell was ordered to pay the costs of the proceedings, on the ground "that he had been a party to irregularities which gave rise to legitimate suspicion".

=== Return to Young ===
During World War II Campbell "served for a short period at the School of Gunnery at Puckapunyal" in Victoria.

Campbell moved to the 'Billabula' property near Young in 1941 and practiced as a lawyer, working in Young.

In June 1945 the Young branch of the Country Party nominated Campbell as their candidate for the Hume electorate at the next Federal election. After the nomination the Australian Country Party secretary wrote to the Young branch advising that "in the opinion of the party executive, Mr. Campbell was not a suitable candidate to contest Hume". When the letter was read at a meeting of branch members, the president, treasurer and secretary resigned in protest, but after a unanimous vote of confidence, they agreed to resume their offices. The branch then voted to defy the central executive and wrote to inform them that Campbell's name would remain as their nomination. A meeting of the Hume Electorate Council of the Country Party was held at Wagga Wagga in October 1945 to consider the endorsement of a candidate for the electorate. Campbell attended as the representative of the Young branch and was one of the five candidates submitted for endorsement. After a ballot, Brigadier Warren McDonald of Canberra, formerly the commanding officer of the Kapooka Base near Wagga, was selected as the party's candidate.

On the night of 26 January 1946 Campbell's homestead at 'Billabula' near Young was destroyed by fire.

In 1948 Campbell applied to the Central Army Records Office for the replacement of his medals and decorations that were destroyed in the 'Billabula' homestead fire. Those listed to be replaced were: the Distinguished Service Order, the Coronation Medal (George V, 1911) and a Volunteer decoration.

By August 1948 Campbell had been elected as a councillor of the Burrangong Shire Council. In December 1949 Campbell was elected as Shire President of the council.

=== Later years ===
In 1957, Campbell bought 'Yuemburra' station and homestead near Yass and moved there to live.

In 1965 Campbell's book, The Rallying Point: My Story of the New Guard, was published.

Campbell moved to Canberra in 1966 where he worked as a solicitor, but his health was increasingly impaired by injuries received in an accident in 1959.

Eric Campbell died of cancer on 2 September 1970 in Canberra Hospital, aged 77.

== Publications ==
- Eric Campbell (1934), The New Road: An Explanation of an Effective System of Selecting Governments in Keeping with Present-day Conditions, and also a Critical Commentary on Existing Institutions to Indicate the Urgent Need of Reform, Sydney: Briton Publications.
- Eric Campbell (1965). The Rallying Point: My Story of the New Guard. Carlton, Victoria: Melbourne University Press.

== Notes ==
A.William John Rendell ('Jack') Scott was born at Bingara on 21 June 1888, the son of Donald Scott (bank manager) and Maria (née Street). His mother was the sister of Sir Philip Street, Chief Justice and Lieutenant-Governor of New South Wales at dismissal of J. T. Lang in May 1932. His younger brother, Allan Humphrey Scott, died in 1917. He died on 19 November 1956 in Adelaide.

B.The seven other founding members of the New Guard were (with their previous military ranks, where appropriate): Major George E. Knox (Sydney manager of Eagle, Star, and British Dominions Insurance), Captain Norman Plomley (a tallow exporter), Major A. L. Rickard (son of Sydney businessman Sir Arthur Rickard), Captain T. P. Clark (insurance broker), Lieutenant A. G. Farleigh (of Farleigh & Co., tanners), Arthur Macarthur-Onslow (a director of Camden Park Estate) and a Mr. Grant (a dentist from Ashfield).
