= King and Empire Alliance =

- Abbreviation: KEA
- Founded: 1920; 106 years ago
- Dissolved: 1926; 100 years ago
- Headquarters: Sydney, New South Wales, Australia
- Newspaper: King and Empire
- Membership (1922): ▲ <10,000
- Ideology: Monarchism; Conservatism; Anti-communism; "Imperial patriotism"
- Political position: Right-wing
- Colours: Blue
- Slogan: “For King and Empire”

Union Jack

The King and Empire Alliance (KEA) was an Australian conservative-monarchist political organisation that operated in the early 1920s. Originally established as the United Loyalist Executive (ULE) (a coalition of loyalist leagues and patriotic societies in Queensland) around 1919, the organisation changed its name to the King and Empire Alliance in mid-1919 before being formally launched on 19 August 1920 at the Sydney Town Hall. (Note: Cited as 19 July 1920 by Matthew Cunningham.)

== History ==
The KEA's founding was attended by many conservative politicians and prominent military figures, and backed by The Sydney Morning Herald. Described as being founded “amidst scenes of extraordinary enthusiasm”, British Brigadier general John Vaughan Campbell said the KEA was “very much on the lines” of the “Fascisti movement in Italy.” Having a peak membership around 10,000 in 1922, its strongest support came from rural New South Wales.

The KEA's goal was to 'prevent the spread of disloyal doctrines, to counteract and destroy the malign influence of disloyalists, and to build up and maintain a healthy national sentiment for the consolidation of the Empire, and for the advancement of our own Commonwealth.'

The KEA received intrigue, praise and endorsement from various political and military figures, including First Sea Lord of the Admiralty John Jellicoe, 1st Earl Jellicoe while visiting Australia to promote closer Imperial bonds (1919); Prime Minister of the United Kingdom David Lloyd George, who said he was 'greatly interested to learn of the work of the King and Empire Alliance' (1920); and Major general Granville Ryrie whom announced he was 'cordially in favour of the movement' (1920).

== Notable members ==
- Sydney Herring
- James Macarthur-Onslow
- Charles Rosenthal
- Mungo William MacCallum

== Citations ==
- Moore, Andrew (1989). The Secret Army and the Premier: Conservative Paramilitary Organisations in New South Wales 1930–32. University of New South Wales Press. ISBN 978-0868402833.
- Cunningham, Matthew (2022). Mobilising the Masses: Populist Conservative Movements in Australia and New Zealand During the Great Depression (PDF). ANU Press. ISBN 9781760465117.
- Melrose, Craig (2004). "A praise that never ages": The Australian War Memorial and the "national" interpretation of the First World War, 1922–35 (Thesis). University of Queensland.
- Cunningham, Matthew (2015). The reactionary and the radical: A comparative analysis of mass conservative mobilisation in Australia and New Zealand during the Great Depression (Thesis). Victoria University of Wellington.
- Evans, Raymond (1988). The Red Flag Riots: A Study of Intolerance. UQ Press. ISBN 0702220736.
- Cathcart, Michael (1988). Defending The National Tuckshop: Australia's Secret Army Intrique of 1931. McPhee Gribble/Penguin. ISBN 0-86-914077-9.
