= Centre Party (New South Wales) =

Centre Party Centre Reform Group
- Leader: Eric Campbell
- Founder: Eric Campbell
- Founded: 4 December 1933; 92 years ago
- Dissolved: c. 1935
- Headquarters: Sydney, New South Wales
- Paramilitary wing: New Guard
- Membership (1933): c. 15,000
- Ideology: Australian fascism; Nationalism; Corporatism; Monarchism; Anti-communism
- Political position: Far-right
- Affiliate parties: New Zealand Legion
- Colours: Black
- Slogan: "Justice, Sincerity and Efficiency"

The Centre Party, or the Centre Reform Group, and occasionally referred to as the Centre Movement, was a short-lived extreme-right political party that operated in the Australian state of New South Wales. Founded in December 1933, the party's leader and most prominent figure was Eric Campbell, the leader of the paramilitary New Guard movement. That organisation had been established to oppose what its members perceived as the socialist tendencies of Jack Lang, the Premier of New South Wales, but declined following Lang's dismissal in early 1932. The party, unlike most fascist-oriented parties in Europe, acted as a wing of its more prominent paramilitary arm.

The Centre Party contested five seats at the 1935 state election, and its candidates placed second to the United Australia Party (UAP) in two electorates, with almost 20% of the vote. However, it polled poorly in the other seats it contested, and disbanded shortly after the election. The Centre Party is generally seen as the political extension of the remnant of the New Guard, which had decreased in popularity and influence, and, under Campbell's leadership, had become increasingly inclined towards fascism.

== History ==
=== Background and formation ===
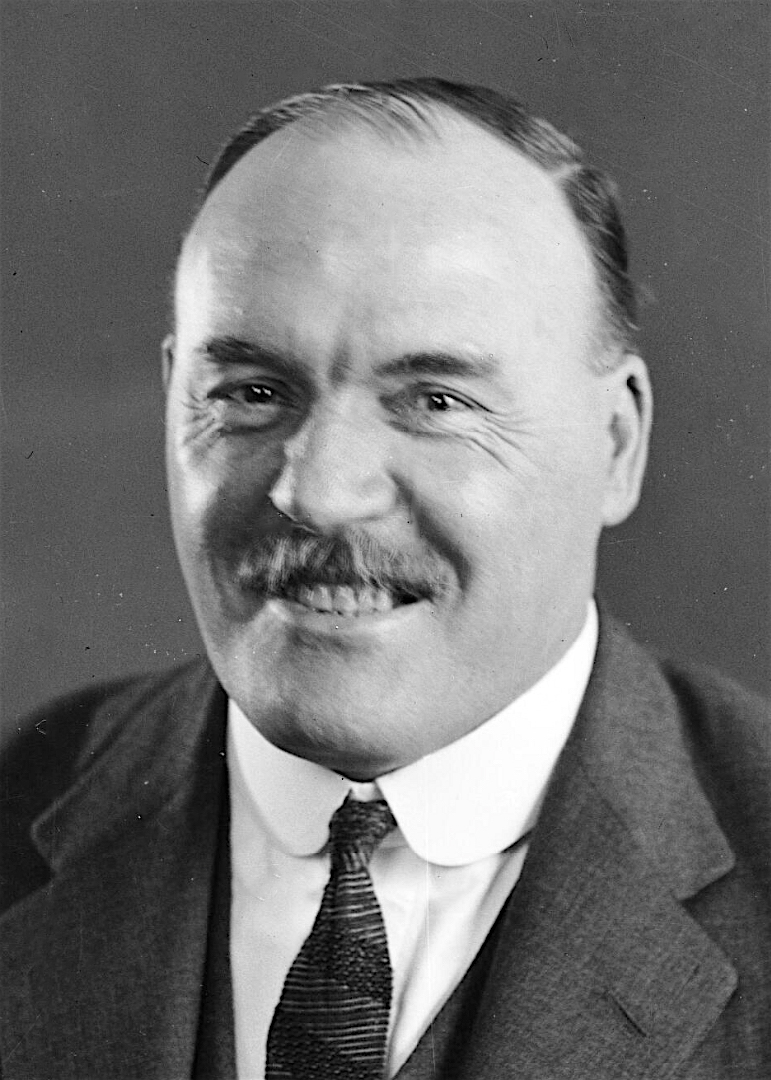
The New Guard was formed to oppose the policies of Jack Lang, the leader of the Labor Party and Premier of New South Wales from 1925 to 1927 and again from 1930 to his dismissal in 1932.

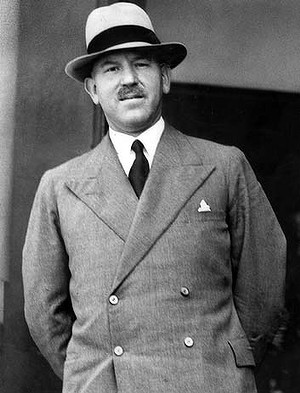
Eric Campbell was the Centre Party's founder, and leader throughout its brief history.

With Eric Campbell, a solicitor and former officer in the Australian Imperial Force (AIF), as "principal founder", the New Guard was established in February 1931, open to "all loyal citizens irrespective of creed, party, social or financial position". Campbell's new organisation sprang out of the Old Guard, a "secretive" group of Sydney-based businessmen formed to oppose Jack Lang, the Premier of New South Wales and the leader of the Labor Party, which had gained power at the October 1930 state election. At the height of its power, the movement had been "overwhelmingly a middle-class organisation", and was, in general, "virulently opposed by workers and trade unions", with the exception of the Railway Service Association and other right-wing unions. Its main goal was achieved in early May 1932, when Lang's government was dismissed by Sir Philip Game, the Governor of New South Wales. Lang had refused to pay interest on loans from overseas creditors, and withdrew government money from bank accounts to prevent the federal government from appropriating it for that purpose. He was replaced as premier by Bertram Stevens, who led a coalition of the conservative United Australia Party and United Country Party to a landslide victory at the subsequent June 1932 state election. The anti-Labor parties together gained 31 seats and won just under half of the popular vote.

The New Guard and other radical groups "lost much of their motivation" following the defeat of Lang at the 1932 election, with the New Guard confronted with an "unmistakable decline in membership" following Lang's dismissal. In late 1932, Campbell had begun to outline more fully his political beliefs, producing a series of broadcasts in which he develop a "complete credo for a fascist State", most notably incorporating a "non-elective cabinet or commission, a corporative assembly, vocational franchise and a charter of liberty". He also stated his intentions to contest the next state election, a date for which had not yet been set. In early 1933, Campbell toured Europe, meeting with Sir Oswald Mosley, the leader of the British Union of Fascists, and also with German and Italian leaders. However, on his return to Australia, Campbell's support for an "openly pro-fascist policy" was met with strong opposition from the Guard's "anti-fascist moderates". These attempts to "establish the movement as Australia's first fascist party" are thought to have "hastened the New Guard's decline", with many previous members "disinclined to accept what was in fact the movement's true character".

The Centre Party was formally established on 4 December 1933 at a meeting, described as having “over 1,000 people” in attendance. The Sydney Morning Herald reported that “100 branches” of the party would be established. The “majority of the diminishing movement” endorsed its move into electoral politics, which was, according to Campbell, “necessitated by the failure of the UAP governments, at both federal and state levels, to accede to the New Guard's demands”.

But here we are today, without anyone to work for us in whom we have confidence. The U.A.P. has turned out to be a false god, so following the advice of Thomas Carlisle, we are going to throw it away and seek new ones. And this brings us face-to-face with the reality of the problem, which is that Australian democracy is a sordid farce. It is a negation of all it pretends to achieve. Its path, unlike the road to hell, is not even paved with good intentions, it is merely an easy downhill grade to the pestilential waters of communism. It has made the average individual just about as free as a medieval slave. It is politically insane and industrially it is a calamity. We have no quarrel with the ideals of liberal democracy. We applaud and support them. What we say is that a nation cannot thrive on an ideal in direct contradiction to the reality which masquerades as that ideal. The institutions that have been erected by non-practical visionaries are the cause of the failure.

— Excerpt from Eric Campbell's speech at the founding of the party, Liberty (1933).

The party did not contest the September 1934 federal election, as there was “not time to organise it”. An August 1934 meeting of the New Guard reaffirmed Campbell as leader, and resolved to “make itself felt in the next state elections”.

=== 1935 election and aftermath ===
At the May 1935 New South Wales state election, the Centre Party contested five out of the 90 Legislative Assembly districts, all in suburban Sydney, and polled 0.60 percent of the total vote. In two seats, Hornsby, contested by Fergus Munro, and Lane Cove, contested by Campbell, only the Centre Party and the United Australia Party fielded candidates, with the former polling over 15 percent of the vote in both seats. In the other seats it contested, the Centre Party candidates failed to poll more than 5 percent of the vote. The party's relatively high vote in Hornsby and Lane Cove is thought to have represented "merely the level of protest against [UAP Premier] Stevens" in the absence of other candidates.

In Arncliffe, the only seat that required a preference distribution, the majority (56.78%) of Centre Party preferences flowed to the United Australia candidate, Horace Harper, who was defeated by Labor's Joseph Cahill, a future premier. Enoch Jones, the candidate for Arncliffe, later served as a City of Rockdale councillor, and contested the seat of Rockdale for the Liberal Democrats at the 1944 state election. The unsuccessful candidate for the electorate of Concord, Aubrey Murphy, may have been mistakenly classified as a Centre Party candidate or Murphy resigned from the party prior to the election. On 22 April 1935 a notice was published in the Sydney Morning Herald advising that Murphy had pointed out to the newspaper that "he has no association with any party, but is standing as an Independent candidate for the Concord electorate", despite having previously appeared "as a member of the Centre Movement". On two occasions in the 1950s Murphy served as mayor of the Blue Mountains City Council, and was named an MBE in the 1960 New Year Honours.

With the exception of occasional speaking engagements, Campbell himself largely withdrew from public life following the election, and spent most of the rest of his life in country New South Wales, where he was president of the Burrangong Shire Council in 1949 and 1950 (now part of Young Shire). Campbell's 1965 autobiographical account of his involvement in the New Guard, The Rallying Point, does not mention the Centre Party at all. Later writers have suggested that the party's lack of success at the 1935 election represented "an electoral brick-wall", with the party overall a "failure" and Campbell's movement having "lost most of its drive".

== Policies ==
At a gathering at the Presbyterian Assembly Hall in late February 1934, Campbell expounded fourteen "guiding principles" of the Centre Party, in order:

1. The unity of the political, industrial, and other functions of the State
2. The repeal of all socialistic legislation
3. The indissoluble association of capital and labour in all industries
4. Non-payment of members [of parliament]
5. The representation of the people and freedom from domination by the extreme Right or Left
6. The freedom of private enterprise
7. The evolution of a system of truly representative institutions based on vocational representation
8. The elimination of unemployment by efficient and economic government, and the development of the country's resources
9. That every man physically and mentally capable must work
10. The limitation of the Civil service to the minimum number of loyal citizens required for efficient administration and the functions of government
11. The abolition of bureaucratic control
12. The freeing of industry from unjust and inequitable taxation
13. The progressive settlement in fertile areas of men who cannot be absorbed in industry
14. The settlement and development of this State primarily with men and private capital from Great Britain and the British Empire, subject to the white Australia policy

== Analysis ==
In one of its first reports on the party, The Sydney Morning Herald wrote that the Centre Party would be "a distinct organisation from the New Guard", although with the New Guard's "backing". Later writers have generally viewed the party as simply the New Guard's political manifestation, representing "the culmination of the New Guard’s ideological evolution". Rodney Smith categorises the Centre Party with several other parties in the 1920s and 1930s that were attempting to "claim the centre ground" between the Labor parties (the ALP and Lang Labor) and the anti-Labor parties (the Nationalists and then the UAP). These other parties included the Australian Party (established by former prime minister Billy Hughes) and the All for Australia League, and had little in common other than being "anti-political", often deriving from "the clashing of factions within the major parties", and not representing "any kind of long-term challenge" to the party system. John McCarthy suggests Campbell's attempts to promote the party as centrist were a result of the "complete marginalisation of the far right" at the preceding 1932 state election. However, despite Campbell's appeal to the middle-class, Keith Amos notes the party was "almost completely disregarded by the popular press", with "public interest in right-wing militancy" evaporating.

Other authors have debated the extent to which the Centre Party was fascist. Matthew Cunningham describes the functions of the New Guard and Centre Party as "twofold": to "augment constitutional government as a physical bulwark against communism", and to "act as a moral force championing the tenets of individualism that had been inherited from Britain". However, he also notes that Campbell "clearly identified as a fascist, despite his later claims to the contrary". Amos writes that the New Guard "unequivocally stamped itself as a fascist organization, the first such movement in Australia to achieve this distinction".

== See also ==
- Australia First Movement
- Far-right politics in Australia
- List of political parties in Australia
- New Party
- New Guard

== Sources ==
- Amos, Keith (1976). The New Guard Movement 1931–1935. Melbourne University Press. ISBN 978-0-522-84092-6.
- Bird, David S. (2014). Nazi Dreamtime: Australian Enthusiasts for Hitler's Germany. Anthem Press. ISBN 9781783081240.
- Campbell, Eric (1934). The New Road. Briton Publications Limited.
- Cresciani, Gianfranco (1980). Fascism, Anti-Fascism and Italians in Australia, 1922–1945. ANU Press.
- Cunningham, Matthew (2012). "Australian Fascism? A Revisionist Analysis of the Ideology of the New Guard". Politics, Religion & Ideology. 13 (3): 375–393. doi:10.1080/21567689.2012.701188. S2CID 144794316.
- Cunningham, Matthew (2022). Mobilising the Masses: Populist Conservative Movements in Australia and New Zealand During the Great Depression. ANU Press. doi:10.22459/MM.2022. hdl:1885/275891. ISBN 978-17604-6510-0.
- McCarthy, John (2001). "The 1935 election". In Hogan, Michael; Clune, David (eds.). The People's Choice: Electoral Politics in Twentieth Century New South Wales. Vol. Two: 1930 to 1965. Parliament of New South Wales and University of Sydney. ISBN 978-0-909907-40-2.
- Moore, Andrew (1995). The Right Road? A History of Right-wing Politics in Australia. Oxford University Press. ISBN 978-01955-3512-9.
- Moore, Andrew (June 2011). "Discredited Fascism: the New Guard after 1932". Australian Journal of Politics and History. 57 (2): 188–206. doi:10.1111/j.1467-8497.2011.01591.x.
- Reid, Stephen (1980) The New Guard in Decline: Eric Campbell and the Centre Party 1933–1935, unpublished BA. Hons thesis, Macquarie University
- Smith, Rodney K. (2006). Against the Machines: Minor Parties and Independents in New South Wales, 1910–2006. Federation Press. ISBN 9781862876231.
