= Old Guard (Australia) =

Australian anti-communist organisation

- Formation: 1930
- Dissolved: 1952
- Type: Secret
- Region served: New South Wales, Australia
- Members: 30,000

The Old Guard was an Australian anti-communist organisation which was founded in 1930 and was primarily active in New South Wales. Its exact origins are disputed. At least one historian has claimed that it existed as early as 1917. It has been described as a paramilitary, quasi-official, vigilante, anti-communist organisation.

The group was primarily concerned with the social conditions arising from the Great Depression, and the actions of the Labor state government in New South Wales led by Premier Jack Lang. Rumours that agitators from the Old Guard were starting bush fires led to the more effective organisation of country bush fire brigades in New South Wales. As fears of a communist takeover subsided, the Old Guard lacked purpose and was dissolved sometime in the 1950s.

== Secrecy ==
The group was sworn to absolute secrecy regarding membership, and was divided into cells so that its leadership would be hard to identify. Media reports on the group in the 1930s were scarce, and information about it has been obscured by the destruction of its own records.

== Split ==
The New Guard split from the group in 1931. Eric Campbell wanted a more visible organisation than the secretive Old Guard. The New Guard was less of a military force than the Old Guard, which opposed the split because it was fearful of communists exploiting the division. Both groups had devised plans to neutralise each other should it be needed.

== Members ==
At the height of its popularity, the Old Guard in Australia had a membership of around 30,000. Members were loyalists and idealists devoted to the British Empire and ready to act pre-emptively to prevent a socialist revolution in Australia. Old Guard leaders were wealthy Protestant Anglo-Australians. Membership in rural New South Wales, and ties to the New South Wales police force, were strong.

At the federal level the Old Guard had its closest ties to the Attorney-General's Department and the Department of Defence.

Like many former officers of the Australian Army George Wootten joined the Old Guard.

== See also ==
- Far-right politics in Australia
- Military history of Australia
