= Tom Glover (cartoonist) =

English-born cartoonist (1891–1938)

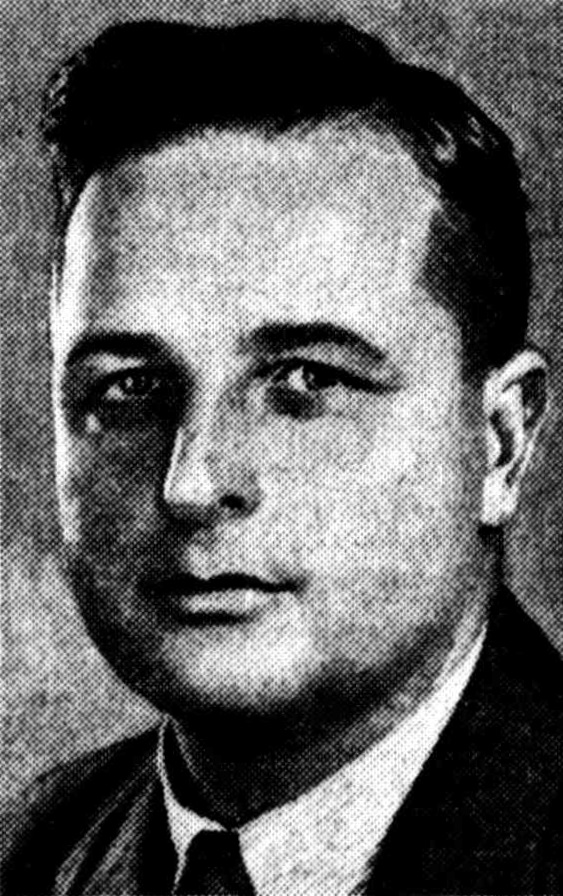
- Tom Glover.
- Born: Thomas Ellis Glover; 10 January 1891; Liverpool, England.
- Died: 7 September 1938 (aged 47); Sydney, Australia
- Occupations: Artist, cartoonist, illustrator, caricaturist
- Writing career
- Pen name: 'Ellis', 'Revolg'
- Period: 1911–1938

Signature
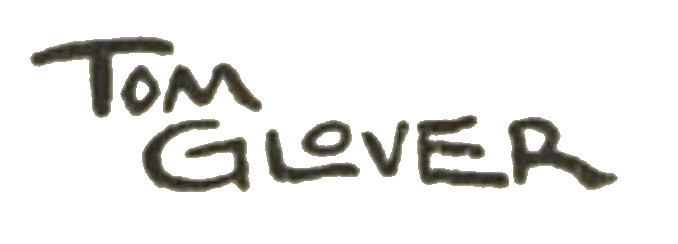

Thomas Ellis Glover (1891–1938) was a prolific cartoonist and caricaturist who worked in New Zealand and Australia. He began his professional career in 1911 as a cartoonist and court-reporter for the Wellington-based New Zealand Truth. After serving in France during World War I, Glover returned to Wellington and established himself as a respected and popular illustrator and cartoonist for The Free Lance and Truth newspapers, his work often dealing with political themes. In late 1922 Glover left New Zealand and settled in Melbourne, having accepted a job as cartoonist for the Sydney-based Bulletin magazine. In Australia he became widely-known for his political cartoons and insightful caricatures. In early 1928 Glover took up a position as the feature cartoonist for The Sun newspaper in Sydney. He died suddenly at his desk in September 1938, aged 47.

== Biography ==
=== Early years ===
Thomas Ellis Glover was born on 10 January 1891 at Liverpool, England, the eldest of four children of Thomas Glover and Hannah (née Ellis). Glover emigrated to New Zealand in about 1906, when he was aged about 15, and settled in Wellington on the southern tip of the North Island.

In Wellington Glover found a job as an elevator boy in the King's Chambers building, built in 1902 and located on the corner of Willis and Willeston streets. Glover began drawing caricatures of the regular clientele of his elevator, which he then used to decorate the lift walls.

=== Newspaper work ===
As a result of his informal exhibitions in the King's Chambers building, Glover's artistic talent came to the attention of the senior staff of the New Zealand Truth weekly newspaper and in 1911 he was employed as a cartoonist, regular court-reporter and occasional leader writer. Truth was published in Wellington and was the New Zealand edition of the Sydney Truth. For a short period Glover also held a junior position on the staff of The Dominion newspaper.

From 1912 Glover served in the New Zealand Garrison Artillery volunteer corps.

=== War service ===
Tom Glover and Dulcie Bell Quig were married 30 October 1916 at Wellington. In June 1917 the couple were living at 210 Tinakori Road, Wellington. Dulcie Glover gave birth to a daughter in April 1918, after her husband had enlisted in the army and been deployed to England.

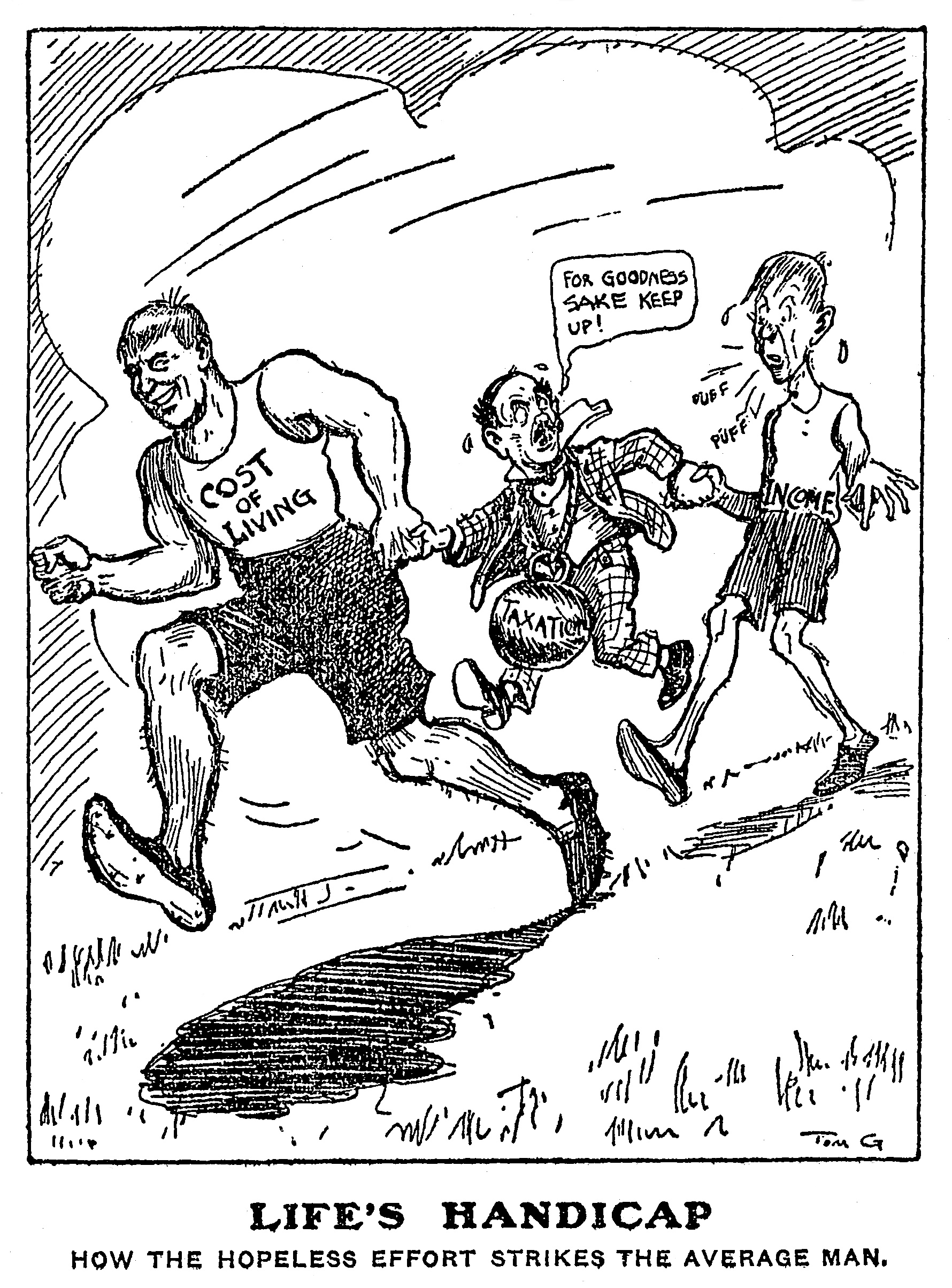
'Life's Handicap', published in New Zealand Truth, 8 March 1919.

On 14 June 1917, during World War I, Glover enlisted in the New Zealand Expeditionary Force. His deployment overseas was delayed due to a bout of pneumonia. Glover travelled to England aboard the troopship Ulimarou, arriving at Liverpool in March 1918. He was transferred to the New Zealand Field Artillery in June 1918 and in the following August he was sent to the war-front in France. Glover was officially discharged from the army in October 1919.

=== Return to Wellington ===
In December 1918 Glover succeeded Brodie Mack as the political cartoonist for The Free Lance weekly newspaper, published in Wellington, using the pseudonym 'Ellis' or 'T. Ellis'. His Christmas-themed illustration was used for the front-page of the 24 December 1918 edition.

In New Zealand Glover's skills as a cartoonist and illustrator were in such demand "that he had to resort to a multitude of aliases", using variations of his name including 'Revolg' (his surname backwards).

In April 1920 Glover's wife Dulcie died at a private hospital in Wellington "after seven weeks of severe suffering following the birth of her second child".

Glover also drew cartoons for the Public Service Journal in 1922.

=== The Bulletin ===
Tom Glover and Mabel ('May') Carstairs were married on 16 August 1922 at St. Mark's church in Wellington. Soon after the wedding the couple left New Zealand for Australia, where Glover took up the position of Melbourne cartoonist for the Sydney-based Bulletin magazine. Glover occupied an office at 268 Flinders Street in Melbourne.

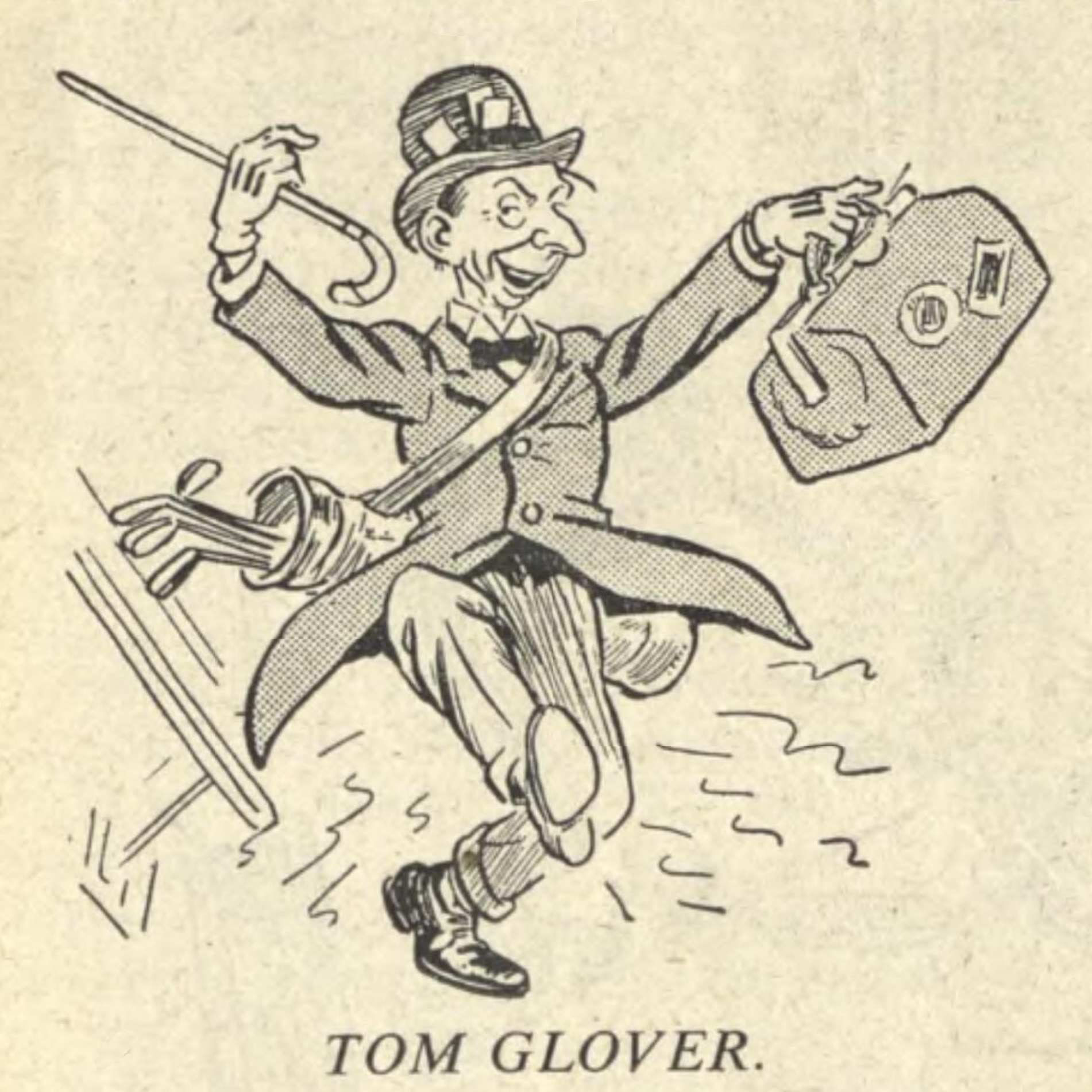
The artist soon after his arrival in Australia, originally published in The Bulletin, 7 September 1922.

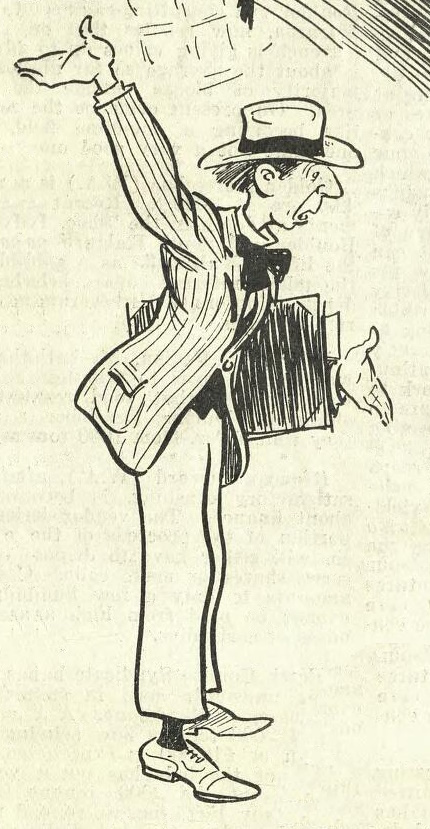
Published in The Bulletin, 1 March 1923.

Two examples of self-portraits by Tom Glover.

In The Bulletin of 28 December 1922 an illustration by Glover entitled 'Under the Mistletoe' was published in a full-page format. The cartoon was commentary on the recently completed federal election, depicting the competing political leaders – Billy Hughes (Nationalist Party), Matthew Charlton (Labor Party) and Earle Page (Country Party) – fawning over the office of Prime Minister ("The Belle of the Ball"), with 'Australia' ("The Wallflower") sitting to the side being ignored. When the cartoon was published the position of Prime Minister was yet to be determined after Hughes' Nationalist party failed to gain a majority of seats in the House of Representatives. The likely coalition partner, the Country Party, refused to accept Hughes as leader. The situation was resolved in February 1923 when Hughes resigned and his Treasurer, Stanley Bruce, became Prime Minister of a coalition government. Throughout the negotiations between the Nationalist and Country parties, Glover's weekly cartoons in the Bulletin provided a running commentary on the unfolding situation.

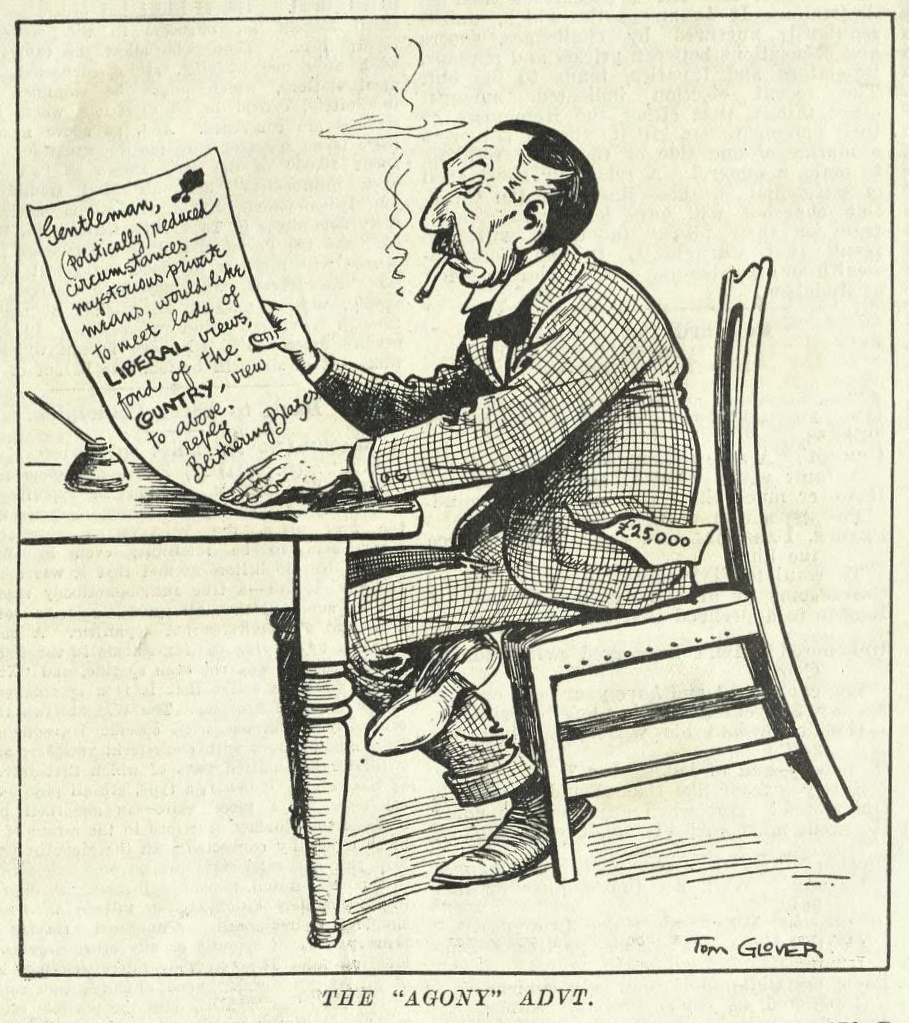
'The "Agony" Advt.' (featuring a caricature of Billy Hughes), published on 28 December 1922.

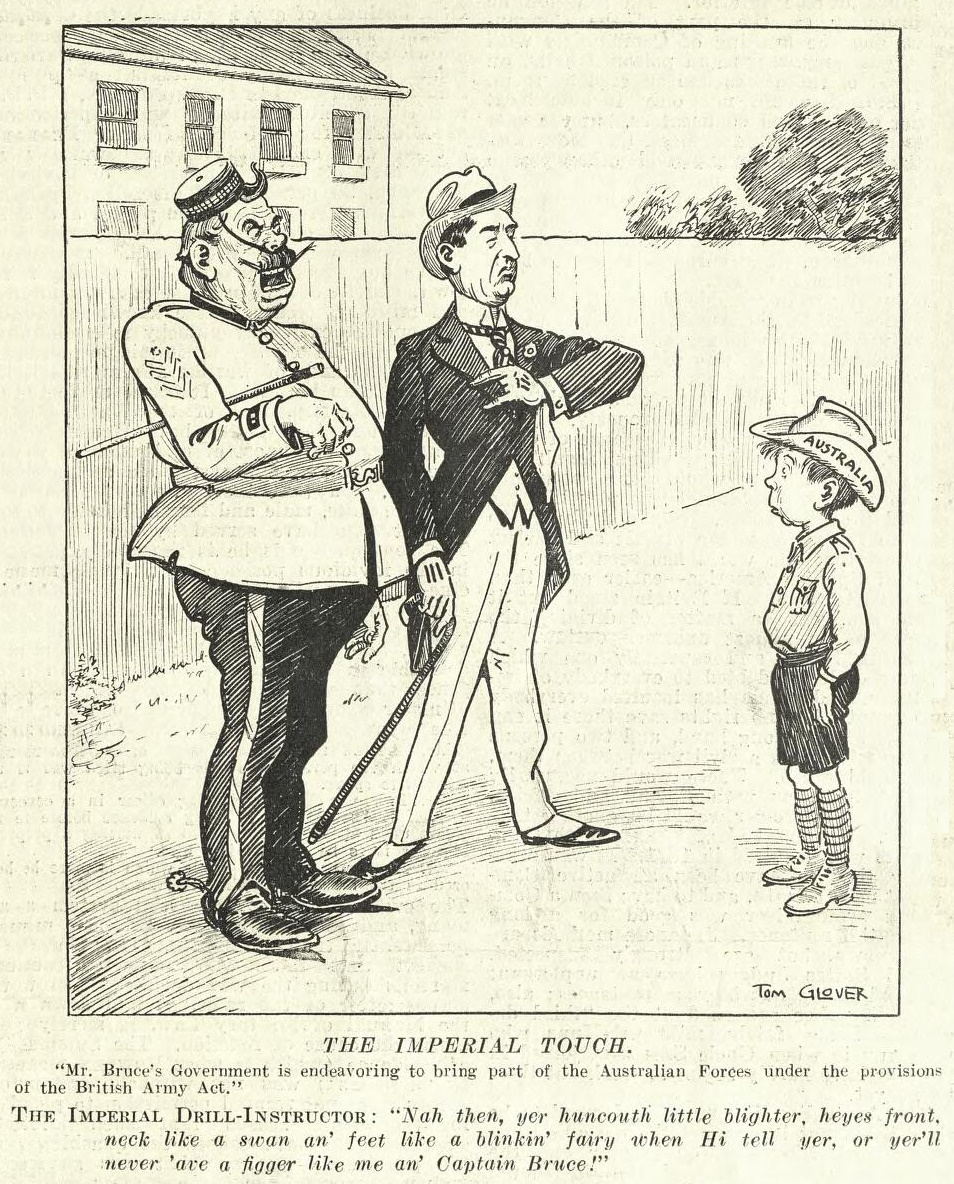
'The Imperial Touch' (featuring a caricature of Stanley Bruce), published on 3 May 1923.

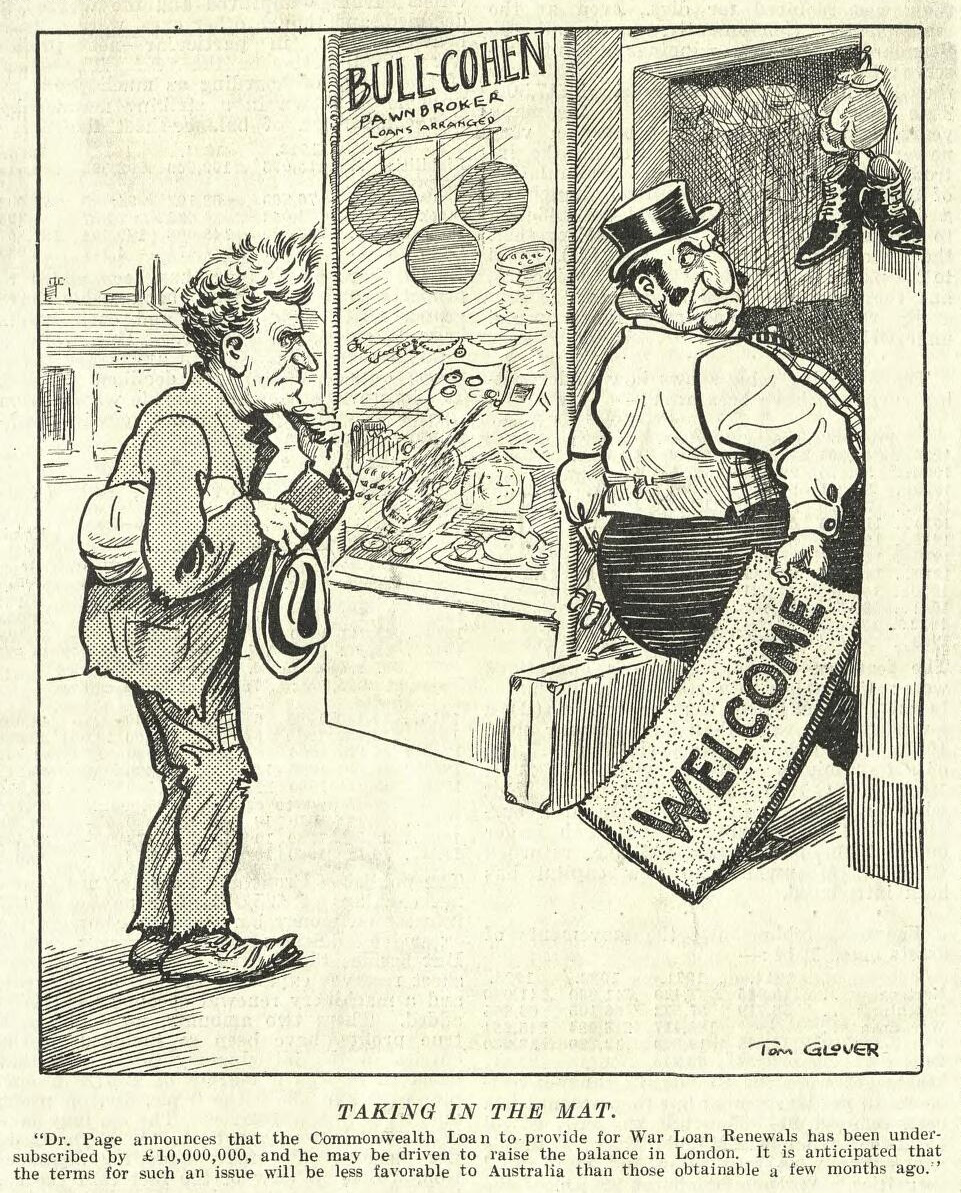
'Taking in the Mat' (featuring a caricature of Earle Page), published on 13 September 1923.

A selection of caricatures of politicians by Tom Glover (each published in The Bulletin).

The political demise of Billy Hughes and the ascendancy of Stanley Bruce was represented as a tragedy for Australian cartoonists, as depicted in Glover's cartoon in The Bulletin of 8 February 1923. Hughes' physical characteristics had been considered to be "God's gift to cartoonists". When Bruce became Prime Minister, according to a satirical article in Sydney's Daily Pictorial, "all over Australia the cartoonists sat dumbly biting their pencils, trying to figure out what they could do with the regular polished countenance of Stanley Melbourne Bruce". It was Glover that "leapt, pencil in hand, into the breach". The Bulletin artist solved the problem by representing him as "a blase, supercilious, spatted figure [who] strutted with a grand air of dignified aloofness across the boards that [Hughes] had vacated". In December 1926 it was reported that the Australian Prime Minister, Stanley Bruce, had a "very fine private collection" of Australian art, including a set the original artwork of cartoons of himself by Tom Glover.

In March 1923 a full-page cartoon by Glover represented the cartoonist's anxiety of having to produce humorous material on a regular basis.

In May 1923 Glover was amongst a small group of black-and-white artists who contributed to the Dancey Memorial Exhibition of over 200 artists at the Victorian Artists' Society rooms in Albert Street, East Melbourne. A journalist reporting on the exhibition in The Bulletin commented that the drawings by the black-and-white artists "made a good show, but their generally fresh work was largely ignored by investors, who showed a preference for any old tripe in oils or water-colours".

In the Bulletin of 5 May 1927, on the occasion of the opening of Parliament House in Canberra, a cartoon by Tom Glover spanning two pages featured caricatures of leading politicians and parliamentary officials. A limited number of copies of the drawing, printed on art paper, was made available from the Bulletin office at a cost of one shilling each.

=== The Sun ===
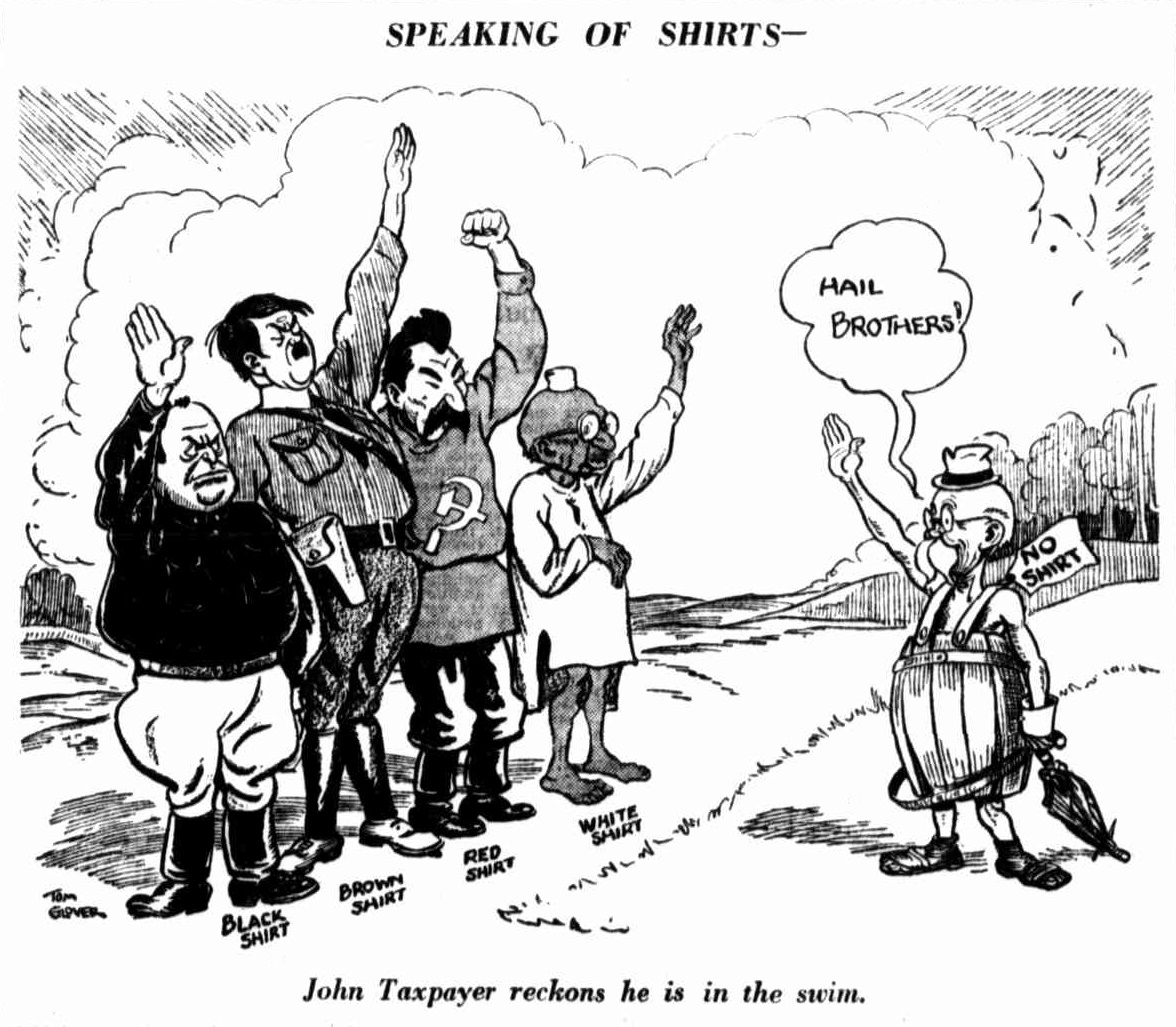
'Speaking of Shirts', published in The Sun (Sydney), 25 June 1933 (including caricatures of Mussolini, Hitler, Stalin and Gandhi).

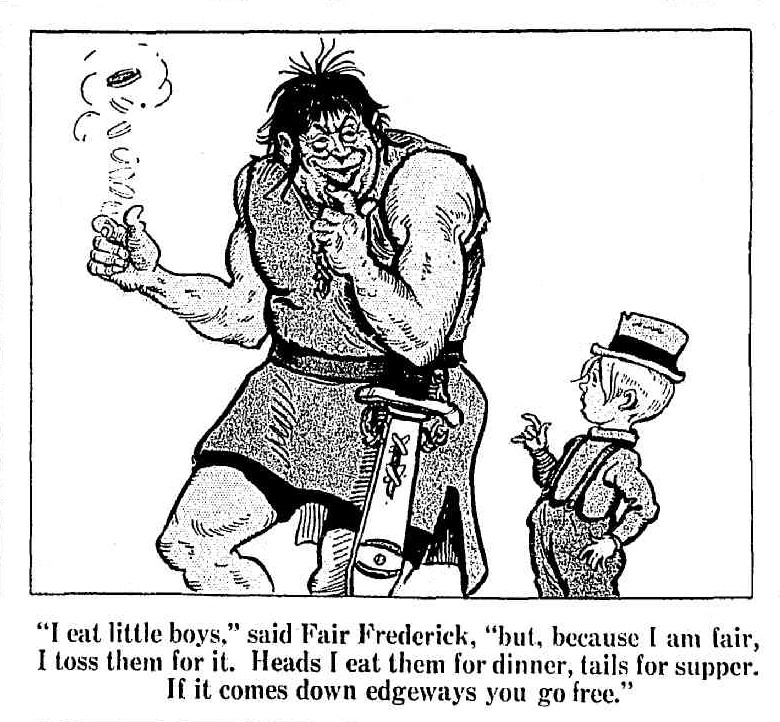
Glover's title character is confronted by a giant (a panel from Skeeter in Fairyland published in The Sun, 6 January 1935).

In early 1928 Glover left The Bulletin to take up a position as the feature cartoonist for The Sun newspaper in Sydney. A new cartoon by Glover was published each day in the pages of The Sun, beginning on 5 March 1928. Glover's cartoons were also reproduced in The Newcastle Sun newspaper.

Through the pages of The Sun Glover's caricatures and commentary on politics, society and topical news-stories became an institution. His portrayal of 'John Citizen' or 'John Taxpayer' was a character representing the average man. The figure, moustachioed and wearing a hat, made frequent appearances in Glover's cartoons.

In August 1933 Glover's comic-strip for children called Skeeter in Fairyland commenced in the Sunday edition of The Sun. The Skeeter comic-strip was published each Sunday in the 'Sunbeams' children's supplement of The Sun. In September 1935 the strip was renamed Skeeter and His Magic Ring. The comic-strip continued to be published under Glover's name after his death in September 1938. From April 1939 the Skeeter comic-strip was attributed to Stuart Peterson, with the final instalment appearing in the 7 January 1940 edition.

Glover was an "ardent walker [who] invariably spent week-ends in a hatless ramble of anything up to thirty miles a day". He was also "a keen beach fisherman". In a tribute after his death in 1938, Glover was described as "a considerate kindly man who loved mankind, the bush, the birds – all nature".

=== Death ===
On 7 September 1938 Glover suddenly collapsed in his office at The Sun and died, aged 47, before medical help arrived.

Glover's remains were cremated at the Northern Suburbs crematorium at North Ryde. It was reported that Glover's funeral was attended by "nearly 200 mourners", with the artistic and journalistic community of Sydney being "widely represented". One account stated that the former Prime Minister Billy Hughes was amongst the mourners, "a sad little figure who felt Tom's passing keenly".

== Publications ==
- Tom Glover (1932), Ow Zat!: Souvenir of the 1932-3 Tests, Sydney: Angus & Robertson.
- H. V. Horden (1932), Googlies: Coals From a Test-cricketer's Fireplace, Sydney: Angus & Robertson (illustrated by Tom Glover).

== Gallery ==
A selection of images by Tom Glover
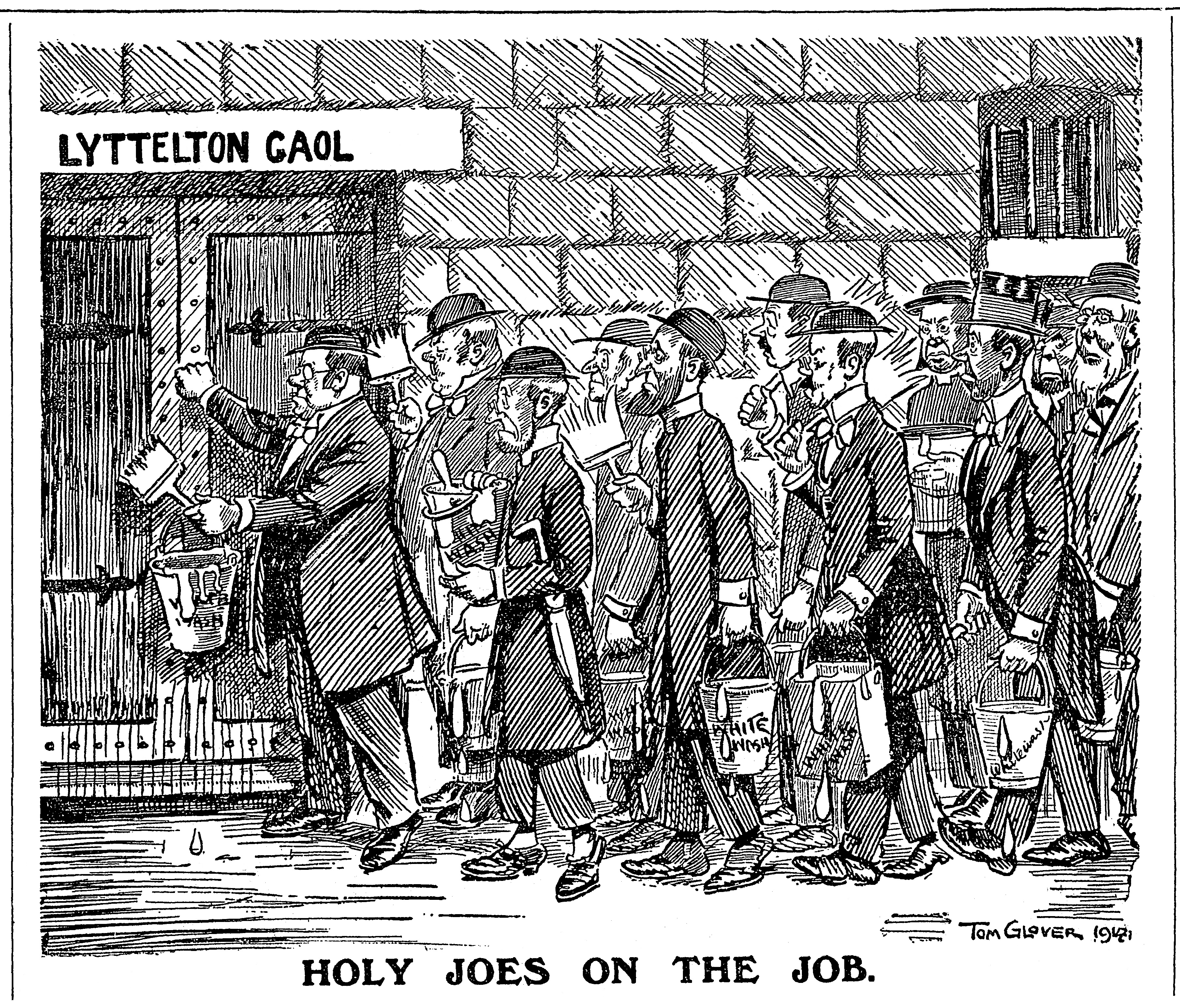
'Holy Joes on the Job', New Zealand Truth, 26 September 1914.

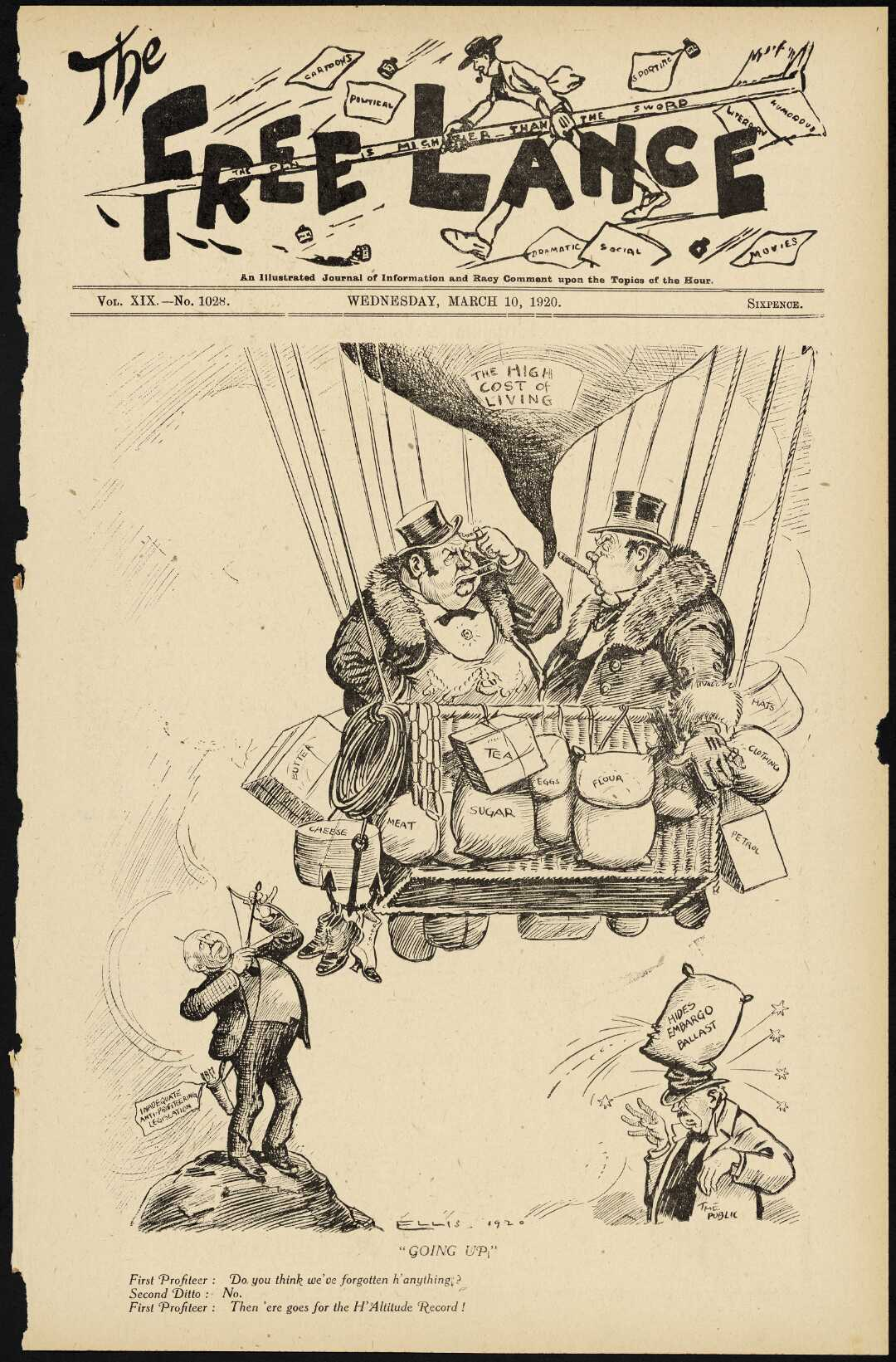
'The high cost of living', cartoon by Tom Glover ('Ellis') on the front page of The Free Lance, 10 March 1920.

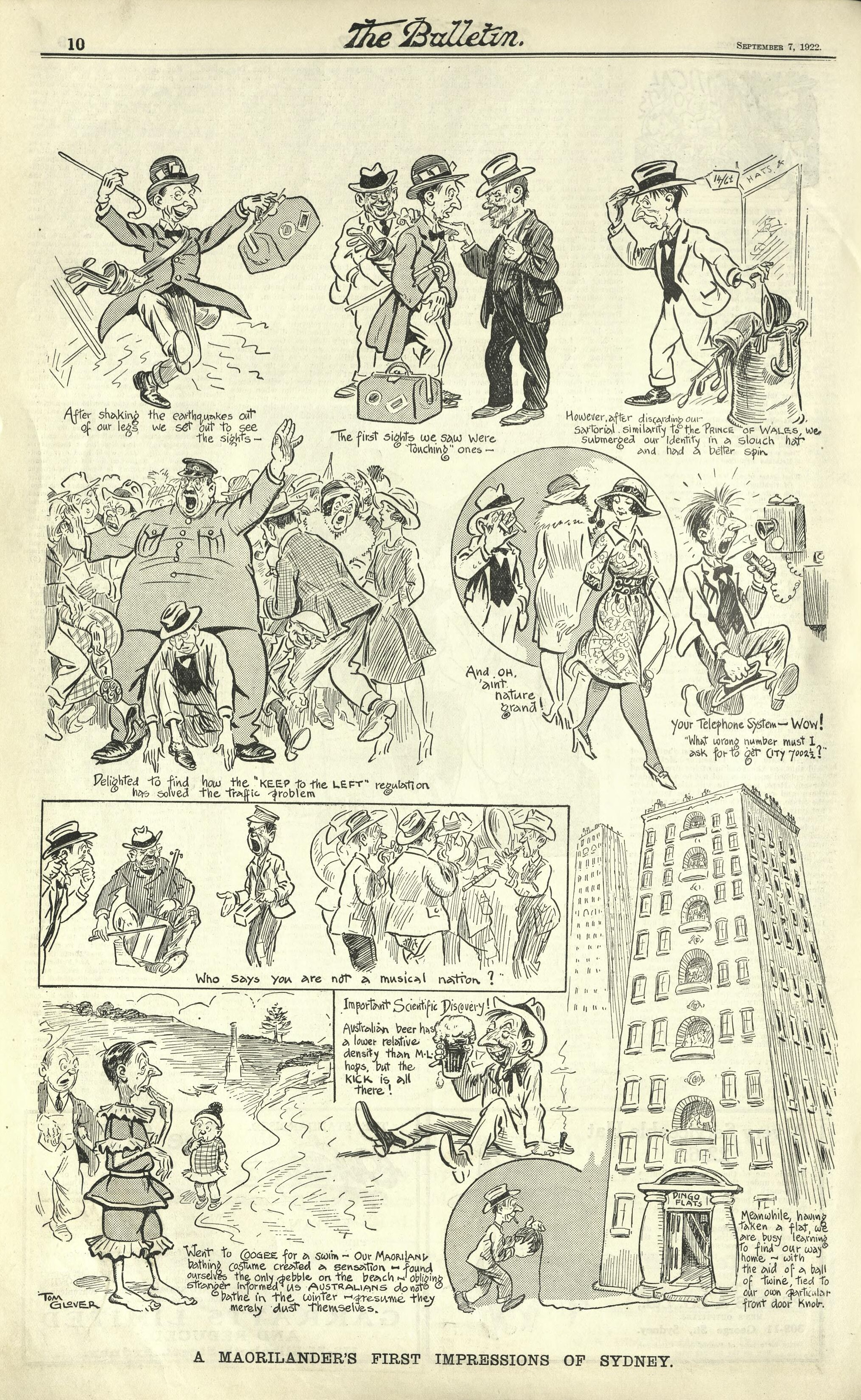
'A Maorilander's First Impression of Sydney', The Bulletin (Sydney), 7 September 1922.

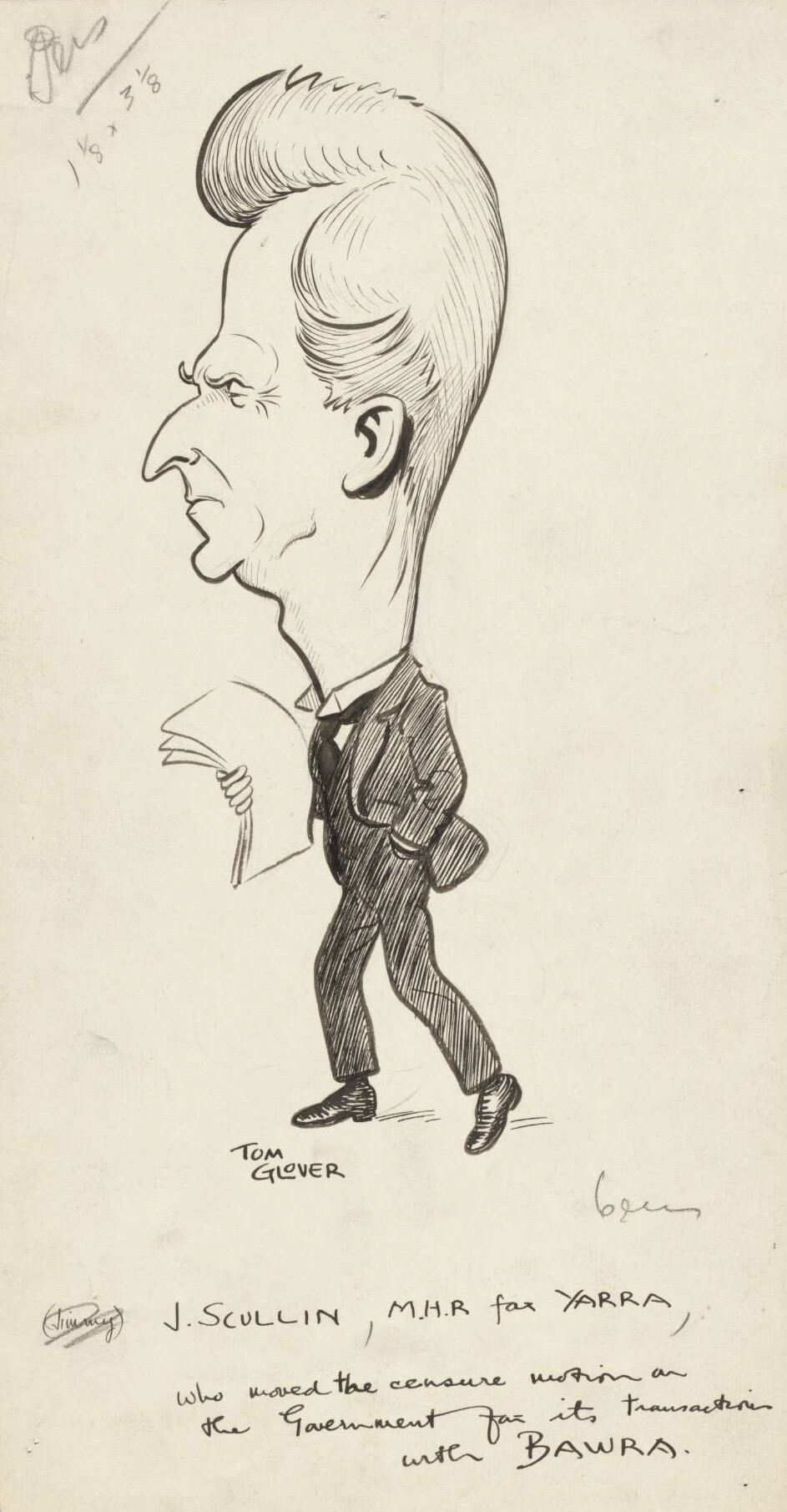
1924 caricature of James Scullin, M.H.R. for Yarra.

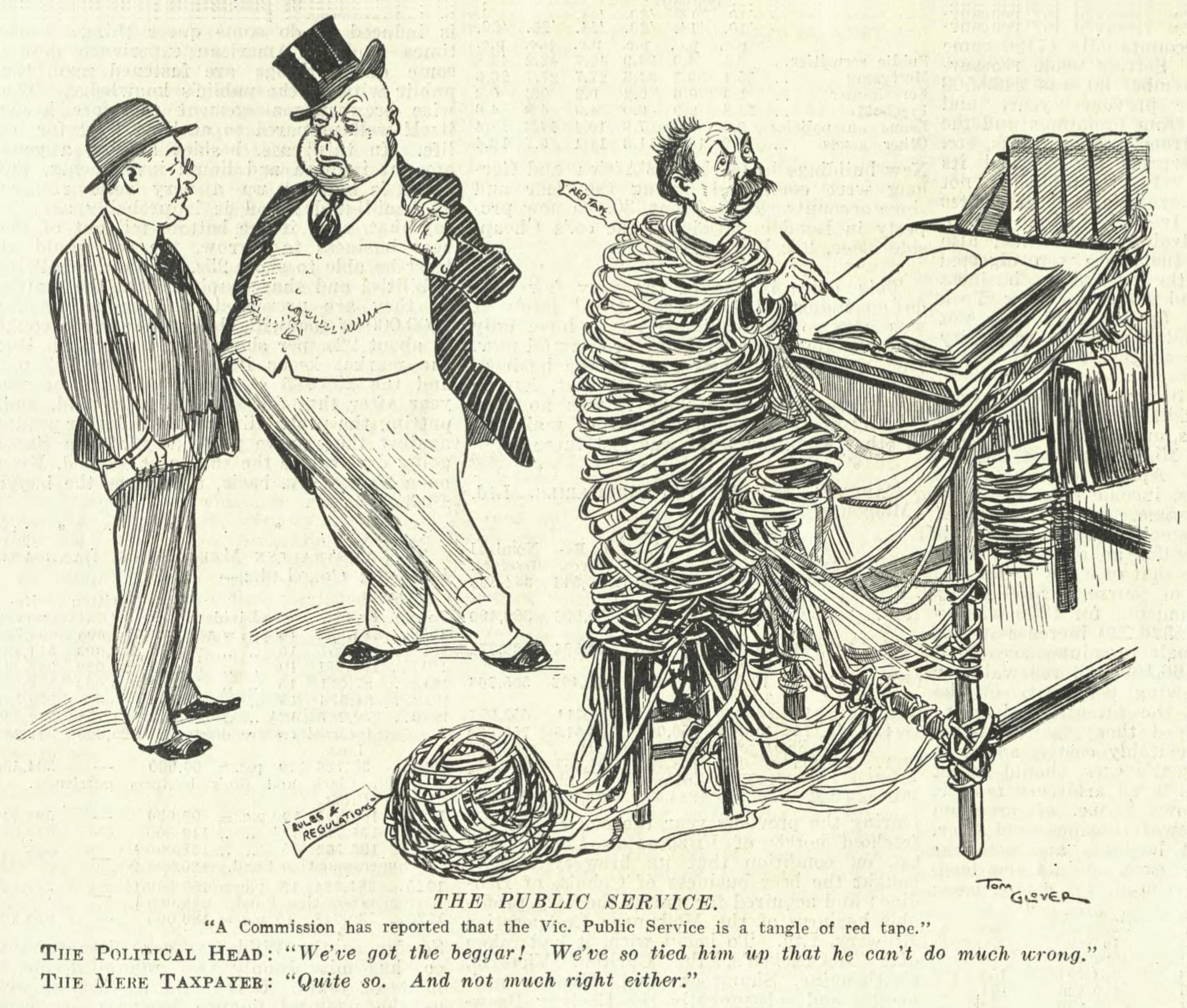
'The Public Service', published in The Bulletin, 13 January 1927.

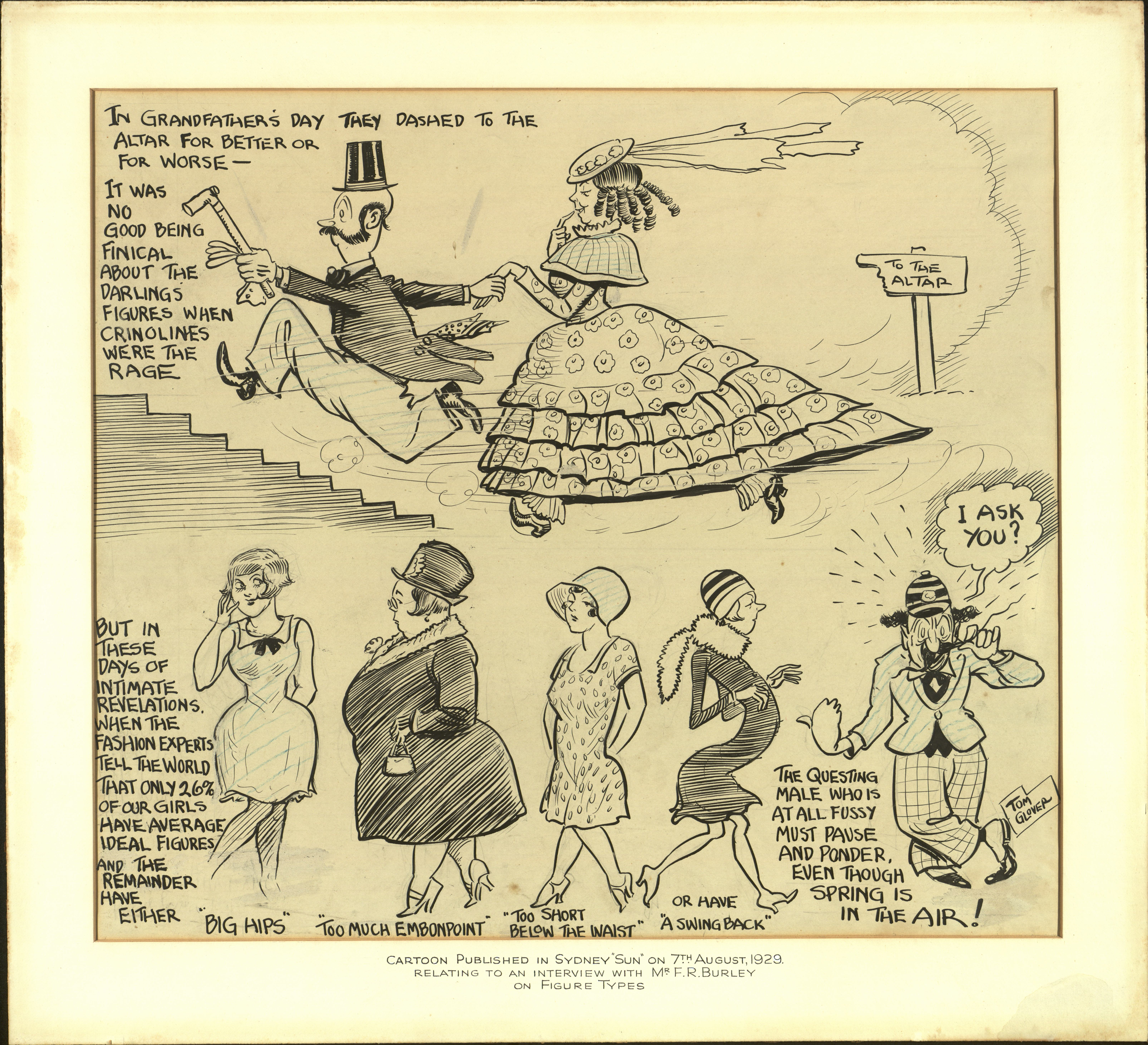
Cartoon published in The Sun on 7 August 1929, accompanying an interview with Frederick Burley, founder of the Berlei company.

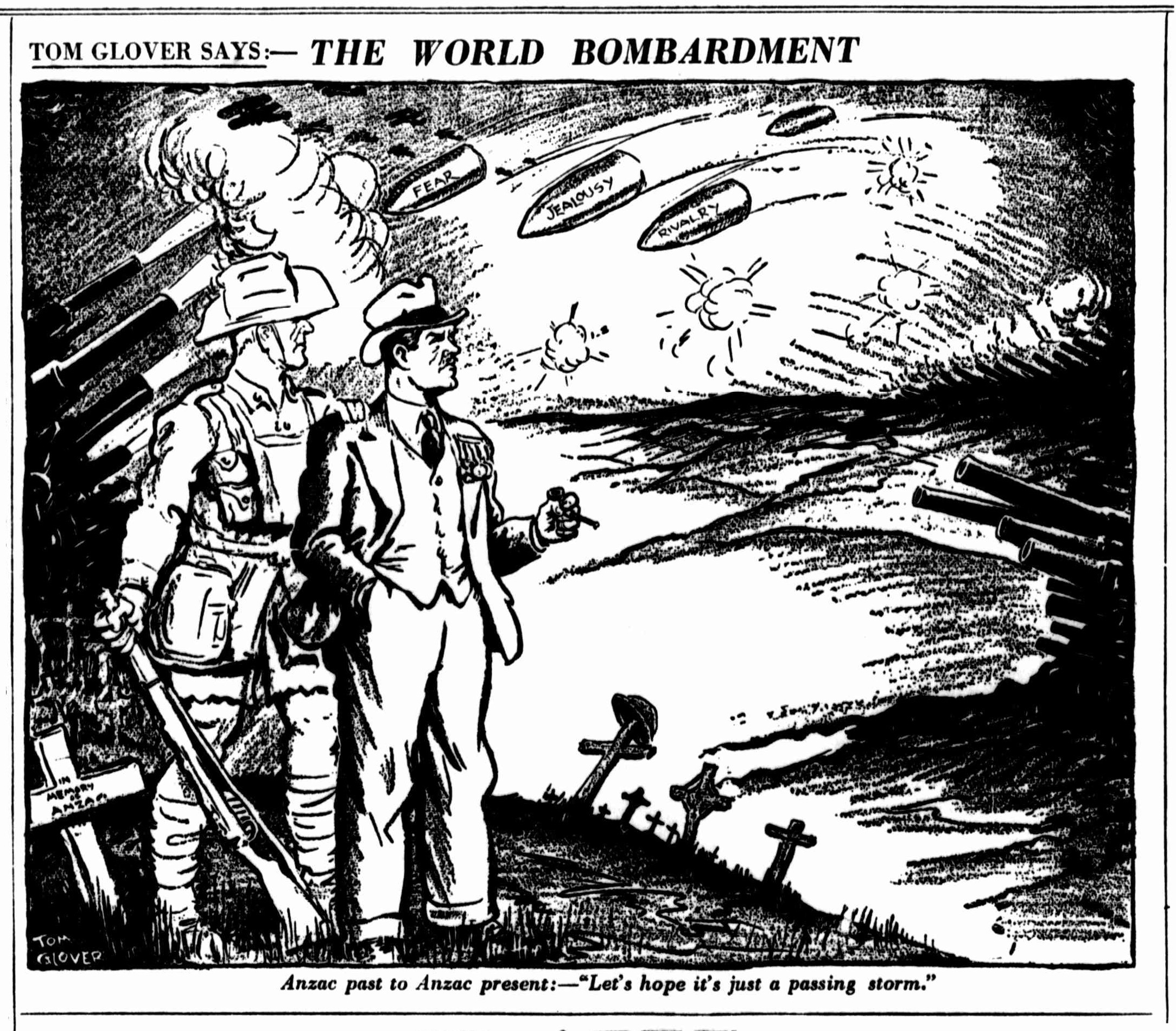
'The World Bombardment', The Sun, 26 April 1936; "Anzac past to Anzac present:— 'Let's hope it's just a passing storm'".
