= Andrew Moore (historian) =

Australian historian

Andrew Moore (born 1953) is an Australian historian and academic, a specialist in Australian right-wing politics. He has taught at the University of Sydney, The University of New South Wales, England's University of Lincoln and the University of Western Sydney. His areas of expertise include Twentieth Century Australian History, Irish-Australian history and social history of sport, especially rugby league football. Moore is a leading expert on both the New Guard and the Old Guard.

== Academic career ==
Andrew Moore has been teaching Australian history since 1985 and currently teaches at the University of Western Sydney, where he is an associate professor in the faculty of Humanities and Communication Arts. Moore graduated from Macquarie University with a Bachelor of arts and a diploma of education. He also holds a PhD from La Trobe University.

Moore has worked on multiple projects with the University of Western Sydney as well as The Australian Research Council (ARC). The university has funded two of Andrew Moore’s papers, Mr Big, Mr Wig and the Neo-Nazi: the Browne Fitzpatrick Affair and Privilege Case, 1955 and Biographical Registrar of the Australian Labour Movement 1788–1975. He has been funded by the ARC to construct a historical biography of approximately 1200 members of the Old and New Guard. He is also a member of the New South Wales working party of the Australian Dictionary of Biography and has been affiliated since 1991. Moore has also worked with the Australian Society for Sports History (ASSH) and their sub-group the Tom Brock Bequest Committee. He has also given the 1st Tom Brock Lecture in 1999 as well and has written an introductory essay for the book collection of Tom Brock lectures. Since 2005 he has become a chairman for the Tom Brock Bequest Committee. Moore has written over 70 papers, articles, and book chapters.

Moore is currently a principal supervisor for doctoral projects and is currently supervising a thesis titled The Political Economy of the Australian Mining Industry, 1945–2010. He has expressed the opinion that universities should support and fund the research passion projects of their teaching staff.

Andrew Moore is a member of the federal executive of the Australian Society for the Study of Labour History and has been so since 1986. He is also an associate editor for their peer-reviewed journal Labour History published by Liverpool University Press.

== Irish-Australian history ==
One of Andrew Moore's specialisations is Irish-Australian history, with a focus on Irish-Australian figures such as the famous Francis De Groot. Although most of his writings and lectures in this field are about Francis de Groot, Moore also has focused on other Australian-Irish figures. He has held a seminar on Australian-Irish rebel Phil Cunningham at Blacktown City Council.

Andrew Moore has written the biographical work "Francis De Groot: Irish Fascist Australian Legend". The book was funded by the Sesquicentenary of Responsible Government in NSW Committee. It was shortlisted for the State Library of NSW's Australian History Prize in 2006. The book details the life of Sir Francis de Groot from his early life in Ireland to his leadership of the New Guard in Australia.

The book had a mixed range of reception, with some criticisms from both the academic field and from general critics. He has been criticised for his labelling of Francis de Groot as fascist. This criticism has come from both Sydney Morning Herald columnist Gerald Henderson and Senior Lecturer of politics at Deakin University Geoff Robinson, as both have disagreed with Moore's labelling. Moore's overuse of acronyms when discussing De Groot's career in the New Guard has also been criticised by Canberra writer Frank O'Shea.

However, there has also been positive reception of the book. Moore himself has been described as having the "…rare skill in distinguishing facts from fictions…" by political historian Geoff Robinson. Historian Michael Cathcart of the University of Melbourne has also appraised the book and Moore, calling the book "..a dignified work of patient scholarship and unexpected insights." Cathcart also has argued against Gerald Henderson's critique of the label of fascist, claiming that Moore writes a character that is more than predictable left-wing judgements.

In 2004, he found Francis De Groot's Cavalry officer's sword in Ireland after giving a talk on Australian-Irish history at the University of Dublin and was returned to the National Museum of Australia.

== Australian right-wing political history ==
Australian right-wing political history is one of Moore’s primary field of study, with his expertise being the Old Guard and the New Guard paramilitary organisations. Moore's works have covered extreme Australian fascist movements and organisations to the documentation of the Labour party members and anti-Communist historians. Moore himself has alluded to not identifying as fascist or associating politically with right-wing political groups.

He has also written about the historiography of Australian right-wing political history, namely through analysis of archival evidence. A major contribution of Andrew Moore to this field is his article Writing About the Extreme Right in Australia. It is an introductory essay to the 89th issue of Labour History that held a thematic section titled The 'Extreme Right' in Twentieth Century Australia. It is one of the most prominent sources of academic papers on Labour history and historiography. Moore has also written a biographical piece about anti-communist historian Malcolm Ellis, whose papers are held in the Malcolm Ellis collection at the National Library of Australia. Moore's essay "The 'historical expert': M.H. Ellis and the historiography of the cold war" is a further analysis of Malcolm Ellis's life, examining his anti-communist views and their relationship to his work as an Australian historian.

His first book was The Secret Army and the Premier Conservative Paramilitary Organisations in New South Wales which detailed and analysed the actions of the Old and New Guard under Jack Lang's second term as premier. Academic John McCarthy from UNSW said the book was "meticulously researched and tightly argued". McCarthy also notes that the general reader may disagree with some of Moore's argument.

The work has also received negative reception, with historian Richard Evans writing the article "'A Menace to this Realm': The New Guard and the New South Wales Police, 1931–32" that criticises Moore's book. The critique suggests that Moore's work is flawed, and his argument on the Old Guard is a dominant view of the political history of New South Wales that Moore has led. Moore himself has responded to the criticism and defended his work in the paper Superintendent Mackay and the Curious Case of The Vanishing Secret Army.

== Australian sport history ==
Andrew Moore has contributed to the historical field of Australian social sport mainly through his writings on Australian Rugby League, with also a brief contribution to the history of Australian motorsports. He has worked with the ASSH as a contributing writer and editor of their book Centenary Reflections: 100 years of Rugby League in Australia.

Moore's specialisation in the field of Australian Rugby League history is mainly on the history of the North Sydney Bears. Moore's work The Mighty Bears!: A social history of North Sydney Rugby League details why the club has been so unsuccessful, as well as analysing the relationship of Australian Rugby League with the rise of the working class. Fellow Tom Brock lecturer Charles Little critically acclaimed this work on its exploration of how women were treated in the club and how the introduction of licences to sell liquor affected its working class demographic. Greg Mallory from the University of Queensland also reviewed the book, praising it for its reinterpretation of the club's history by discussing the impact of popular culture on the club. Mallory also mentions that the book is unique for its discussion of racism in the club's history, and how its development is tied to larger cultural movements in Australia. Statistician David Middleton also contributed to the book through his compilation of the club records from 1908 to 1995.

In Andrew Moore's “Opera of the Proletariat: Rugby League, the Labour Movement and Working-Class Culture in New South Wales and Queensland” he continues a similar analysis of political Australian history and its relationship with Rugby League in NSW.

== Publications ==
=== Books ===
- Aintree Down Under: Warwick Farm and the Golden Age of Australian Motor Sport., Walla Walla Press 9781876718268, (2017).
- Mr Big of Bankstown: The Scandalous Fitzpatrick and Browne Affair., UWA Publishing 9781742582788, (2011).
- Francis de Groot. Irish Fascist Australian Legend., Federation Press 1862875731, (2005).
- The Mighty Bears!: a Social History of North Sydney Rugby League., Pan Macmillan Australia, (1996).
- The Right Road?: A History of Right-wing Politics in Australia., Oxford University Press, (1995).
- The Secret Army and the Premier: Conservative Paramilitary Organisations in New South Wales 1930–32., New South Wales University Press 0868402834 (1989).

=== Chapters in books ===
- "The Nazification of the New Guard: Colonel Campbell's Fascist Odyssey", in National Socialism in Oceania, Peter Lang 978363156355, (2010).
- "Whither the Squirrel Grip? A Decade of Lectures on the 'Greatest Game of all'", in Tales from Coathanger City, Australian Society for Sports History 9780733429330, (2010).
- "Jimmy Devereux's Yorkshire Pudding: Reflections on the Origins of Rugby League in New South Wales and Queensland.", in Tales from Coathanger City, Australian Society for Sports History 9780733429330, (2010).
- "Alex Buzo and Norfs: With Thanks and in Appreciation", in Centenary Reflections: 100 Years of Rugby League in Australia, Australian Academic Press Pty Ltd 9780980481525, (2008).
- "Interpreting 100 Years of Rugby League", in Centenary Reflections: 100 Years of Rugby League in Australia, Australian Academic Press Pty Ltd 9780980481525. (2008).
- "Henry Emanuel Cohen, 1902–05", in Laying the Foundations of Industrial Justice, Federation Press 1862874638, (2003).
- "Stanley Cassin Taylor 1942–1966", in Laying the Foundations of Industrial Justice, Federation Press 1862874638, (2003).
- "Fascism in Interwar Australia", co-authored with Perkins, J., in Fascism outside Europe: the European impulse against domestic conditions in the diffusion of global fascism, Social Sciences Monographs/ Columbis University Press 0880339888, (2001).

=== Journal articles ===
- "The apostasy of Allan Fraser: the ALP and civil liberties in 1955", Labour History, no 103, pp 187 – 202, (2012).
- "Discredited fascism: the New Guard after 1932", Australian Journal of Politics and History, vol 57, no 2, pp 188 – 206, (2011).
- "Eric Olthwaite and the demise of the North Sydney Bears", Sporting Traditions, vol 27, no 1, pp 19 – 36, (2010).
- "Loyal lieutenant or spy?: Frank De Groot and the intelligence services", Journal of the Royal Australian Historical Society, vol 96, no 2, pp 201 – 220, (2010).
- "A mace to swat two blow-flies: interpreting the Fitzpatrick and Browns Privilege Case", Australian Journal of Politics and History, vol 55, no 1, pp 32 – 45, (2009).
- "Red devils and white reaction: Jack Fegan and the workers defence corps of the 1930s", Journal of Australian Studies, vol 33, no 2, pp 165 – 179, (2009).
- "Superintendent MacKay and the curious case of the vanishing secret army", History Australia, vol 6, no 3, pp 721 – 7214, (2009).
- "A Bill of Rights for Australia? Ask Frank Browne", Overland, vol 190, pp 41 – 45, (2008).
- "Mr. Big, the Big Fella and the split: fault lines in Bankstown's Labor politics, 1955", Labour History, vol 95, pp 197 – 212, (2008).
- "Writing about the Extreme Right in Australia", ex Labour History, vol 89, pp 1 – 15, (2005).
- "The New Guard and the Labour Movement", 1931–35', Labour History, vol 89, pp 55 – 72, (2005).
- "From the Strand to Boorooloola: M.H. Ellis as pioneer motorist", Journal of Australian Studies, vol 81, pp 83 – 92, (2004).
- "The Great Literary Witch-Hunt revisited: Politics, Personality and Picque at the CLF, 1952", Labour History, vol 82, pp 81 – 95, (2002).
- "Another Wild Colonial Boy? Francis de Groot and the Harbour Bridge", Australian Journal of Irish Studies, vol 2, pp 135 – 148, (2002).
- “The ‘Historical Expert’: M.H. Ellis and the Historiography of the Cold War.” Australian historical studies 31, no. 114, 91–109, (2000).
- "Opera of the Proletariat: Rugby League, the Labour Movement and Working-Class Culture in New South Wales and Queensland.", Labour History, no. 79, 57-70, (2000).

=== Conference papers ===
"Activists in Aggregate: Collective Biography, Labour History, and the Biographical Register of the Australian Labour Movement 1788–1975", co-hosted by Rittau, Y. and Shields, J., Labour History and its people, Canberra, (2011).

"Workers and the New Guard. Proletarian Fascism in New South Wales", Eighth National Labour History Conference, Griffith University, Brisbane, (2003).

=== Other ===
“Collective Biography and Labour History: The Case of The Biographical Register of the Australian Labour Movement, 1788-1975.”, Business and Labour History Group, (2009).
