= Unemployed Workers Movement =

Australian Socialist Organisation

- Leader: Jack Sylvester
- Founded: 1930; 96 years ago
- Dates active: c. 1930–1932
- Dissolved: 1932; 94 years ago
- Merged into: United Front Councils of Employed and Unemployed Workers
- Country: Australia
- Allegiance: Communist Party of Australia
- Headquarters: Redfern, New South Wales
- Newspaper: Workers Weekly (unofficial)
- Active regions: Eastern states of Australia
- Ideology: Socialism; United Front

The Unemployed Workers Movement (UWM) was a socialist activist organisation operating in Australia during the Great Depression. It advocated for expanded Welfare, and protections for the Unemployed and fought against evictions in working-class neighbourhoods and work for welfare schemes. In 1930 the UWM had an estimated 30,000 members.

== History ==
An Anti-Eviction March in Sydney, 1931.

During the Great Depression in Australia, unemployment rose rapidly, reaching a height of 32 per cent in 1932. It is estimated that around 60,000 Australians dependeded on Government assistance. Such assistance however was often inadequate or in the form of couponthatch could not pay rent. Additionally "Work for the Dole" schemes prevented many from receiving support. In Sydney, over 6484 Eviction orders were sent out between 1934 and 1939, while in Melbourne 16,000 "ejectment" warrants were filed.

The Unemployed Workers Movement was formed in Melbourne in April 1930 after a dispute between the Victorian Trades Hall Council and a group of unemployed workers who demanded the council represent their interests. Having been rejected, these unemployed activists supported by the Communist Party of Australia founded the UWM. The Foundation of the UWM was part of a larger campaign by the CPA to create mass organisations to radicalise Australian Workers, these organisations were not explicitly Communist and in the case of the UWM, Communists were only a minority of members.

From its inception, the UWM pledged itself against evictions. Specifically in the first major conference of the UWM in July, 1930 their sixth demand stated: "Organise vigilance committees in neighbourhoods to patrol working-class districts and resist by mass action the eviction of unemployed workers from their houses, or attempts on behalf of bailiffs to remove furniture, or gas men to shut off the gas supply."

In 1931 the UWM began expanding as a national organisation, forming new branches in Redfern, Newtown, Balmain, Leichhardt, Bankstown, Parramatta, Granville, Hurstville, Kogarah, Bondi, Paddington, Glebe, Crows Nest, Chatswood and Surry Hills and Newcastle.

Across both Melbourne and Sydney the UWM would engage in actions to prevent evictions from 1930 to 1932. Despite its allegiance to the CPA, the UWM would on multiple occasions defy party lines, mostly when working alongside ALP Organisations on a community level to prevent evictions. The UWM did continue to have friction with Trade halls as they were refused representation in Trade union organisations, this manifested in the UWM disrupting Trade Union meetings and marches.

Increasingly confrontational and violent battles would take place between UWM and allies and the New South Wales Police Force from 1931 to 1932. Such 'battles' took place in Redfern, Leichhardt, Bankstown and Newtown, while the UWM claimed some victories, they were often defeated some of which included exchanges of gunfire. By February 1932, the UWM had won over 200 Eviction cases. During celebrations, a UWM rally was ambushed by members of the New Guard, causing a riot that resulted in the victory of UWM and WDC members.

By the end of 1932 the UWM was merged with other Tenant rights organisations into the United Front Councils of Employed and Unemployed Workers which abandoned its militant methods and eviction campaigns.

== Activities ==
After the UWM commitment to combat evictions, UWM branches created individual "Anti-Eviction Committees" through which they coordinated opposition. The Committees would investigate each case of eviction and decide if to lend their support.

If the UWM Branch decided to intervene, multiple methods were used to prevent eviction. UWM leaders would meet with property owners, alongside a protest held at the property, this sometimes included veiled threats of violence. If deputation failed, the UWM utilised picketing which according to Nadia Wheatley was "familiar to trade unionists, and it fitted the sociable nature of the unemployed movement." If picketing on the footpath failed, picketers would move into the house. If evictions were successful, UWM would dump evicted furniture in front of a city's town hall or police station. Men, women and children would all contribute to UWM activities. In these activities the UWM were often assisted by members of the Workers Defence Corps and supporters of the Australian Labor Party.

On multiple occasions, UWM protests turned into brawls with police attempting to fulfil eviction orders. With UWM members armed with rocks, metal bars, bricks and bottles. Houses would be barricaded with furniture, sandbags and barbed wire.

The UWM tactics were extremely successful, winning every eviction case they supported in Sydney in the first five months of 1931, and continuing to have an extremely high success rate.
