= 1932 New South Wales constitutional crisis =

Political event in Australia

- Date: 13 May 1932
- Location: Government House, Sydney, Parliament House, Sydney
- Participants: Sir Philip Game, Jack Lang, Sir Bertram Stevens
- Outcome: Game dismissed Lang, commissioned Stevens who called a state election which Lang resoundingly lost

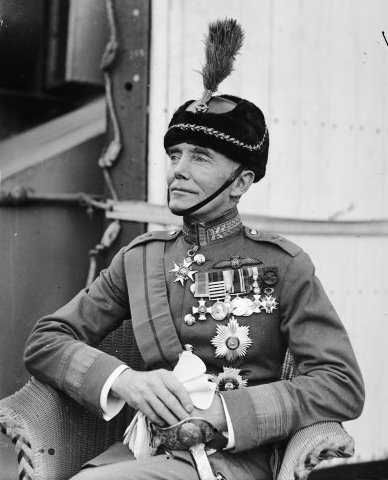
Sir Philip Game 26th Governor of New South Wales.

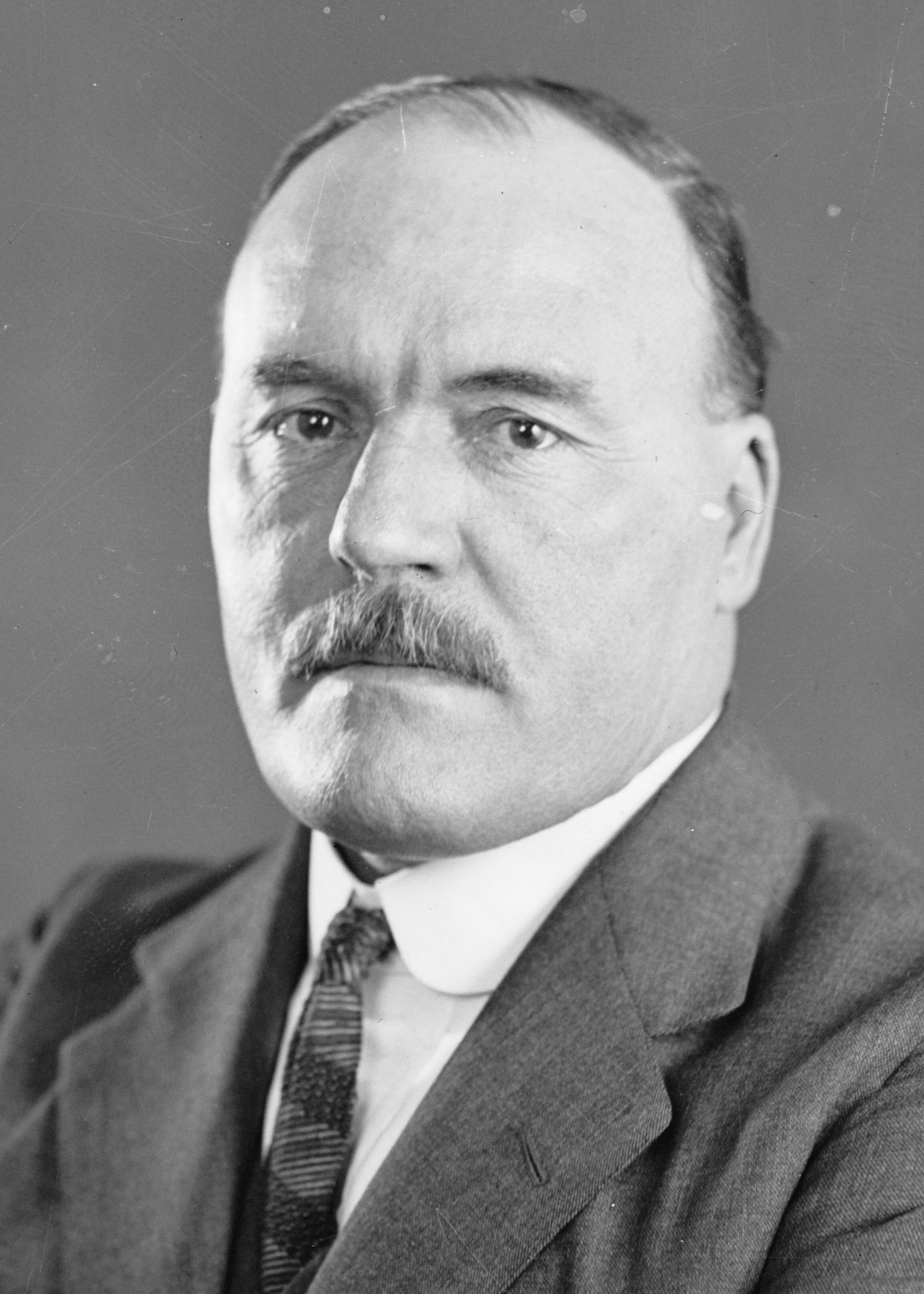
Jack Lang 23rd Premier of New South Wales.

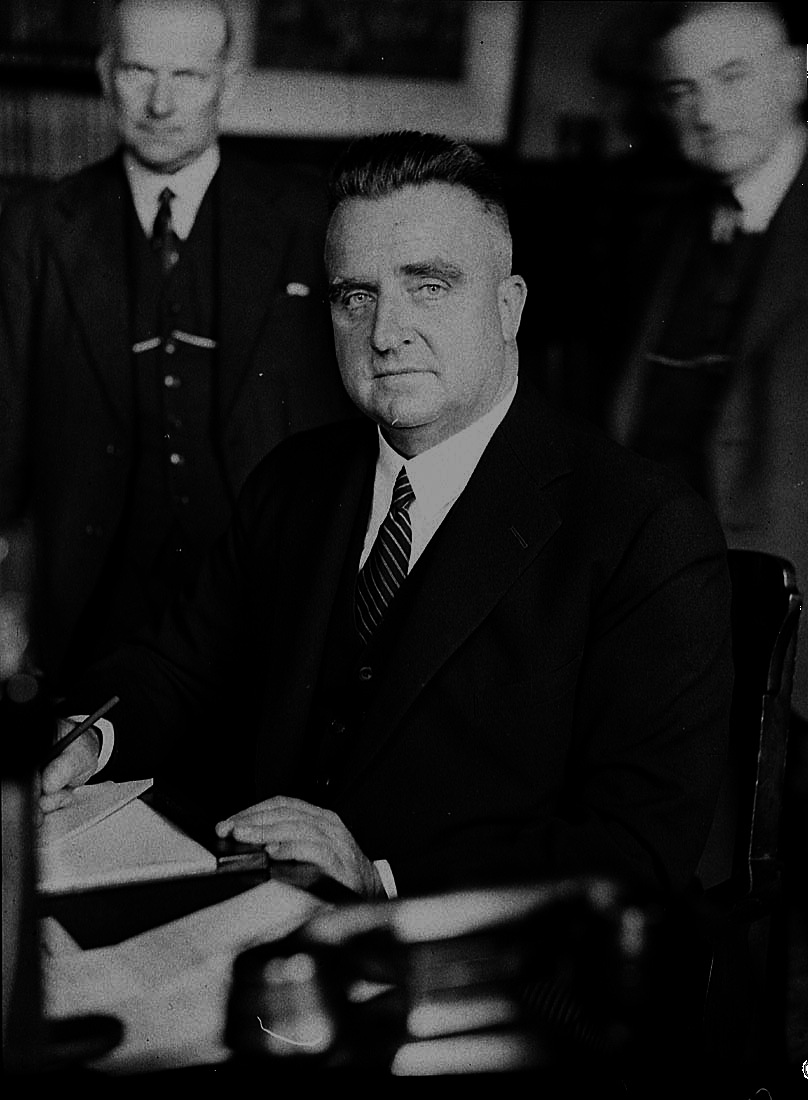
Sir Bertram Stevens 24th Premier of New South Wales.

The 1932 New South Wales constitutional crisis culminated in the dismissal of Jack Lang, the incumbent premier of New South Wales, by state governor Philip Game. Lang remains the only Australian state premier to be removed from office by a governor, using the reserve powers of the Crown. Had Lang not been dismissed, it is strongly suspected that the proto-fascist New Guard planned to depose him in a coup.

== Background ==
Early in 1931, premier Jack Lang released his own plan to combat the Great Depression in Australia, which became known as "the Lang Plan". This was in contrast to the "Melbourne Agreement", later known as the Premiers' Plan, which all other state governments and the federal government had agreed to in 1930. Lang believed that the Depression was caused by overseas bankers who had sought to enrich themselves at the expense of the general populace, and that the deflationary Premiers' Plan would only secure their wealth.

Key points of the Lang Plan included the reduction of interest owed by Australian governments on debts within Australia to 3%, the cancellation of interest payments to overseas bondholders and financiers on government borrowings, the injection of more funds into the nation's money supply as central bank credit for the revitalisation of industry and commerce, and the abolition of the Gold Standard, to be replaced by a "Goods Standard," whereby the amount of currency in circulation would be fixed to the amount of goods produced within the Australian economy. The banks had indicated that if he paid the interest they would advance him an additional amount which was greater than the interest, thus giving him a positive cash flow.

Lang was totally opposed to the Premiers' Plan agreed to by the federal Labor government of James Scullin and the other state premiers, which called for even more stringent cuts to government spending to balance the budget. In October 1931 Lang's followers in the House of Representatives crossed the floor to vote with the conservative United Australia Party (UAP) and bring down the Scullin government. This action split the New South Wales Labor Party in two. Lang's followers became known as Lang Labor, while Scullin's supporters, led by Ben Chifley, became known in New South Wales as Federal Labor. Most of the party's branches and affiliated trade unions supported Lang.

When the UAP government of Joseph Lyons came to power in January 1932, it passed the Financial Agreement Enforcement Act, forcing the New South Wales government to adhere to its debt commitments and to cut government spending. In response, Lang withdrew all the state's funds from government bank accounts and stored the money at the Sydney Trades Hall so that the federal government would be unable to gain access to it. Governor Philip Game advised Lang that in his view this action was illegal, and that if Lang did not reverse it he would be forced to use his reserve vice-regal powers to dismiss Lang and his government, and appoint new ministers who would act lawfully. Lang stood firm, and issued a leaflet in defiance of Game. Reluctantly, Game then summoned Lang to Government House to withdraw his commission as premier. (Note: However, Lang was not the first to hear of his dismissal. The pianist Isador Goodman, who had been befriended by Sir Philip and Lady Game, was at Government House for dinner that night. There were a number of interruptions, and Goodman asked if he perhaps ought to leave. Game replied "No, that's not necessary, you see, I am about to dismiss the Premier".)

Gerald Stone, in his book 1932, states that there is evidence that Lang considered arresting Game to prevent the governor from dismissing him. The possibility of this was sufficiently high that the military forces of the Commonwealth, who would have come to the assistance of the governor, were put on alert.

== Dismissal and result ==
On 13 May 1932, Game sacked Lang and his government. He then appointed UAP leader Bertram Stevens as caretaker Premier. Stevens formed a coalition with Michael Bruxner's Country Party, and immediately called an election at which he defeated Lang's NSW Labor Party in a landslide. Lang's caucus was more than halved, to 24 seats.

This was the first case of an Australian government with the confidence of the lower house of Parliament being dismissed by a vice-regal representative, the second (and as of 2025, most recent) case being when Governor-General Sir John Kerr dismissed Gough Whitlam's government on 11 November 1975.

Game himself felt his decision was the right one, despite his personal liking of Lang. He wrote to his mother-in-law on 2 July 1932: "Still with all his faults of omission and commission I had and still have a personal liking for Lang and a great deal of sympathy for his ideals and I did not at all relish being forced to dismiss him. But I felt faced with the alternative of doing so or reducing the job of Governor all over the Empire to a farce." Lang himself, despite objecting to his dismissal, conceded that he too liked Game, regarding him as fair and polite, and having had good relations with him.

== See also ==
- 1975 Australian constitutional crisis
