= Jack Lang (Australian politician) =

Australian politician (1876–1975)

The Honourable Jack Lang
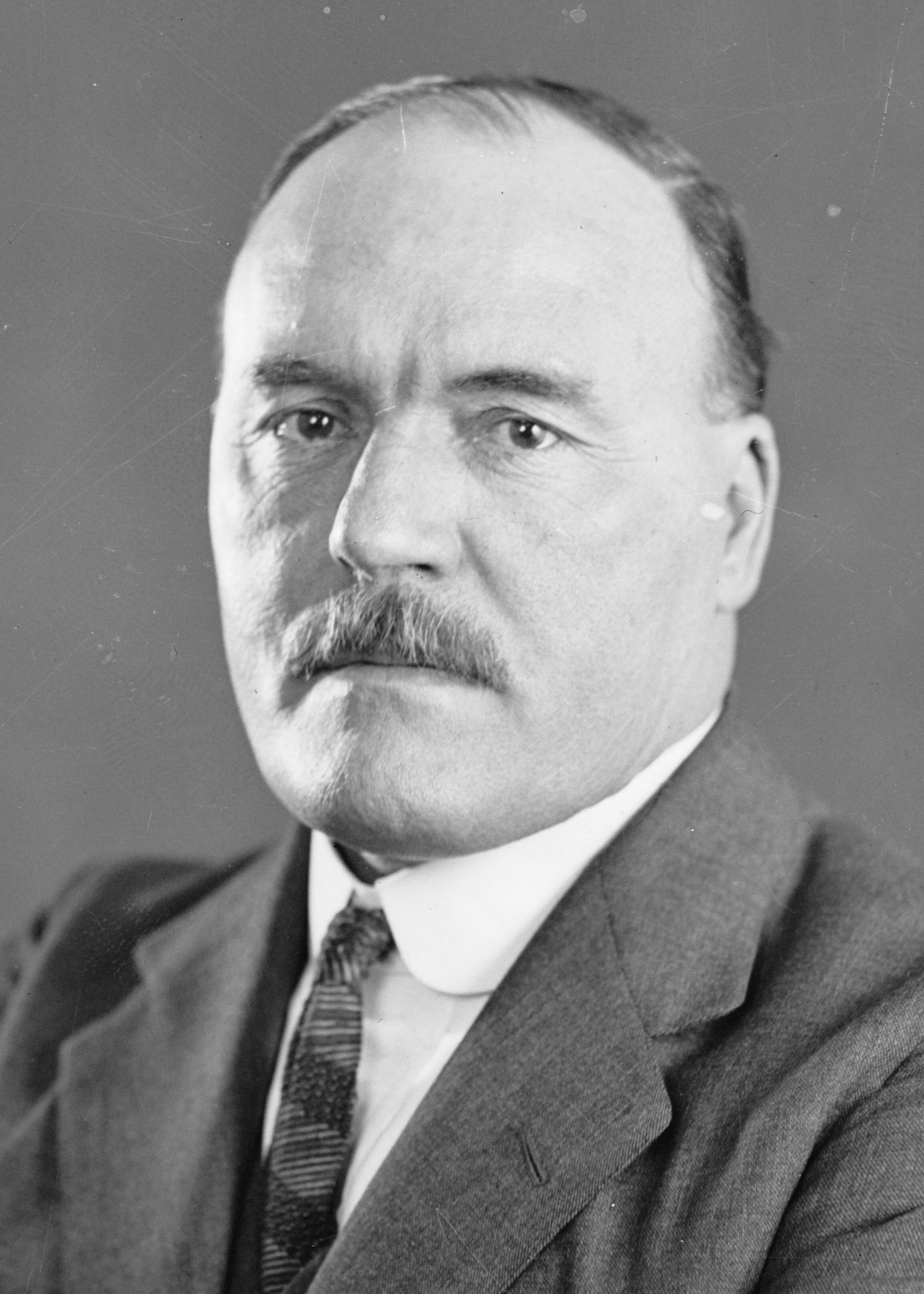
- Lang in 1925

23rd Premier of New South Wales
- In office 4 November 1930 – 16 May 1932
- Monarch: George V
- Governor: Philip Game
- Preceded by: Thomas Bavin
- Succeeded by: Bertram Stevens
- In office 17 June 1925 – 18 October 1927
- Monarch: George V
- Governor: Dudley de Chair
- Preceded by: George Fuller
- Succeeded by: Thomas Bavin

Leader of the Opposition in New South Wales
- In office 22 June 1932 – 5 September 1939
- Deputy: Jack Baddeley
- Preceded by: Bertram Stevens
- Succeeded by: William McKell
- In office 18 October 1927 – 4 November 1930
- Deputy: Jack Baddeley
- Preceded by: Thomas Bavin
- Succeeded by: Thomas Bavin
- In office 31 July 1923 – 17 June 1925
- Deputy: Peter Loughlin
- Preceded by: Bill Dunn (acting)
- Succeeded by: George Fuller

8th Leader of the Australian Labor Party in New South Wales
- In office 31 July 1923 – 6 September 1939
- Deputy: Peter Loughlin; Jack Baddeley
- Preceded by: James Dooley; Bill Dunn (acting)
- Succeeded by: William McKell
Cabinet posts
Secretary for Lands and Minister for Forests
In office 25 November 1926 – 26 May 1927
Preceded by	Peter Loughlin
Succeeded by	Ted Horsington
Minister for Agriculture
Acting
In office 23 March – 3 September 1926
Preceded by	Bill Dunn
Succeeded by	Bill Dunn
37th Colonial Treasurer of New South Wales
In office 15 October 1931 – 13 May 1932
Preceded by	Himself
Succeeded by	Bertram Stevens
In office 4 November 1930 – 15 October 1931
Preceded by	Bertram Stevens
Succeeded by	Himself
In office 17 June 1925 – 18 October 1927
Preceded by	George Fuller
Succeeded by	Thomas Bavin
In office 20 December 1921 – 13 April 1922
Premier	James Dooley
Preceded by	Arthur Cocks
Succeeded by	Arthur Cocks
In office 13 April 1920 – 10 October 1921
Premier	John Storey
Preceded by	John Fitzpatrick
Succeeded by	Arthur Cocks
Electorates
Member of the New South Wales Legislative Assembly for Auburn
In office 8 October 1927 – 15 August 1946
Preceded by	Electorate established
Succeeded by	Chris Lang
Member of the New South Wales Legislative Assembly for Parramatta
In office 20 March 1920 – 7 September 1927 Serving with Albert Bruntnell, Bill Ely and Thomas Morrow
Preceded by	Albert Bruntnell (Note: Between 1880 and 1920, the electoral district of Parramatta was a single-member electorate. In 1927 the electorate again went back to holding one MP.)
Succeeded by	Albert Bruntnell
Member of the New South Wales Legislative Assembly for Granville
In office 6 December 1913 – 18 February 1920
Preceded by	John Nobbs
Succeeded by	Electorate abolished
Federal politics
Member of the Australian Parliament for Reid
In office 28 September 1946 – 10 December 1949
Preceded by	Charles Morgan
Succeeded by	Charles Morgan

Personal details
- Born: John Thomas Lang; 21 December 1876 Brickfield Hill, Sydney City, Colony of New South Wales (Note: Full birth-place was: George Street, Brickfield Hill, Sydney City, Colony of New South Wales.)
- Died: 27 September 1975 (aged 98) Auburn, New South Wales, Australia
- Resting place: Catholic Lawn Cemetery, Rookwood
- Party: Labor (1909–1943; from 1971)
- Other political affiliations: Lang Labor (1931–1950); Labor (NC) (1940–1941; 1943–1950)
- Height: 193 cm (6 ft 4 in)
- Spouse: Hilda Amelia Bredt (m. 1896; died 1964)
- Children: 7, including Chris
- Parents: James Henry Lang (father); Mary Whelan (mother)
- Education: St Francis Marist Brothers' School, Brickfield Hill

John Thomas Lang (21 December 1876 – 27 September 1975), nicknamed "the Big Fella", was an Australian politician who served as the 23rd premier of New South Wales from 1925 to 1927 and from 1930 to 1932. He was the state leader of the Australian Labor Party (ALP) from 1923 to 1939 and his Lang Labor faction was an influential force in both state and federal politics, breaking away from the official ALP on several occasions.

Lang was born to a working-class family in Sydney and grew up in the city's inner suburbs. He left school at the age of 14 and worked a variety of jobs, eventually establishing a real estate agency in the Sydney suburb of Auburn. Lang was first elected to the New South Wales Legislative Assembly at the 1913 state election and would hold several seats over the following 30 years. He remained loyal to the ALP following the 1916 party split over conscription and served as state treasurer from 1920 to 1922 in the governments of John Storey and James Dooley.

In 1923, Lang replaced Dooley as state leader of the ALP, a position he would maintain for 15 years despite a confrontational and pugnacious leadership style and competing factional demands. He led the party to a narrow victory at the 1925 state election. His first term as premier saw the passage of social and industrial reforms, but was also marked by conflict with the conservative Legislative Council and by internal party conflict. He was forced to an early election in 1927, which saw the ALP defeated. However, Lang and the ALP were returned to office in a landslide victory at the 1930 election.

During the Great Depression, Lang was a key figure in the ALP split of 1931, which saw the defeat of the federal Labor government led by James Scullin. He advocated economic populism and produced the "Lang Plan", which called for the repudiation or deferral of overseas debts to avoid the austerity measures in the Premiers' Plan. Lang's supporters in federal parliament supported a no-confidence motion in Scullin's government, with the ALP suffering a landslide defeat at the 1931 federal election. Lang's continued conflict with the new federal government led by Joseph Lyons, including defiance of federal laws, precipitated the 1932 New South Wales constitutional crisis. The crisis culminated when the Governor, Sir Philip Game, used his reserve power to dismiss Lang and his government, the only such dismissal of an Australian state premier.

After his dismissal, Lang suffered a landslide defeat at the 1932 state election and led the ALP to further defeats at the 1935 and 1938 state elections. His faction rejoined the official ALP in 1936, but factional conflict continued and he was finally ousted as leader in 1939. Attributing his defeat to communists, in 1940 he formed the Australian Labor Party (Non-Communist), which achieved some electoral success but soon rejoined the official ALP in the interests of wartime unity. Lang was expelled from the ALP in 1943 and later served a single term in the House of Representatives from 1946 to 1949, representing the seat of Reid. He assumed the role of elder statesman in retirement and was re-admitted to the ALP in 1971 a few years before his death at the age of 98.

== Early life ==
John Thomas Lang was born on 21 December 1876 on George Street, Sydney, close to the present site of The Metro Theatre (between Bathurst and Liverpool Streets). He was the third son (and sixth of ten children) of James Henry Lang, a watchmaker born in Edinburgh, Scotland, and Mary Whelan, a milliner born in Galway, Ireland. His mother and father had arrived in Australia in 1848 and 1860, respectively, and married in Melbourne, Victoria, on 11 June 1866, moving to Sydney five years later. Although Lang's father had been born Presbyterian, he later became a Catholic like his wife, and the family "fitted into the normal low social stratum of the great majority of Sydney's Catholics".

The family lived in the inner-city slums for the majority of Lang's early childhood, including for a period on Wexford Street in Surry Hills, where he attended a local school, St Francis Marist Brothers' on Castlereagh Street. His father suffered from rheumatic fever for most of Lang's childhood, and he supplemented his family's income by selling newspapers in the city on mornings and afternoons. In the mid-1880s, due to his parents' poverty, he was sent to live with his mother's sister on a small rural property near Bairnsdale, in the Gippsland region of Victoria, attending for about four years the local Catholic school. Lang returned to New South Wales in the early 1890s to seek employment, aged 14. His first jobs were in the rural areas to the south-west of Sydney: on a poultry farm at Smithfield, and then as the driver of a horse-drawn omnibus in and around Merrylands and Guildford.

Aged 16, he returned to the inner city, working first in a bookstore, and then as an office boy for an accountant. Nairn (1986) writes that Lang's experience in the Sydney slums brought "an intimate knowledge […] of the protean denizens who found shelter there", inculcating in Lang some "real sympathy for them, but above all a determination to avoid their kind of existence, reinforced by a revulsion against the hardships of his own life in a large, generally poverty-stricken family."

== Early career ==
During the banking crash of the 1890s which devastated Australia, Lang became interested in politics, frequenting radical bookshops and helping with newspapers and publications of the infant Labor Party, which contested its first election in New South Wales in 1891. At the age of 19 he married Hilda Amelia Bredt (1878–1964), the 17-year-old daughter of prominent feminist and socialist Bertha Bredt, and the step-daughter of W. H. McNamara, who owned a bookshop in Castlereagh Street. Hilda's sister, also named Bertha, was married to the author and poet Henry Lawson.

Lang became a junior office assistant for an accounting practice, where his shrewdness and intelligence saw his career advance. Around 1900 he became the manager of a real estate firm in the then semi-rural suburb of Auburn. He was so successful that he soon set up his own real estate business in an area much in demand by working-class families looking to escape the squalor and overcrowding of the inner-city slums.

As a resident in the unincorporated area around Silverwater and Newington, Lang became Secretary of the Newington Progress Association and led local efforts for the area to join the Municipality of Auburn. On 20 June 1906, this was proclaimed, with the area included as the "Newington Ward", returning three aldermen. Lang was elected to first position in the new ward in April 1907, and served two terms as Mayor of Auburn in 1909–1911.

He was elected as a member of the New South Wales Legislative Assembly in 1913 for the district of Granville, serving as a backbencher in the Labor Party government led by William Holman. When Prime Minister Billy Hughes twice tried to introduce conscription to the country in WWI, Lang sided with the anti-conscriptionist wing of the ALP. The mass defection from the ALP of parliamentarians and supporters who supported the military measure opened up opportunities and Lang positioned himself for advancement. His financial skills led him to become Treasurer in Premier John Storey's Labor government from 1920 to 1922. Due to the post-World War I financial recession, the state's accounts were in deficit; Lang managed to cut this deficit significantly. From 1920 to 1927, he was a member for the multi-member seat of Parramatta.

After the Labor Party (ALP) lost government in 1922, Lang was elected as Opposition Leader in 1923 by his fellow Labor Party MPs. He led the ALP to victory in the 1925 NSW general election and became Premier.

== Lang premiership ==
=== First term, 1925–1927 ===
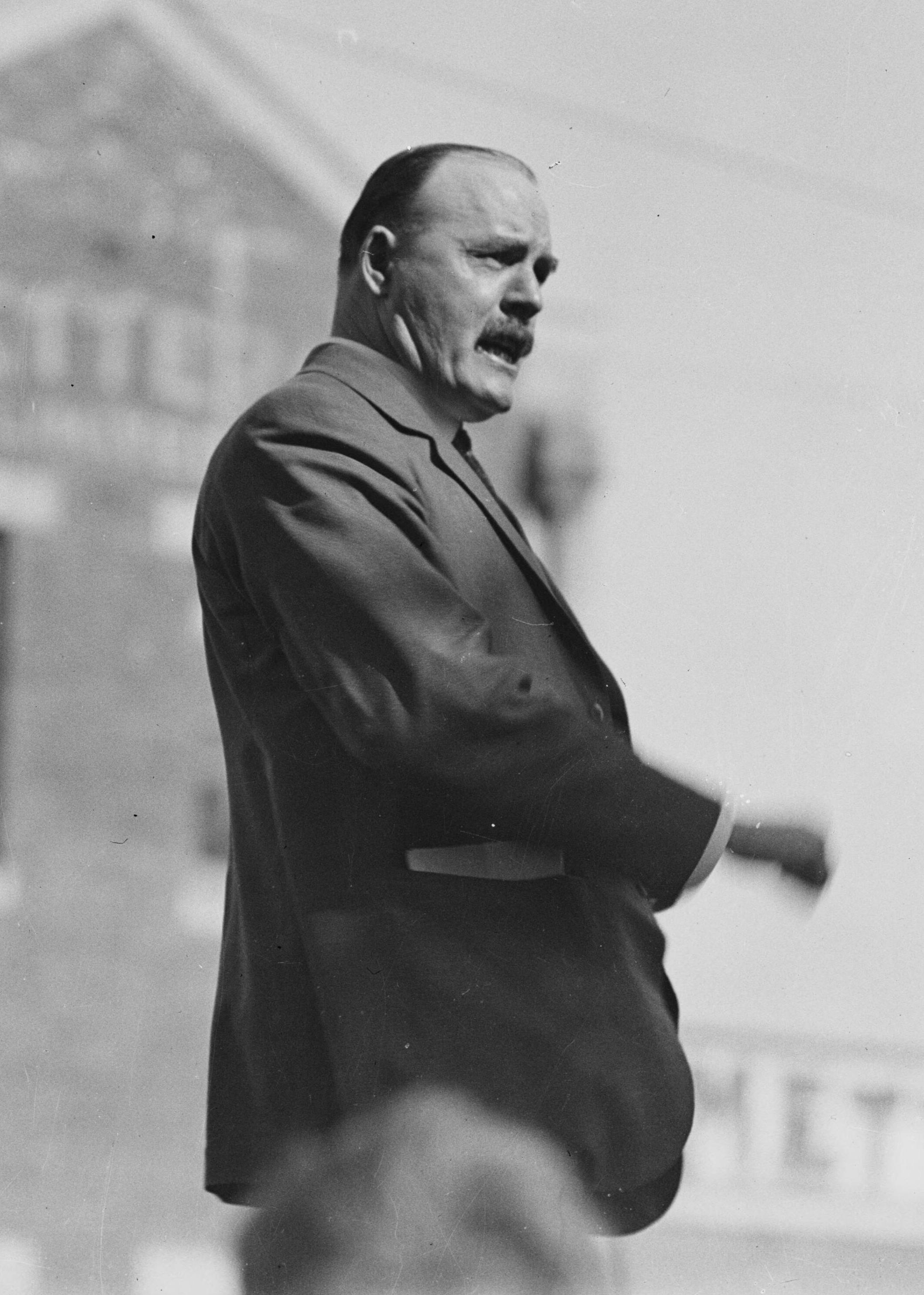
Lang giving a speech in 1930

During his first term as Premier, Lang carried out many social reforms, including state pensions for widowed mothers with dependent children under fourteen, a universal and mandatory system of workers' compensation for death, illness and injury incurred on the job, funded by premiums levied on employers, the abolition of student fees in state-run high schools and improvements to various welfare schemes such as child endowment (which Lang's government had introduced). Various laws were introduced providing for improvements in the accommodation of rural workers, changes in the industrial arbitration system, and a 44-hour workweek. Extensions were made to the applicability of the Fair Rents Act while compulsory marketing along the lines of what existed in Queensland was introduced. Adult franchise for local government elections was also introduced, together with Legislation to safeguard native flora and to penalize ships for discharging oil. His government also carried out road improvements, including paving much of the Hume Highway and the Great Western Highway.

Lang also restored the seniority and conditions to New South Wales Government Railways and New South Wales Government Tramways workers who had been sacked or demoted after the General Strike of 1917, including Ben Chifley, a future Prime Minister of Australia.

Lang established universal suffrage in local government elections – previously only those who owned real estate in a city, municipality or shire could vote in that area's local council elections. His government also passed legislation to allow women to sit in the upper house of the New South Wales Parliament in 1926. This was the first government to do so in the British Empire and three years before the 'Persons Case' decision of the Privy Council in London would grant the same privilege to women throughout the Empire.

By contrast, his attempts to abolish the life-appointed upper house of the NSW Parliament, the Legislative Council, were unsuccessful. His attempts, based around requesting from the governor, Sir Dudley de Chair, enough appointees to swamp the council that would then vote for its abolition (the same approach his Queensland Labor colleagues had taken to their upper house in 1922), brought him into significant conflict with the governor. However, his government's agenda required more political support to pass than the upper house was able to give, and Lang and the Labor party sought to eliminate what they saw as an outdated bastion of conservative privilege through this approach. At the occasion of the laying of the foundation stone for the new Auburn Town Hall in November 1926, he declared: "If I have my way, the Upper House will not be there much longer. Such a condition cannot continue, and, in fact, will not prevail much longer; but, for the time being, it is there, and our laws must continue to suffer while it exists."

After Labor's defeat at the 1927 election, Lang was Opposition Leader again from 1927 to October 1930. After New South Wales returned to single-member electorates, Lang was elected as the member for Auburn, a seat he held until he left state politics in 1946. In this period the Great Depression in Australia had begun in earnest with devastating effects on the nation's welfare and security.

=== Second term, 1930–1932 ===
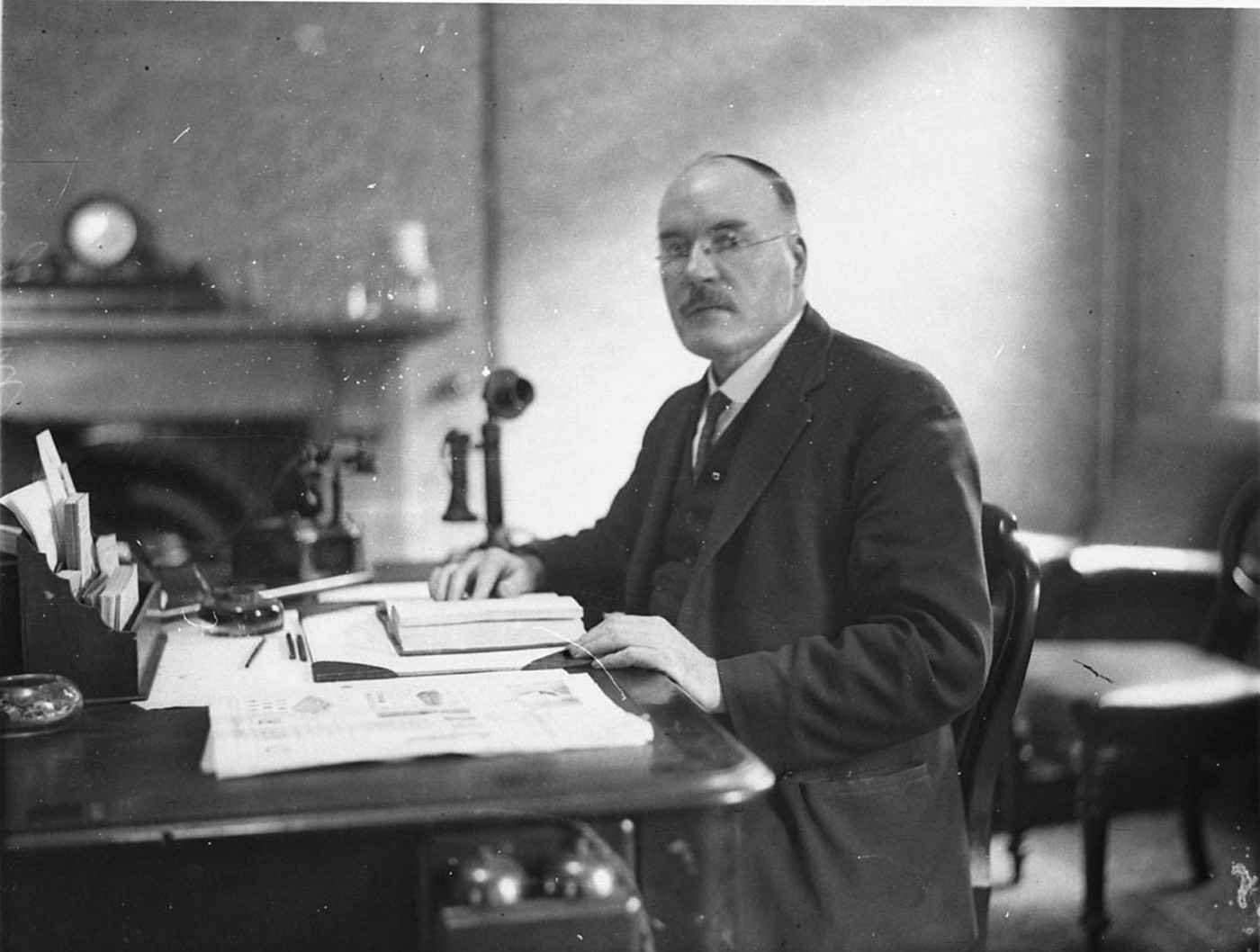
Study of NSW Premier, Jack Lang, in his office

In 1930, more than one in five adult males in New South Wales were without a job. Australian governments responded to the Depression with measures that, Lang claimed, made circumstances even worse - cuts to government spending, civil service salaries and public works cancellations. Lang vigorously opposed these measures and was elected in a landslide in October 1930.

As Premier, Lang refused to cut government salaries and spending, a stand which was popular with his constituents, but which made the state's fiscal position more parlous, though the economic state of the six other various Australian governments fared little better during this same period. In the wake of the Great Depression, measures were taken to ease the hardships of evicted tenants together with the hardships facing householders and other debtors battling to meet repayments. He passed laws restricting the rights of landlords to evict defaulting tenants, and insisted on paying the legal minimum wage to all workers on relief projects.

At an economic crisis conference in Canberra in 1931, Jack Lang announced his own programme for economic recovery. The "Lang Plan" advocated the temporary cessation of interest repayments on debts to Britain and that interest on all government borrowings be reduced to 3% to free up money for injection into the economy, the abolition of the Gold standard to be replaced by a "Goods Standard" where the amount of money in circulation was linked to the number of goods produced, and the immediate injection of £18 million of new money into the economy in the form of Commonwealth Bank of Australia credit. The Prime Minister and all other state Premiers rejected the plan.

Lang was a powerful orator, and during the crisis of the Depression, he addressed huge crowds in Sydney and other centres, promoting his populist program and denouncing his opponents and the wealthy in extravagant terms. His followers promoted the slogans "Lang is Right" and "Lang is Greater than Lenin." Lang was not a revolutionary or even a socialist, and he loathed the Communist Party, which in turn denounced him as a social fascist.

On 19 March 1932, Lang opened the Sydney Harbour Bridge. Lang caused some controversy when he insisted on officially opening the bridge himself, rather than allowing the Governor, the King's representative in NSW, to do so. He delivered what has come to be regarded as a landmark speech in Australian political history during the Opening, citing the theme that the completion of the Sydney Harbour Bridge was analogous to the history, development and dreams of the Australian nation and its people. It may be inferred that this speech depicted Lang's personal vision of the past, present and future of New South Wales and Australia's place in the British Empire and world, (to read this speech, refer to 'Stirring Australian Speeches', edited by Michael Cathcart and Kate Darian-Smith). Just as Lang was about to cut the ribbon to open the Sydney Harbour Bridge, Captain Francis de Groot, a member of the paramilitary New Guard movement, rode up and broke the ribbon. The New Guard also planned to kidnap Lang, and plotted a coup against him during the crisis that brought Lang's premiership to an end.

=== The Crisis of 1931–1932 ===
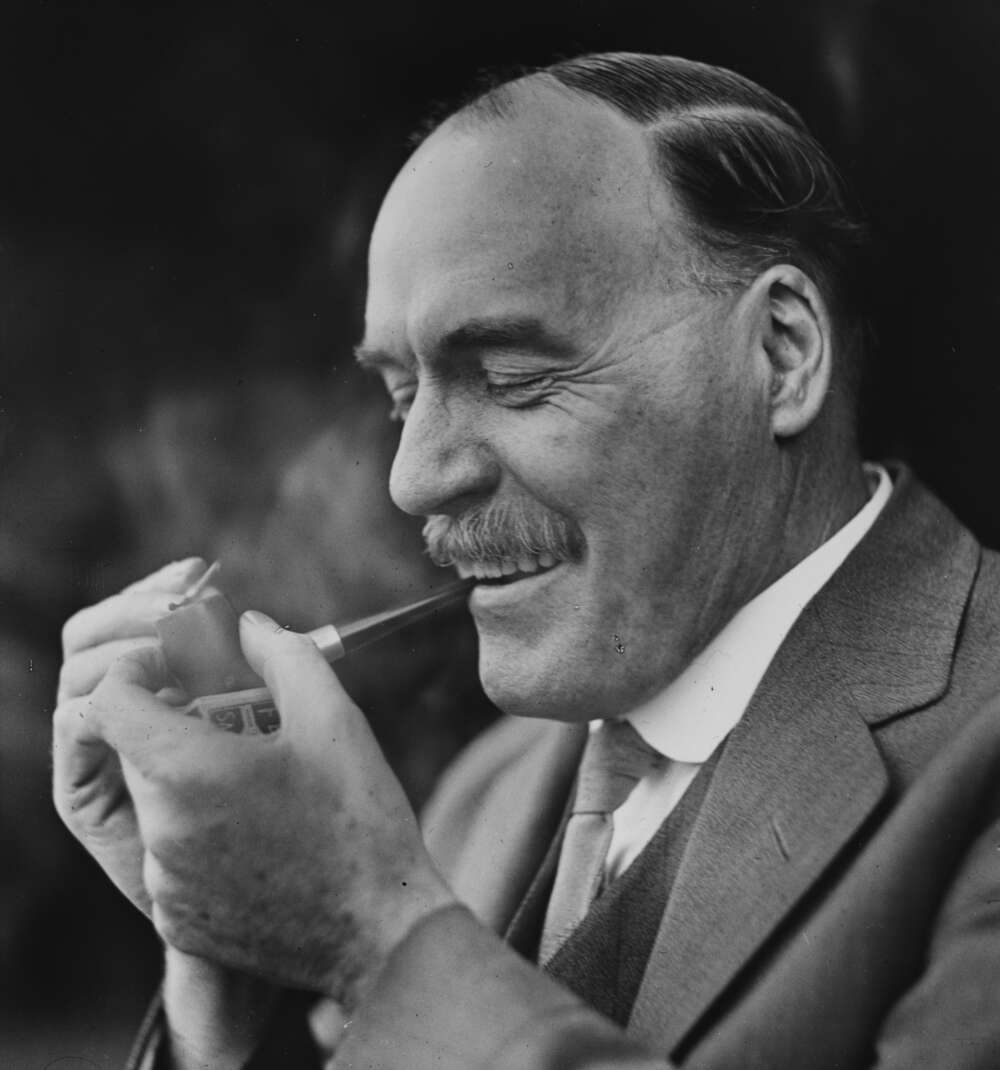
Lang smoking his trademark pipe

Early in 1931, Jack Lang released his own plan to combat the Depression; this became known as "the Lang Plan". This was in contrast to the "Melbourne Agreement", later known as the Premiers' Plan, which all other State Governments and the Federal Government had agreed to in 1930. Key points of the Lang Plan included the temporary cessation of interest repayments on debts to Britain and that interest on all government borrowings be reduced to 3% to free up money for injection into the economy, the cancellation of interest payments to overseas bondholders and financiers on government borrowings, the injection of more funds into the nation's money supply as central bank credit for the revitalisation of industry and commerce, and the abolition of the gold standard, to be replaced by a "Goods Standard," whereby the amount of currency in circulation would be fixed to the number of goods produced within the Australian economy. The banks had indicated that if he paid the interest they would advance him an additional amount which was greater than the interest, thus giving him a positive cash flow.

Lang opposed the Premiers' Plan agreed to by the federal Labor government of James Scullin and the other state Premiers, who called for even more stringent cuts to government spending to balance the budget. In October 1931 Lang's followers in the federal House of Representatives crossed the floor to vote with the conservative United Australia Party and bring down the Scullin government. This action split the NSW Labor Party in two – Lang's followers became known as Lang Labor, while Scullin's supporters, led by Chifley, became known in NSW as Federal Labor. Most of the party's branches and affiliated trade unions supported Lang.

Since the Commonwealth Government had become responsible for state debts in 1928 under an amendment to the Constitution, the new UAP government of Joseph Lyons paid the interest to the overseas bondholders and then set about extracting the money from NSW by passing the Financial Agreement Enforcement Act 1932, which the High Court held to be valid. Lang then contended that the Act was rendered null and void by contravening the 1833 prohibition of slavery throughout the British Empire; the Premier held that the actions of the Lyons government deprived the State of New South Wales means of paying the wages of State employees and that this necessarily constituted an (illegal) state of slavery.

In response, Lang withdrew all the state's funds from government bank accounts and held them at the Trades Hall in cash, so the federal government could not gain access to the money. The Governor, Sir Philip Game, a retired Royal Air Force officer, advised Lang that in his view this action was illegal and that if Lang did not reverse it he would dismiss the government. Lang stood firm, and on 13 May 1932, the Governor withdrew Lang's commission and appointed the UAP leader, Bertram Stevens, as premier. Stevens immediately called an election, at which Labor was heavily defeated.

Gerald Stone, in his book 1932, states that there is evidence that Lang considered arresting the Governor to prevent the Governor from dismissing him, (which Lang admitted in his own book, The Turbulent Years). The possibility was sufficiently high that the armed forces of the Commonwealth were put on alert. Andrew Moore and Michael Cathcart, among others, have put forward the possibility that such a clash would have seen the Commonwealth Armed Forces fighting the New South Wales Police.

This was the first case of an Australian government with the confidence of the lower house of Parliament being dismissed by a Vice-Regal representative, the second case being when Governor-General Sir John Kerr dismissed Gough Whitlam's government on 11 November 1975 (which Lang would not live to see by just 45 days). Game himself felt his decision was the right one, despite the fact that he had no personal animosity towards Lang. On 2 July 1932 Game wrote to his mother-in-law: "Still with all his faults of omission and commission I had and still have a personal liking for Lang and a great deal of sympathy for his ideals and I did not at all relish being forced to dismiss him. But I felt faced with the alternative of doing so or reducing the job of Governor all over the Empire to a farce." Lang himself, despite objecting to his dismissal conceded afterwards that he too liked Game, regarding him as fair and polite, and having had good relations with him.

== Later career ==
Lang continued to lead the Labor Opposition, although the NSW Branch of the ALP remained separate from the rest of the party. The UAP won the elections of 1935 and 1938. After this third defeat, the Federal Labor forces began to gain ground in NSW, as many union officials became convinced that Labor would never win again in the state while Lang remained leader. Lang was ousted as NSW Opposition Leader in 1939 and was replaced by William McKell, who became Premier in 1941.

Grave of Jack and Hilda Lang at Rookwood Cemetery.

Lang was expelled from NSW Labor by the state executive on 5 March 1943, and started his own parallel Labor Party, called the ALP (Non-Communist), but this time with only minority support in the NSW party and unions. Through the 1940s, he railed against the dangers of communism as a 'Cold War warrior'. He remained a member of the Legislative Assembly until 1946, resigning to stand for the Division of Reid in the Australian House of Representatives. His state seat of Auburn was won by his son Chris at a by-election. Jack Lang's victory in Reid was unexpected; he was elected on a minority of the votes thanks to preferences given to him by the Liberal Party. In federal parliament, he is often cited as being the most effective of the opposition to the government of his old rival, Prime Minister Ben Chifley, despite voting for the latter's Bank Act in 1947. He contested the seat of Blaxland in the 1949 federal election, but was defeated and never held office again, despite a bid to be elected to the Senate in 1951.

Lang spent his long retirement editing his newspaper The Century, and wrote several books about his political life, including The Great Bust, I Remember and The Turbulent Years. He grew increasingly conservative as he grew older, supporting the White Australia Policy after the rest of the labour movement had abandoned it. In I Remember he wrote: "White Australia must not be regarded as a mere political shibboleth. It was Australia's Magna Carta. Without that policy, this country would have been lost long ere this. It would have been engulfed in an Asian tidal wave." To the end of his life, he proudly proclaimed that "Lang was Right." Lang also spent time visiting Sydney schools recounting recollections of his time in office to his young audience. Lang gave a number of lectures at Sydney University circa 1972–1973, at which he discussed his time in office and other topics such as economic reform. His address given on 1 July 1969 to the students of Sefton High School is available on tape at the Mitchell Library. He was re-admitted to the Labor Party in 1971, initiated by Blaxland MP Paul Keating and supported by Macquarie MP Tony Luchetti. In the 1993 ABC TV documentary Labor in Power, Keating noted on Lang: "Lang finished his political life with not an ounce of bitterness in him. I never heard him ever refer to anyone disparagingly, and he always had a kind word for Curtin, always."

Lang died in Auburn in September 1975, aged 98, and was commemorated with a packed house and overflowing crowds outside Sydney's St. Mary's Cathedral at his Requiem Mass and memorial service. His funeral was attended by prominent Labor leaders including then Prime Minister Gough Whitlam. He was buried at Rookwood Cemetery, Sydney.

=== Works ===
- Lang, John Thomas (1944). Communism in Australia.
- Lang, John Thomas (1946). For Australia: Stirring Speech. New Zealand Worker Print.
- Lang, John Thomas (1956). I Remember. Invincible Press.
- Lang, John Thomas (1962). The Great Bust: The Depression of the Thirties. Angus & Robertson.
- Lang, John Thomas (1970). The Turbulent Years. Alpha Books.

== Notes ==
Notes

Citations

Civic offices
Preceded by Dr. Francis Henry Furnival	Mayor of Auburn; 1909–1911	Succeeded by John Hunter
New South Wales Legislative Assembly
Preceded by John Nobbs	Member for Granville; 1913–1920	District abolished
Preceded by Albert Bruntnell	Member for Parramatta; 1920–1927; Served alongside: Bruntnell, Ely/Morrow/Ely	Succeeded by Albert Bruntnell
New district	Member for Auburn; 1927–1946	Succeeded by Chris Lang
Political offices
Preceded by John Fitzpatrick	Colonial Treasurer; 1920–1921	Succeeded by Sir Arthur Cocks
Preceded by Sir Arthur Cocks	Colonial Treasurer; 1921–1922	Succeeded by Sir Arthur Cocks
Preceded by Bill Dunn	Leader of the Opposition of New South Wales; 1923–1925	Succeeded by George Fuller
Preceded by Sir George Fuller	Premier of New South Wales; 1925–1927	Succeeded by Thomas Bavin
Preceded by Sir George Fuller	Colonial Treasurer; 1925–1927	Succeeded by Thomas Bavin
Preceded by Peter Loughlin	Secretary for Lands; 1926–1927	Succeeded by Ted Horsington
Preceded by Peter Loughlin	Minister for Forests; 1926–1927	Succeeded by Ted Horsington
Preceded by Thomas Bavin	Leader of the Opposition of New South Wales; 1927–1930	Succeeded by Thomas Bavin
Preceded by Thomas Bavin	Premier of New South Wales; 1930–1932	Succeeded by Bertram Stevens
Preceded by Bertram Stevens	Colonial Treasurer; 1930–1932	Succeeded by Bertram Stevens
Preceded by Bertram Stevens	Leader of the Opposition of New South Wales; 1932–1939	Succeeded by William McKell
Party political offices
Preceded by Bill Dunn	Leader of the Australian Labor Party (NSW Branch); 1923–1939	Succeeded by William McKell
Parliament of Australia
Preceded by Charles Morgan	Member for Reid; 1946–1949	Succeeded by Charles Morgan
