= Francis de Groot =

Irish-Australian soldier and furniture maker (1888–1969)

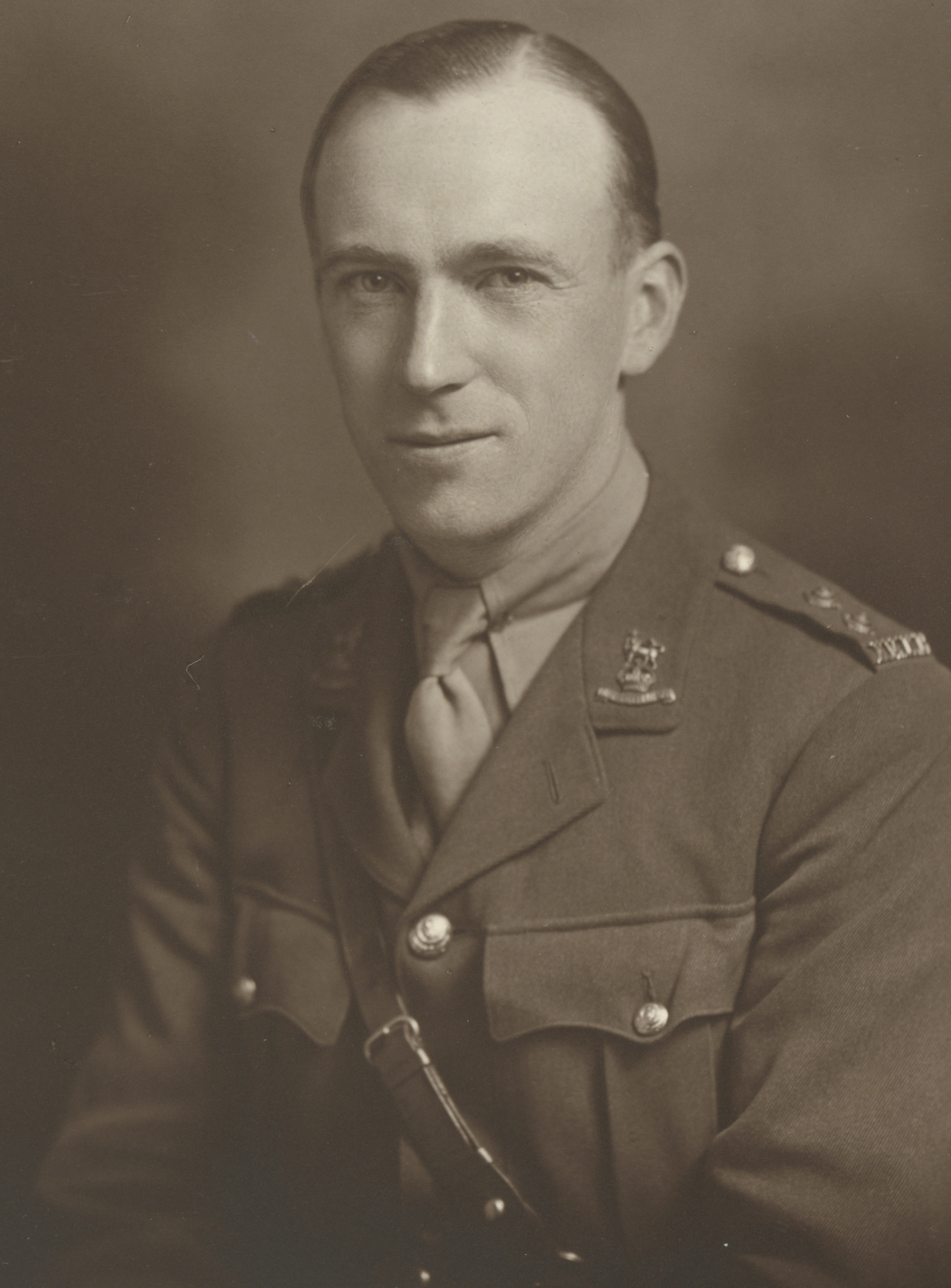
- de Groot in 1915
- Born: Francis Edward de Groot; 24 October 1888; Dublin, Ireland
- Died: 1 April 1969 (aged 80); Dublin, Ireland
- Education: Belvedere College; Blackrock College
- Occupations: Soldier, furniture maker
- Spouse: Mary Elizabeth Byrne (m. 1919)
- Military career
- Allegiance: United Kingdom; Australia
- Branch: British Army; Australian Army
- Service years: UK: 1907–1919; Australia: 1942–1944
- Rank: Captain
- Units: South Irish Horse; 5th Dragoon Guards; 15th The King's Hussars
- Conflicts: World War I; Western Front; World War II; Australian home front

Francis Edward de Groot (24 October 1888 – 1 April 1969) was an Irish-Australian soldier and furniture maker. He is best known for dramatically interrupting the official opening of the Sydney Harbour Bridge in 1932, attempting to slash the ribbon with a military sword while on horseback.

De Groot was born in Dublin, Ireland into a family of artisans. He left school at a young age and joined the Merchant Navy, later serving an apprenticeship with his uncle, an antiques dealer. He first lived in Australia from 1910 to 1914, working for Angus & Robertson as an antiques buyer. De Groot returned to Ireland in 1914 and enlisted in the British Army, having previously served with reserve units. He saw active service on the Western Front and finished the war with the rank of captain. In 1920, de Groot returned to Australia and established his own furniture-making business in Sydney, producing replicas of 18th-century furniture styles in Australian timber. He serviced a number of commercial clients and high-profile individuals from a workshop in Rushcutters Bay.

De Groot was a fascist and joined the paramilitary New Guard in 1931, taking part in clashes with left-wing groups. His disruption of the opening of the Sydney Harbour Bridge was designed to embarrass state premier Jack Lang, a particular target of the New Guard. He was arrested on the spot and charged with minor offences, receiving a small fine; he later successfully sued the police for wrongful arrest. Photographs and films of De Groot's actions were widely published and made him a significant public figure, although he played little further role in the New Guard. He continued his work as a furniture manufacturer and during World War II served with the Australian military, eventually retiring back to Ireland.

== Early life ==
De Groot was born on 24 October 1888 in central Dublin. He was the son of Mary (née Butler) and Cornelius De Groot. His father's family was of Dutch Huguenot ancestry. He came from "a dynasty of carvers and gilders"; his father was a wood carver and sculptor, while his paternal grandfather exhibited wood carvings at the Great Exhibition of 1851 and Irish Industrial Exhibition of 1852.

De Groot attended Blackrock College and Belvedere College in Dublin. He joined the Merchant Navy at the age of thirteen, but later took up an apprenticeship with his uncle Michael Butler, an antiques dealer, for whom he worked for five years in Dublin and London. He remained involved with the military, joining the South of Ireland Imperial Yeomanry in 1907 and serving for six months with the 5th Dragoon Guards in 1909.

=== Early years in Australia ===
In 1910, de Groot immigrated to Australia and settled in Sydney. He soon came into contact with bookseller and antiquarian George Robertson, one of the founders of the Angus & Robertson bookstore chain, and his associate Frederick Wymark. Robertson had tasked Wymark with opening a gallery attached to Angus & Robertson's Castlereagh Street store selling art and antiquities. De Groot's connections in Dublin and London proved useful to Wymark and he serviced a number of significant clients including Eadith Walker, Samuel Henry Ervin, Thomas Anderson Stuart, William Dixson, the Vickery family and the Hordern family. In his memoirs he recalled that Robertson had given him a budget of £10,000 (equivalent to $1,600,000 in 2022) to acquire items for resale by Angus & Robertson.

=== World War I ===
De Groot returned to Ireland on the outbreak of World War I and enlisted in the 15th Hussars, a cavalry regiment. He saw active service on the Western Front, later transferring to a tank battalion with the rank of acting captain. He was present for the Battle of the Somme in 1916 and the Battle of Passchendaele in 1917. He was discharged in 1919, with his discharge delayed by his recovery from Spanish flu.

== Furniture business ==
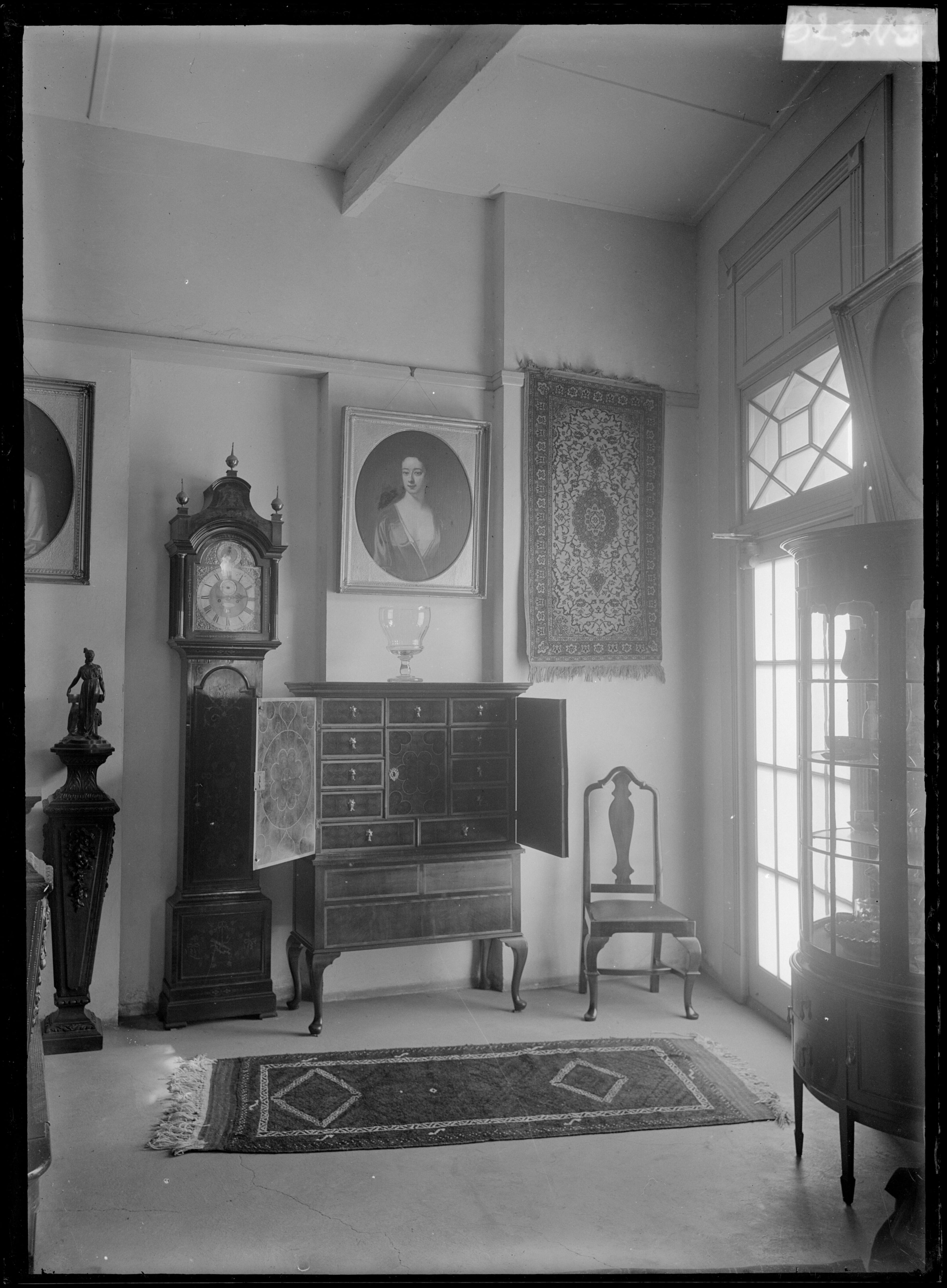
Photograph of de Groot's showroom in Rushcutters Bay, 1927

In October 1919, de Groot married Mary Elizabeth Byrne in Donnybrook, Dublin. They had first met in 1910 prior to de Groot's initial departure to Australia. After their marriage they took advantage of a War Office scheme which provided free passage to the Dominions for returned soldiers. They arrived in Sydney in May 1920 and de Groot established his own business as an antique dealer and manufacturer of reproduction furniture. De Groot's Auction Rooms opened in Phillip Street in 1921 and later shifted to Bent Street. Specialising in Queensland maple, his business proved immensely successful and by 1927 he was reportedly employing 200 artisans at his workshop in Rushcutters Bay. However, it has been suggested that the figures he claimed "seem implausible given the size of the Australian furniture market in the 1920s".

De Groot had a particular interest in 18th-century furniture styles, translating Chippendale, Adam and William and Mary styles into Australian timbers "with concessions to 20th century housekeeping". One of his most significant commissions in the 1920s was a refit of the David Jones department store chain. In 1934 he received a major commission from The Australia Hotel in Sydney, and the following year he designed a furniture suite for Governor-General Isaac Isaacs to be installed at Government House, Canberra. De Groot exhibited with The Society of Arts and Crafts of NSW in 1937 and advertised widely in interior design publications such as The Australian Home Builder and The Home. Outside of furniture he also collected china, silver, Waterford Crystal, and Persian rugs.

== Politics ==
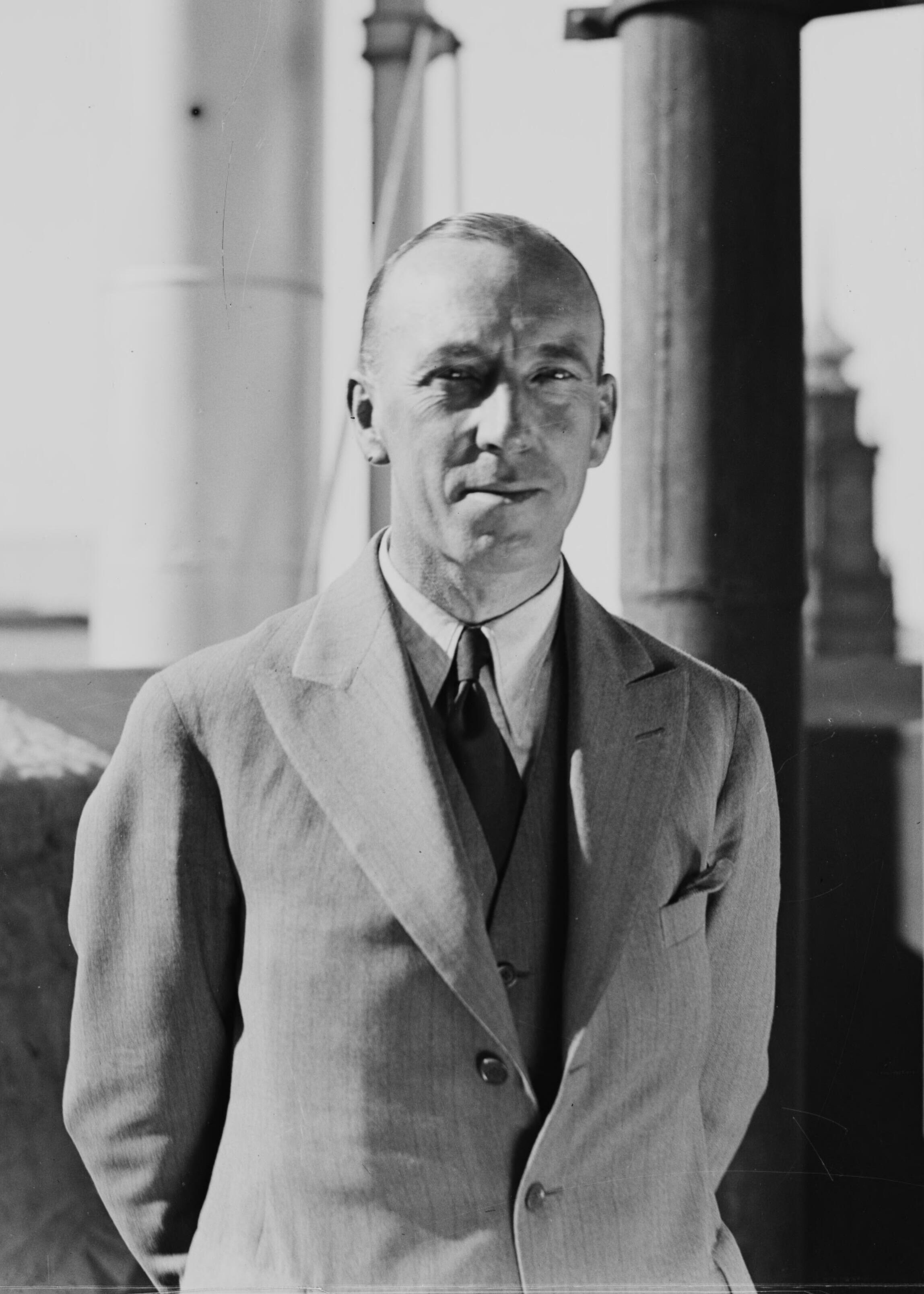
De Groot in 1932

During the 1930s, de Groot joined a fascist paramilitary organisation called the New Guard, which was politically opposed to the more left-wing government and the socialist views of NSW Premier Jack Lang. Many of the members of the New Guard were men who had served in World War I.

Seeking to attack leftist meetings, de Groot organised 1,000-strong groups of New Guard members throughout December 1931, commenting later that "the best reply to force, was greater force...seeing that we could command the greater force, [I] saw no reason why it should not be employed".

== Sydney Harbour Bridge opening ceremony incident ==
He became famous when, on 19 March 1932, he upstaged Lang at the opening of the Sydney Harbour Bridge, before a crowd of 300,000 people. He was not a member of the official party but, on horseback and dressed in his military uniform, he was able to blend in with the escort party of NSW Lancers. Lang was about to cut the ribbon to formally open the bridge, when de Groot rode forward and drew his ceremonial sword, attempting to cut the ribbon and declare the bridge open "in the name of the decent and respectable people of New South Wales". While many accounts say de Groot succeeded in slashing the ribbon, at least one eyewitness has disputed the claim and suggested it was probably broken by the hooves of his rearing horse. He said this was in protest that the Governor of New South Wales, Sir Philip Game, had not been invited to perform the ceremony. The Mayor of North Sydney, Hubert Primrose, an official participant at the opening ceremony, was also a member of the New Guard, but whether he was involved in planning de Groot's act is unknown. De Groot was also said to have later joined the White Army, another fascist organisation founded in Victoria in 1931.

=== Arrest ===
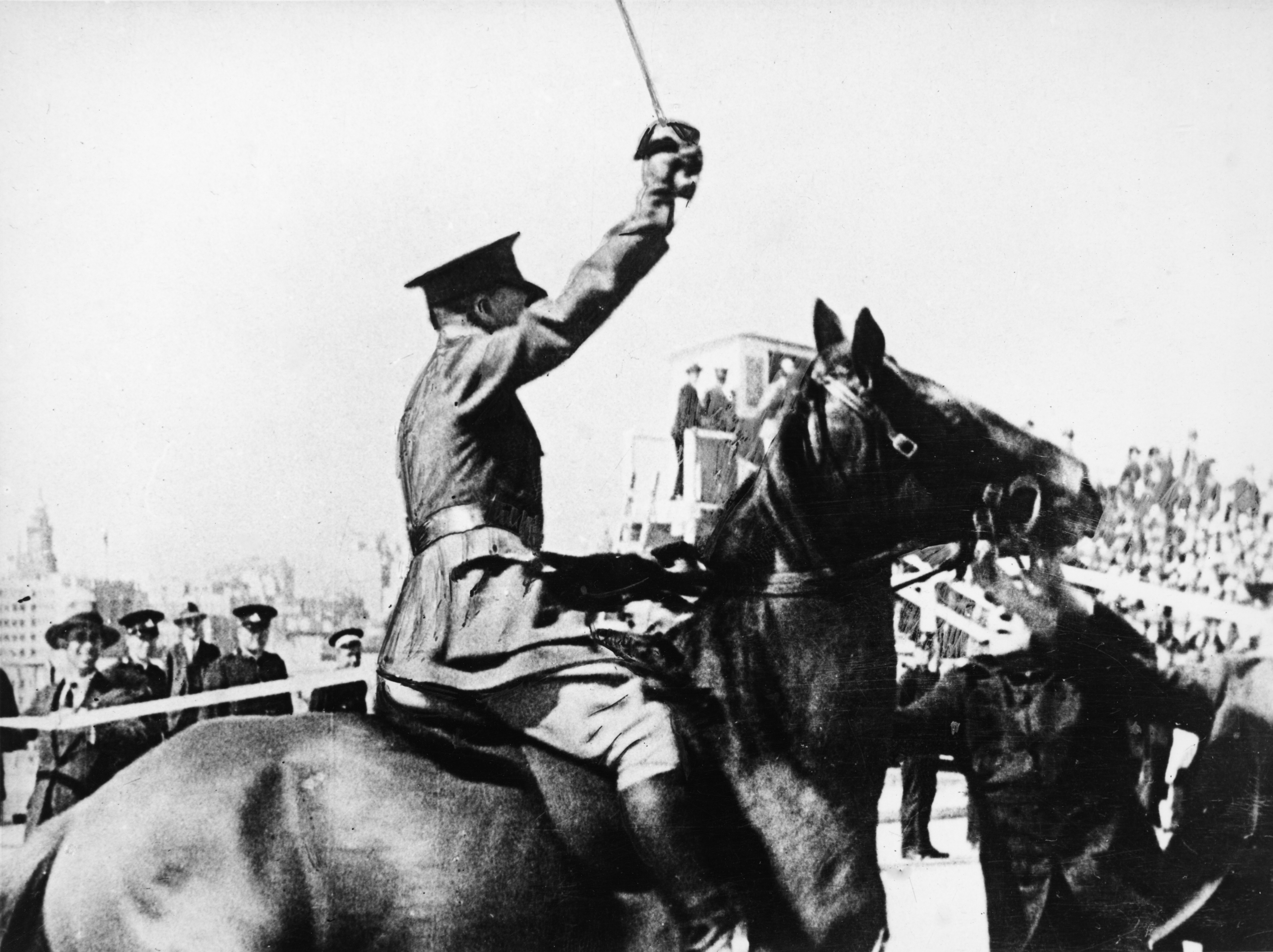
de Groot trying to cut the ribbon

W. J. Mackay, Chief of the CBI pulled de Groot from his horse, arrested him, and confiscated his ceremonial sword. Initially he was taken to a small police station attached to the toll house on the Sydney Harbour Bridge. Later in the day he was sent to the Lunatic Reception House at Darlinghurst, where he was formally charged with being insane and not under proper care and control. On the same afternoon de Groot was examined by Eric Hilliard, psychiatrist and medical superintendent of Parramatta Mental Hospital, who determined that de Groot was not insane. The following day de Groot was examined by W.S. Dawson, Professor of Psychiatry at the University of Sydney, and by John McPherson. Both doctors found him to be completely sane.

On 21 March 1932, de Groot appeared before Mr. McDougall, Stipendiary Magistrate, for the hearing of the charge of insanity. Detective Superintendent Mackay gave evidence to the effect that de Groot's actions on the Bridge were those of an insane man. Subsequently, Eric Hilliard gave his opinion, based on his examination of de Groot, that de Groot was sane. The magistrate subsequently ordered de Groot's discharge from the Reception House.

=== Charges ===
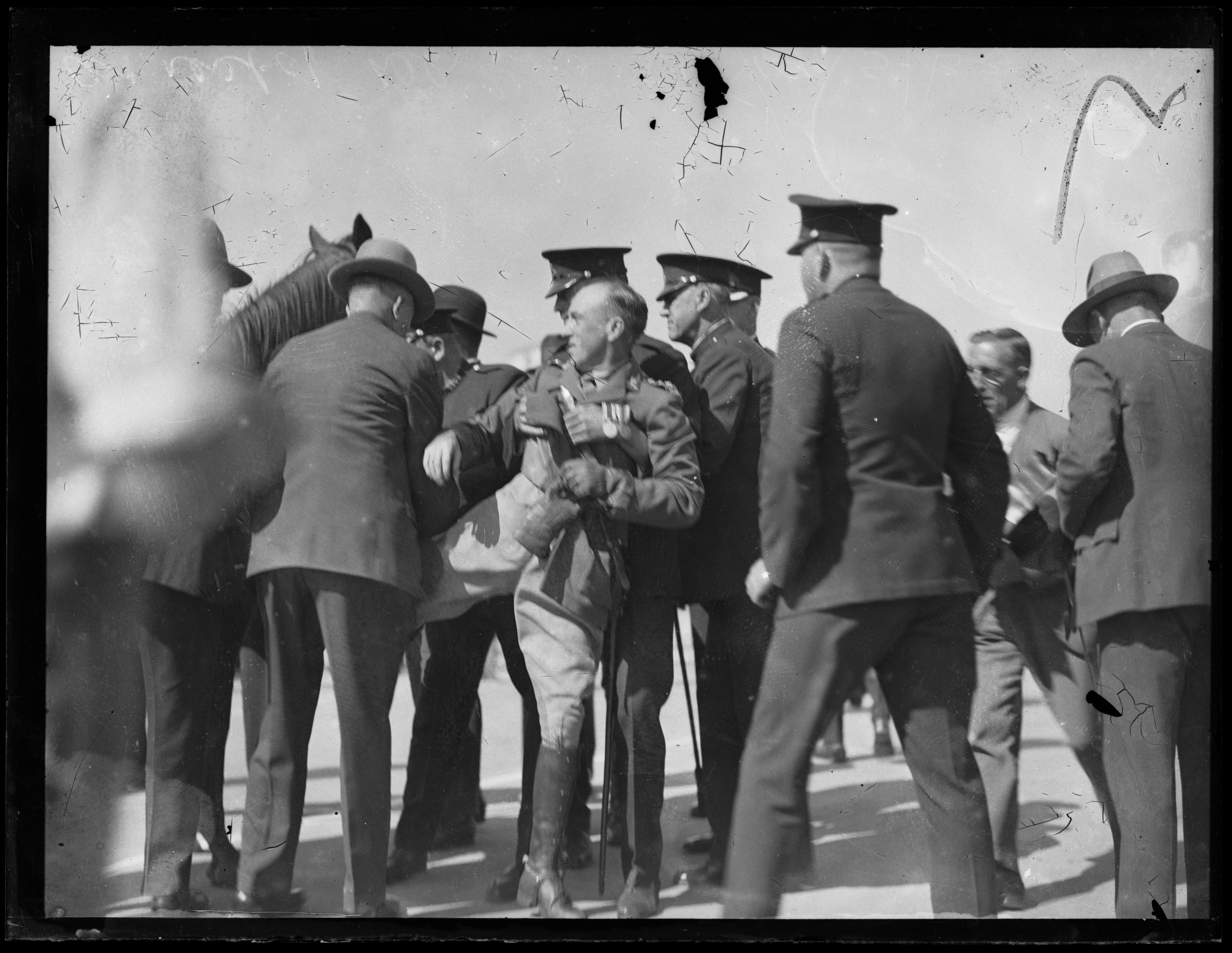
Photograph of de Groot's arrest

De Groot was subsequently charged with three offences. The three charges brought against him were:

1. Having maliciously damaged a ribbon which was the property of the Government of New South Wales to the value of £2;
2. Having behaved in an offensive manner in a public place; and
3. Having used threatening words to Inspector Stuart Robson in a public place.

The charges were heard on 1, 4, 5, and 6 April 1932 in the Central Police Court in Liverpool Street, Sydney before John Laidlaw, Chief Stipendiary Magistrate of New South Wales.

While the first and third charges laid against him were dismissed, the Magistrate did find de Groot guilty of offensive behaviour in Bradfield Highway – a public place. He was fined the maximum penalty of £5, with £4 in costs. The Magistrate found that "... the actions of the defendant were grossly offensive, provocative, and clearly unlawful".

Later, de Groot sued the Commissioner of police for wrongful arrest, and case was eventually settled out of court with de Groot receiving damages amounting to £69/1/9 (£69.09 or $138.18).

=== Horse ===
The horse ridden by de Groot at the opening ceremony was a 16.2-hand chestnut named "Mick". The horse belonged to a Pymble schoolgirl, Margo Reichard, and was borrowed by the leader of the New Guard, Eric Campbell, from her father Albert Reichard. After the escapade, the horse was initially taken to the Mounted Police Barracks before being returned to its owner. In about 1933 the horse had a fall while being ridden by Albert Reichard, and was put down.

== Later life ==
After the court case he sued for wrongful arrest on the grounds that a police officer had no right to arrest an officer of the Hussars. An out-of-court settlement was reached, and de Groot's ceremonial sword was returned to him. He later returned to Ireland, where he died on 1 April 1969.

Before his death, de Groot indicated he would like to see the sword returned to Australia. In 2004, the sword was found on a farm in County Wicklow, in the possession of de Groot's nephew. Plans were announced to have it valued and returned to Australia, possibly as a display at the National Museum of Australia. However, the museum was outbid by Paul Cave, the founder and chairman of BridgeClimb Sydney, the tourism company that conducted climbs across the Harbour Bridge. The sword was presented to Bridge Climb Sydney by prior students of Blackrock College, de Groot's old school, during a school reunion for ex-students now living in Australia.

== Gallery ==
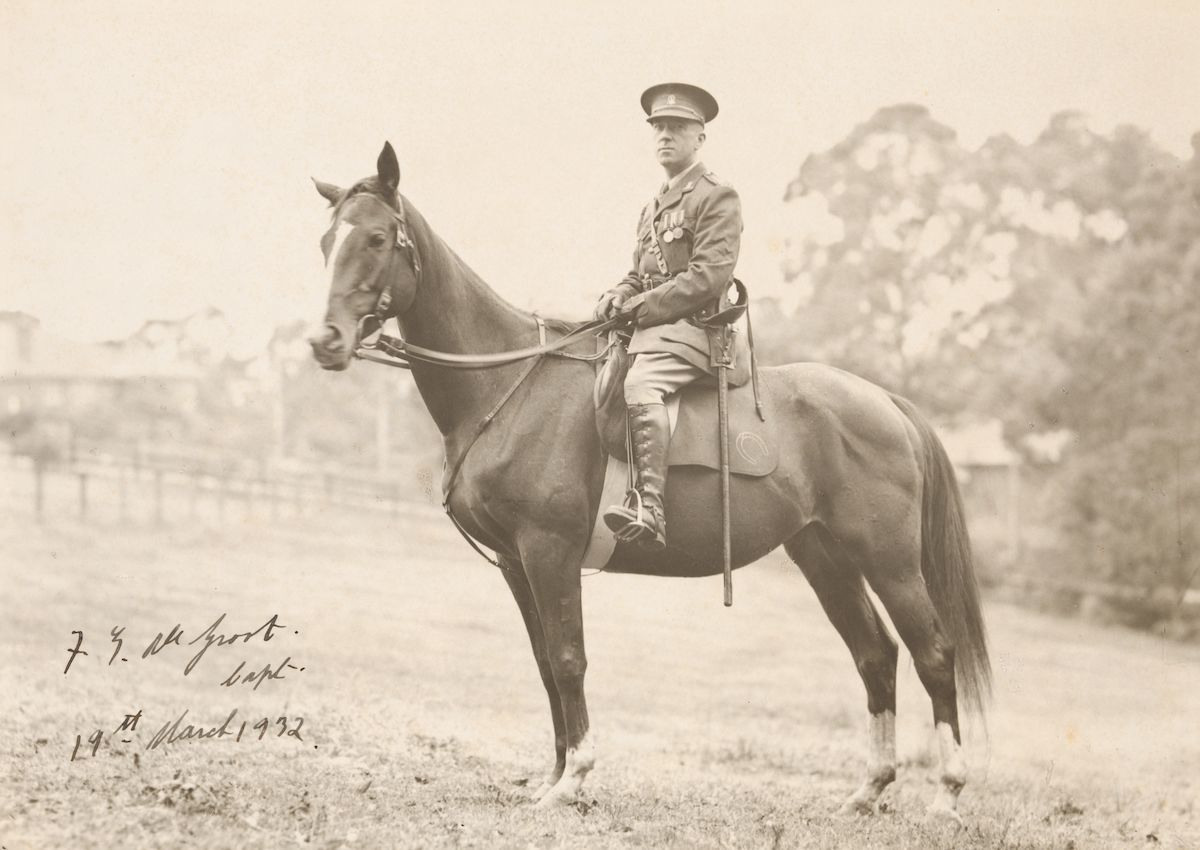
de Groot on horseback in 1932

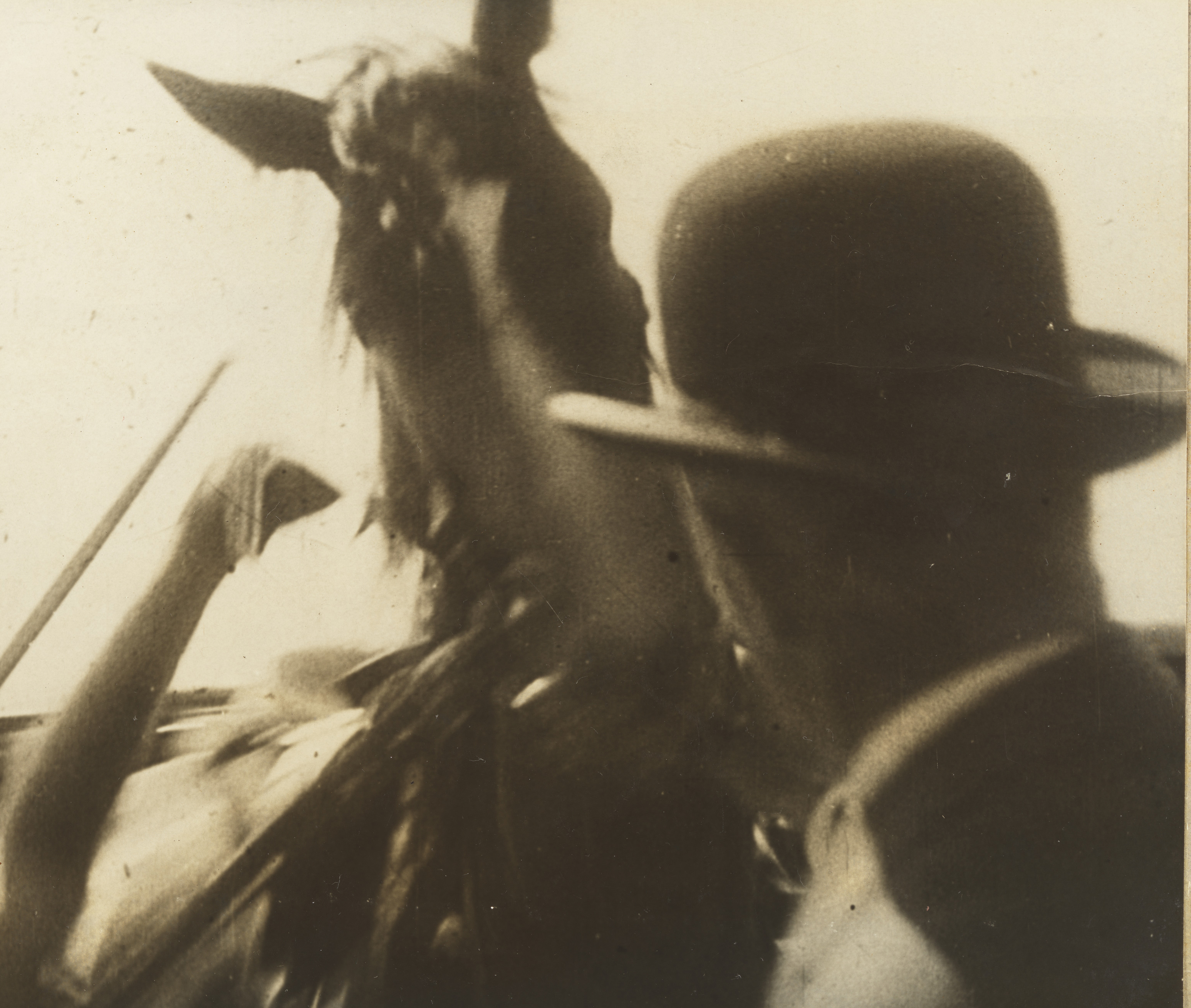
de Groot being dragged off his horse after cutting the opening ribbon

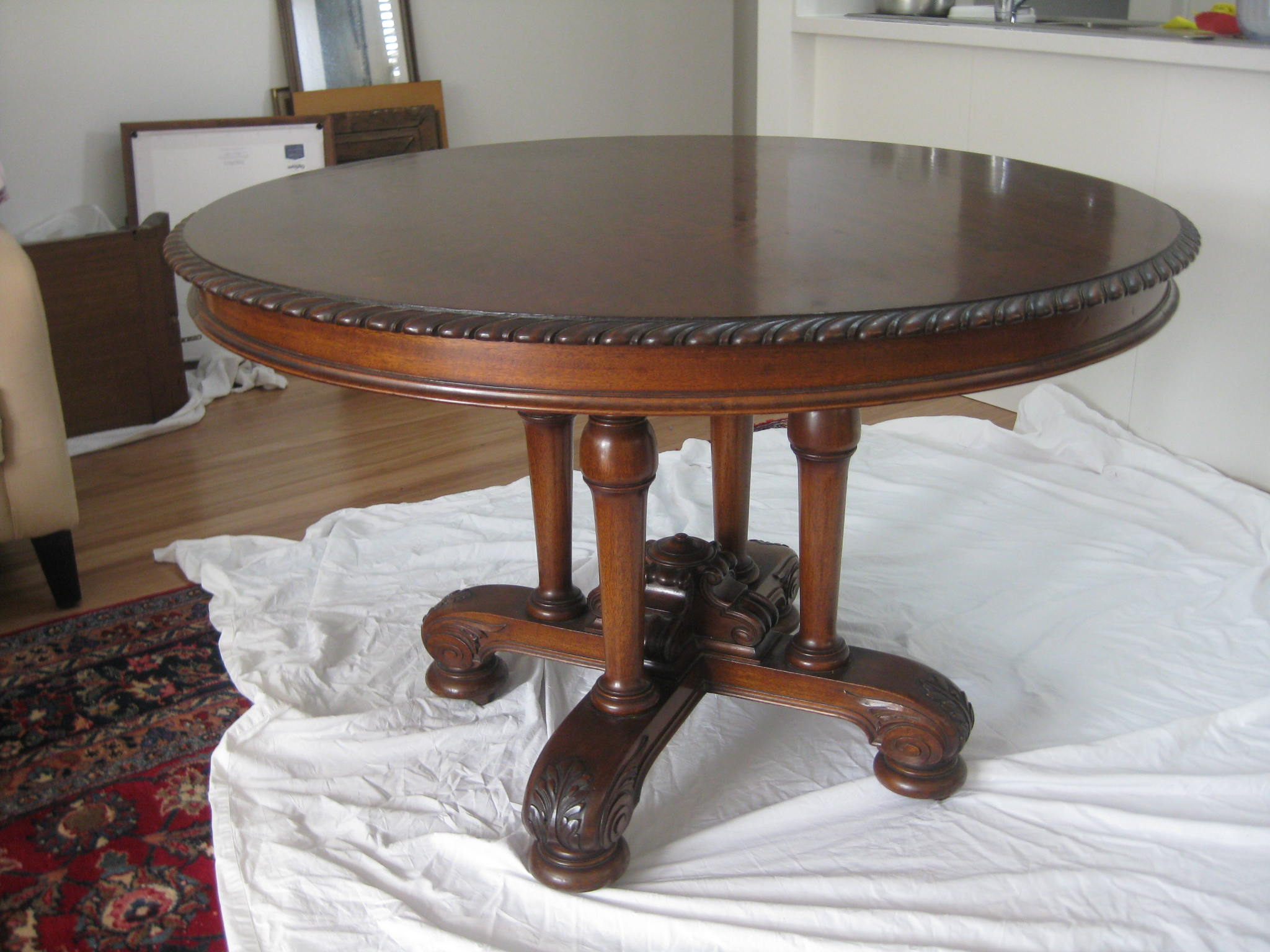
Dining table made by de Groot for Dame Eadith Walker of Yaralla

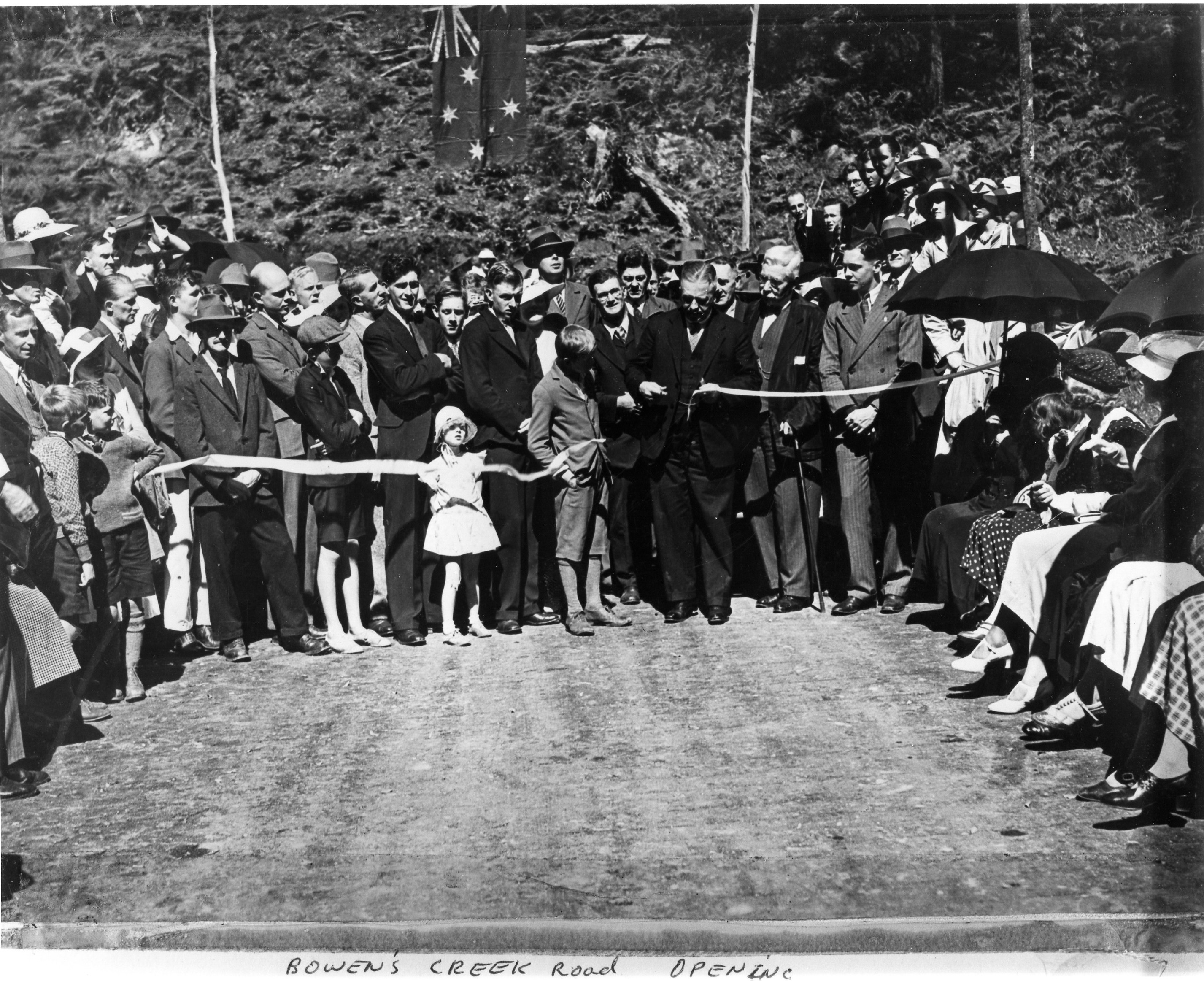
de Groot at the 1935 opening of the Bowens Creek Bridge (middle, with hat)
