= Workers Defence Corps =

Australian Communist paramilitary organisation

- Other name: Lang's Army
- Leaders: Jack Fegan; Dave Williams
- Founded: 1929; 97 years ago
- Dates active: c. 1929–1935
- Dissolved: 1935; 91 years ago
- Country: Australia
- Allegiance: Communist Party of Australia
- Headquarters: Lithgow, New South Wales
- Newspaper: Red Fist
- Active regions: New South Wales
- Ideology: Communism; Marxism–Leninism; Anti-fascism

The Workers Defence Corps (WDC) was an Australian communist paramilitary organisation during the Great Depression.

The WDC was based on similar organisations formed in Britain during the 1926 United Kingdom general strike by the Communist Party of Great Britain for protecting picket lines from police and paramilitaries, which the WDC also undertook. The organisation was first active in 1929 during the Northern Coalfields lockout, where it was used to coerce strikebreakers and defend picket lines from police. The organisation was reformed in 1931 to defend Communist meetings from the growing proto-fascist New Guard.

The WDC is most notable for its clashes with the New Guard, but also engaged in bank robberies and reprisals against police officers, most of which failed. The WDC did have a successful string of weapons thefts. The WDC assisted the Unemployed Workers Movement in opposing evictions.

The WDC saw itself as a Red Army that would eventually lead a nationwide communist revolution.

Members of the WDC were involved in the 'Battle of Bankstown,' in which several hundred New Guardsmen brawled with Bankstown locals, workers, Unemployed Worker's Movement members and WDC members. The New Guard was reportedly defeated, with their vehicles heavily damaged. The riot then continued as the crowd searched Bankstown for New Guardsmen or police officers.

== See also ==
- Socialism in Australia
- Jock Garden
