= Philip Game =

British Army Veteran (1876-1961)

Air Vice-Marshal Sir Philip Game GCB GCVO GBE KCMG DSO
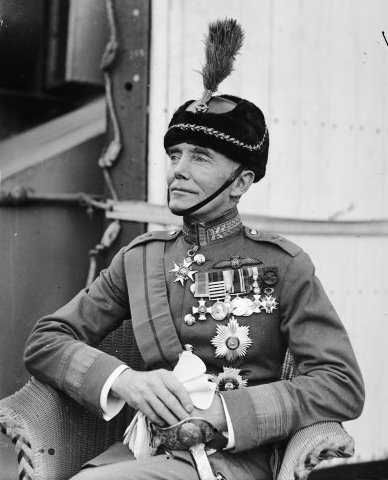
- Sir Philip Game on his arrival in Sydney wearing his 1920 pattern RAF Full Dress uniform, 29 May 1930.

26th Governor of New South Wales
- In office 29 May 1930 – 15 January 1935
- Monarch: George V
- Lieutenant: Sir Philip Street
- Preceded by: Sir Dudley de Chair
- Succeeded by: Sir Alexander Hore-Ruthven

Commissioner of Police of the Metropolis
- In office 1 November 1935 – 1 June 1945
- Monarchs: George V Edward VIII; George VI
- Prime Minister: Stanley Baldwin; Neville Chamberlain; Winston Churchill
- Preceded by: The Lord Trenchard
- Succeeded by: Sir Harold Scott

Personal details
- Born: 20 March 1876 Streatham, Surrey
- Died: 4 February 1961 (aged 84) Sevenoaks, Kent
- Spouse: Gwendolen Hughes-Gibb (m.1908–1961, his death)
- Children: Philip, David, Rosemary

Military service
- Allegiance: United Kingdom
- Branch/service: British Army (1893–1918); Royal Air Force (1918–1929)
- Years of service: 1893–1929
- Rank: Air Vice-Marshal
- Commands: Air Member for Personnel (1923–29); RAF India (1922–1923); South Western Area (1918–1919)
- Battles/wars: Second Boer War; First World War: Battle of Neuve Chapelle
- Awards: Knight Grand Cross of the Order of the Bath; Knight Grand Cross of the Royal Victorian Order; Knight Grand Cross of the Order of the British Empire; Knight Commander of the Order of St Michael and St George; Distinguished Service Order; Mentioned in dispatches (6); Officer of the Order of the Crown of Italy; Officer of the Legion of Honour (France)

Sir Philip Woolcott Game (30 March 1876 – 4 February 1961) was a Royal Air Force commander, who later served as Governor of New South Wales and Commissioner of Police of the Metropolis (London). Born in Surrey in 1876, Game was educated at Charterhouse School and entered the military at Royal Military Academy Woolwich, gaining his commission in 1895. Serving with the Royal Artillery, Game saw action in the Second Boer War and the First World War. After serving with distinction and bravery, Game transferred to the Royal Flying Corps in early 1916 serving as General Trenchard's chief staff officer. Finishing the War as an acting major-general, Game remained in the Royal Air Force after the close of hostilities. Notably he served as Air Officer Commanding RAF India and Air Member for Personnel. He retired from the military in 1929, having reached the rank of air vice-marshal.

In March 1930, Game was appointed Governor of New South Wales, serving during a time of political instability and coming into conflict with the NSW Labor government over attempts to abolish the New South Wales Legislative Council. Game dismissed the Government of Premier Jack Lang in May 1932, forcing the 1932 election. Ending his term in January 1935, Game returned to Britain and was appointed Commissioner of the Metropolitan Police in London. He held it during the tumultuous 1930s, the 1936 abdication crisis and the Second World War, before retiring at the end of the war in Europe in 1945. Between 1937 and 1949 he resided at Langham House, Ham Common, Surrey and was Vicar's Warden at St. Andrews church. Retiring with his wife Gwendoline to his home in Kent, Game died in February 1961, aged 84.

== Early life and career ==
Game was born in Streatham, Surrey, on 30 March 1876 to George Beale Game, a merchant from Broadway, Worcestershire, and his wife Clara Vincent. Before entering the army, he was educated at Charterhouse School. Following officer training at the Royal Military Academy Woolwich, Game was commissioned as a second lieutenant on 2 November 1895 into the Royal Artillery. Promoted to lieutenant on 2 November 1898 and further promoted to captain on 3 June 1901, he served in the Second Boer War and was mentioned in dispatches (including the final despatch by Lord Kitchener dated 23 June 1902). As a young artillery captain he was made officer in charge of the gun carriage bearing the coffin of Queen Victoria at her funeral in February 1901. In July 1902, he was appointed divisional adjutant of the IX division Royal Field Artillery, stationed at Middelburg, Cape Colony. Following brief postings in India and Ireland, Game attended the Staff College, Camberley in 1910 and was posted as a General Service Officer (GSO) at the War Office. He later won the Royal United Services Institute Gold Medal Essay. On 11 August 1908 he married Gwendolen Margaret Hughes-Gibb (1882–1972), the daughter of Francis Hughes-Gibb of Dorset, and was promoted as a major on 15 February 1912.

Following the outbreak of the First World War in 1914, Game served on the front in France, including at the Battle of Neuve Chapelle. In the war he was awarded the Distinguished Service Order, the Legion of Honour and the Order of the Crown of Italy and was five times Mentioned in Despatches. In early 1916 Game transferred to the Royal Flying Corps as a result of Hugh Trenchard's request for an experienced staff officer to serve in his headquarters. Game transferred to the Royal Air Force on its creation in 1918. At the end of the war, Game continued to work under Trenchard, but as Director of Training and Organisation in the RAF. In 1922 he was promoted to the rank of air vice-marshal and appointed Air Officer Commanding RAF India. The next year he took up the post of Air Member for Personnel and was appointed as a Knight Commander of the Order of the Bath (KCB) a year later. Game retired suddenly on 1 January 1929, at the age of 52, allegedly owing to the rumours of his being appointed Chief of the Air Staff. On 1 March 1929 he was appointed a Knight Grand Cross of the Order of the British Empire in the military division (GBE).

== Governor of New South Wales ==
At the height of the Great Depression, Game was appointed Governor of New South Wales in March 1930. He arrived in Sydney with his family aboard the P&O liner, RMS Moldavia on 29 May 1930. On 30 June 1930, Game was appointed by King George V as a Knight of Grace of the Venerable Order of St John (KStJ). At the October 1930 State elections the Bavin Nationalist Government was defeated and the Labor Party leader, Jack Lang, became Premier.

=== Legislative Council abolition ===
Lang's previous term of office from 1925 to 1927 had brought him into conflict with Game's predecessor, Sir Dudley de Chair, over the proposed appointment of additional members to the Legislative Council, in order to enable the abolition of the house, using the same techniques used to abolish the Queensland Legislative Council in 1922. His inability to gain control in the Upper House obstructed Lang's legislative programme and in November 1930, claiming a mandate to abolish the council, Lang's Labor MLCs put forward two bills, one to repeal section 7A of the NSW Constitution (which prevented the abolition of the Council without a referendum), the other to abolish the council. Lang requested the necessary additional appointments to pass the legislation from Game. However, these requests were met with Game's refusal.

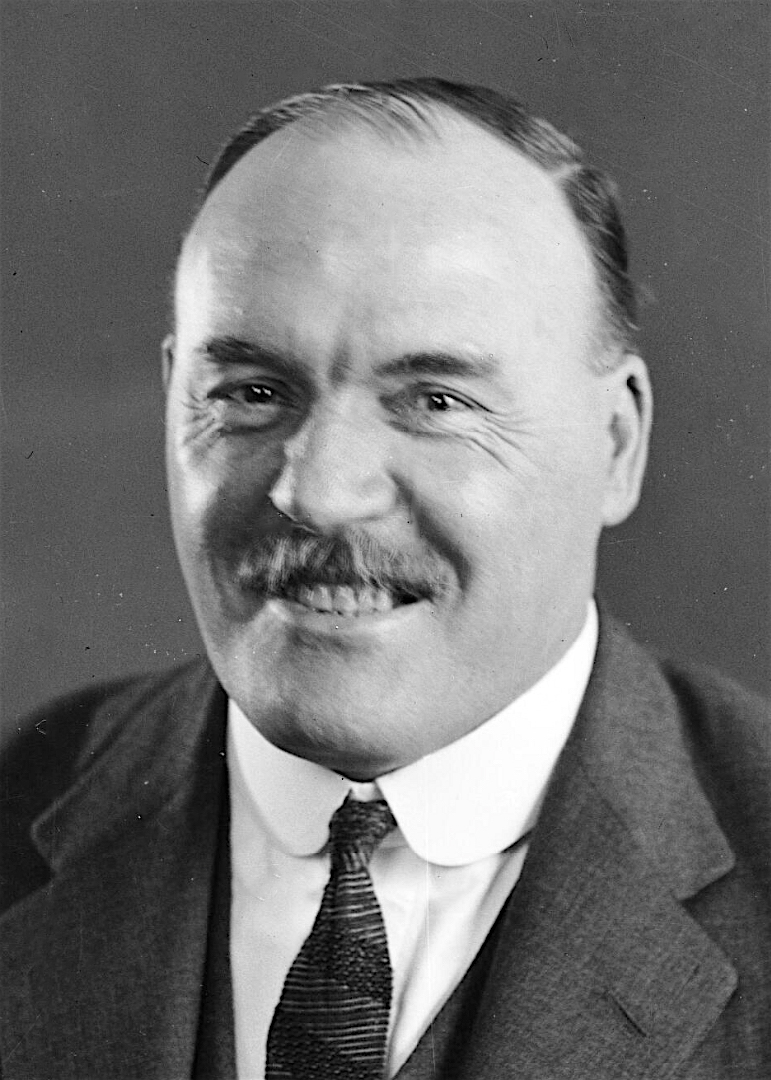
Premier Jack Lang. Throughout the Legislative Council dispute and the events leading to his dismissal, Lang and Game maintained a cordial relationship.

Believing that a referendum was necessary before the bills could become law, the Legislative Council permitted the bills to pass without a division on 10 December. Lang then announced his intention of presenting the bills for Game's Royal assent without a referendum. The following day, two members of the Legislative Council, Thomas Playfair and Arthur Trethowan, applied for and were granted an injunction preventing the president of the council, Sir John Peden, and the ministers from presenting the bills to the Governor without having held a referendum. On 23 December the Supreme Court of New South Wales in the case of Trethowan v Peden, upheld the injunction and ordered the government not to present for royal assent, unless ratified by the electors in a referendum, bills to abolish the council. Lang immediately prepared an appeal to the High Court of Australia. In the case of Attorney-General (New South Wales) v Trethowan, the appeal was rejected by a majority(3-2) of the court. Lang then appealed this decision to the Judicial Committee of the Privy Council in London. On 31 May 1932 the Privy Council dismissed the government's appeal.

Reflecting his status as a representative of the British Government, Game at all times informed the Dominions Office of political developments. In hard financial times, NSW soon came into conflict with the federal government as Lang's unorthodox financial policy opposed the economic orthodoxy advocated by Sir Otto Niemeyer, who was the main financial advisor to the Federal Scullin Labor government and later the Lyons United Australia Party Government. In July 1931, in a personal contribution towards economic recovery, Game notified Treasury to make a 25% deduction from his own monthly salary.

Lang's Government soon introduced legislation to cope with the economic problems the state was facing. Its first move was the Reduction of Interest Bill, which was intended to default on payments of overseas debts to British bondholders in an attempt to negotiate the interest rate. The Legislative Council prevented passage on 26 March 1931 by resolving that the bill be read again in six months time. Lang again asked for additional members to force his legislation through. Game, aware of the weight of opinion in the MacDonald Government in London, the Scullin government in Canberra, and Sydney against the Lang administration's financial policies, refused. On 28 March the Federal Labor Party expelled the New South Wales Labor Party for its opposition to the financial policy of the Federal government. Despite various petitions and demands that he dismiss Lang, Game declined to act. Game later informed the Dominions Secretary, James Henry Thomas, on 29 March 1931 that he was not convinced that Lang would lose an election at this time.

In March and June 1931 Lang repeatedly requested the necessary 80 appointments to swamp the council and prevent obstruction to his legislation. Game again refused, offering 21 appointments, which were enough to pass some of the legislation but not the most controversial bills, including the bill to default on debts. Finally, in a compromise move with Lang, on 19 November 1931 Game assented to 25 appointments, reasoning that it would not be possible to refuse Lang's requests until the Privy Council case was resolved. His telegram to the Dominions Secretary the next day explained further: "I foresee if I refuse now I shall most probably be placed in position before long where...I should not be able to stop at twenty five but should have sooner or later to give sufficient appointments to carry rejected legislation. Such numbers might give Government a permanent majority to carry any and every extreme measure, and extreme factions would probably gain ascendancy owing to what they would represent as my obstinate partiality. Should I refuse appointments until appeal case is heard and should it result in abolition extremists would be in an even stronger position. After reviewing all arguments and considering possibilities I have reached conclusion that my proper and wiser course is to accept advice and have done so."

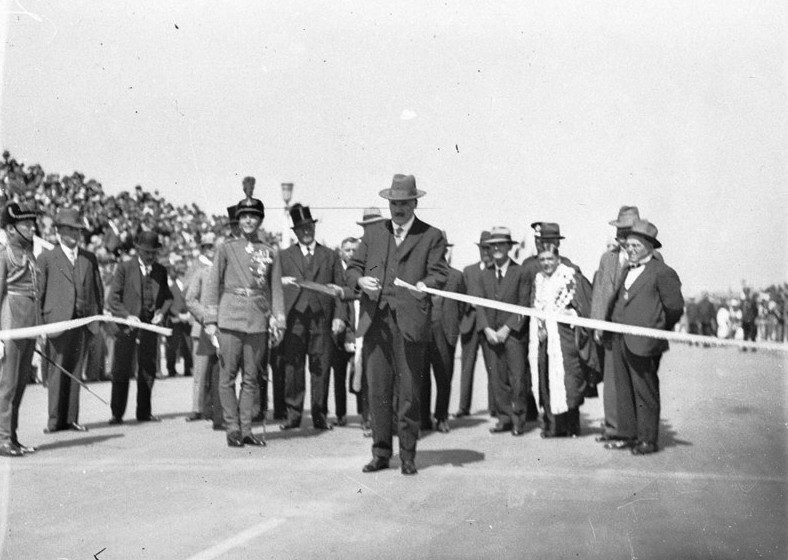
Ribbon ceremony to open the Sydney Harbour Bridge on 19 March 1932. Premier Lang cuts the ribbon while Game looks on.

During this Game questioned the result if Lang won the appeal to the Privy Council and the Legislative Council was abolished. Various correspondence between him and London confirms that had Lang succeeded, Game may have refused assent to the abolition bills, thereby making it the first time it had been withheld since 1708. This potential situation disappeared, however, with the judgment of the Judicial Committee of the Privy Council on 31 May 1932. The judgment dismissed the appeal by the Government of New South Wales. The bills repealing Section 7A and abolishing the Legislative Council could not therefore be presented to the Governor for assent until they had been passed in a referendum. Faced with other problems, Lang's plans for abolition ultimately failed. His successor as Premier, Bertram Stevens, later passed major reforms to replace the appointed Legislative Council, by a Council elected by the whole parliament to terms equivalent to four Assembly terms. This was passed by referendum in 1933.

=== Harbour Bridge opening ===
In March 1932, in anticipation of the opening of the Sydney Harbour Bridge, when Lang decided that he would cut the ribbon and incurred the displeasure of the King, Game reassured the King that Lang had the right to cut the ribbon. Game and his family found much amusement in the controversy thrown up over the matter and the question of whether Game, as governor, should have a 17-gun salute. The far-right New Guard were nevertheless enraged over Lang's decision, culminating in Francis de Groot's cutting of the ribbon just before the scheduled official opening on 19 March 1932. The ribbon was hastily reattached and Lang opened the bridge with Game looking on, and he later gave a speech commemorating the occasion.

=== Dismissal ===
When the United Australia Party Government of Joseph Lyons came to power in January 1932, it passed the Financial Agreement Enforcement Act, thereby forcing the NSW government to adhere to its debt commitments and to cut government spending. Lang appealed the decision to the High Court. When the court ruled that the law was valid, Lang ordered Treasury officials to withdraw all the state's funds from government bank accounts so that the federal government could not gain access to the money. Game advised Lang that in his view this action was illegal. Game added that if Lang did not reverse it, he would dismiss the government in order to obtain ministers who would act lawfully. Lang stood firm, and issued a leaflet in defiance of Game. On 13 May, Game reluctantly decided to exercise his reserve powers and called Lang to Government House to sack him. However, Lang was not the first to hear of his impending dismissal. The pianist Isador Goodman, who had been befriended by Sir Philip and Lady Game, was at Government House for dinner that night. There were a number of interruptions, and Goodman asked if he perhaps ought to leave. Game replied, "No, that's not necessary. You see, I am about to dismiss the Premier."

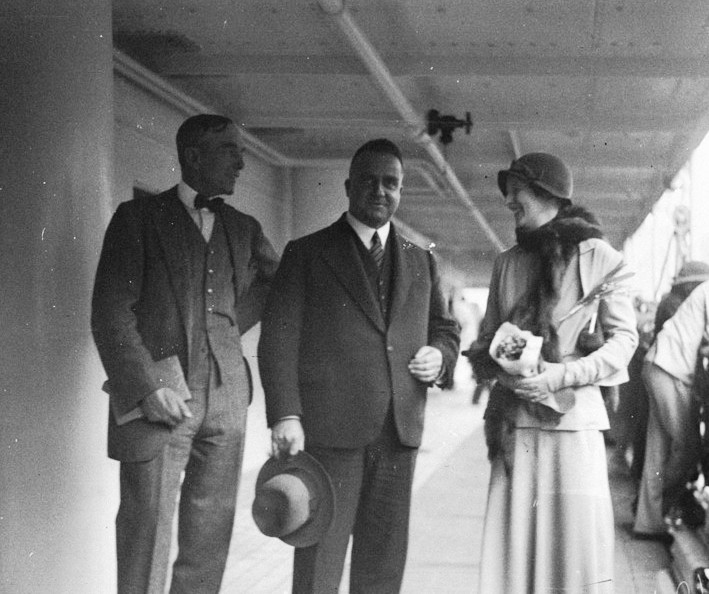
Sir Philip and Lady Game are farewelled by Premier Stevens on board RMS Niagara, upon their departure on 15 January 1935.

Game appointed the Leader of the Opposition, Bertram Stevens of the UAP, as caretaker Premier. Stevens formed a coalition with Michael Bruxner's Country Party and immediately called an election, at which Lang's NSW Labor Party was heavily defeated. This was the first case of an Australian government with the confidence of the lower house of Parliament being dismissed by a vice-regal representative, the second case being when Governor-General Sir John Kerr dismissed Gough Whitlam's government on 11 November 1975. Game himself felt his decision was the right one, despite his personal liking of Lang. He wrote to his mother-in-law on 2 July 1932: "Still with all his faults of omission and commission I had and still have a personal liking for Lang and a great deal of sympathy for his ideals and I did not at all relish being forced to dismiss him. But I felt faced with the alternative of doing so or reducing the job of Governor all over the Empire to a farce." Lang himself, despite objecting to his dismissal, conceded that he too liked Game, regarding him as fair and polite, and having had good relations with him.

=== End of term ===
During his governorship Game was the patron of several organisations including the District and Bush Nursing Associations and the Royal Agricultural Society of New South Wales, and was Chief Scout of the NSW Boy Scouts Association. Lady Game was President of the District and Bush Nursing Associations and the Girl Guides Association. The rest of his term was fairly uneventful, and he returned to Britain following the expiration of his term on 15 January 1935. Before he left Sydney he was appointed a Knight Commander of the Order of St Michael and St George (KCMG), on the recommendation of Premier Stevens, for his service as governor. In honour of their service to the state, in 1933 Ku-ring-gai Municipal Council named a major road in Lindfield as Lady Game Drive, and a nearby park as Sir Phillip Game Reserve. In memory of Game's time as governor, a portrait was commissioned by public subscription and painted by R.G. Eves. It was then displayed at the National Art Gallery of New South Wales before being presented to Government House.

== Metropolitan Police Commissioner ==
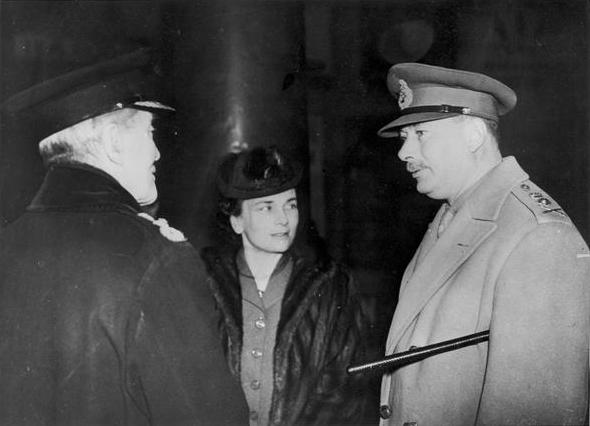
Commissioner Game (left) with the Duke and Duchess of Gloucester at Euston Station on the eve of their departure for Australia in 1945.

Upon his return to Britain, Game served as Metropolitan Police Commissioner from November 1935 until 1945, the last senior armed forces officer to be appointed to that post (with the exception of his immediate successor, a senior civil servant, all successive commissioners have been career police officers). Not long after his appointment Game was responsible for policing the funeral of King George V and the 1937 Coronation of George VI and Elizabeth. For his work in the 1937 coronation, Game was appointed by King George VI a Knight Grand Cross of the Royal Victorian Order (GCVO) on 11 May 1937. His time in the post also saw the experimental introduction of patrol dogs at Peckham in 1938.

Serving as Commissioner during very tumultuous times, Game had to deal with Fascist and Communist demonstrations, a bombing campaign waged by the Irish Republican Army and, during the Second World War, the organisation of the police role in air-raid precautions and relief. He dealt effectively with those problems and the consequent improvement in police morale was an important factor in the survival of London during the concentrated German air attack of 1940–41. In 1943, in an attempt to prevent burglaries, Game urged householders not to keep furs, adapting a verse from Chapter 9 of Ecclesiastes saying, "they are no doubt warmer, and look nicer than a tweed coat, but a live dog is better than a dead lion."

Towards the end of his time as Metropolitan Police Commissioner, Game worked to establish a boys' club. The Sir Philip Game Boys' Club, situated in Croydon, was opened in 1946. The club was officially opened on 19 July 1947 in Game's presence by the then Home Secretary, James Chuter Ede. On 2 May 1945 Game was appointed a Knight Grand Cross (GCB) in the Civil Division of the Order of the Bath (he was already a Knight Commander in the Military Division of the same Order); and he retired soon after on 1 June 1945.

He died at his home, Blakenhall, Sevenoaks, Kent, on 4 February 1961, survived by his wife, daughter, and by his elder son, Philip Malcolm Game, who in 1939 had married Vera Blackburn, an Australian artist and the daughter of Sir Charles Blackburn. His second son David, a lieutenant of the Royal Naval Volunteer Reserve, had been killed in 1943 at age 29, while on active service at Taranto, Italy. His daughter Rosemary recalled her childhood and her father's work in her 1989 memoir, Growing Up at Government House. New premises for the Boys' Club named after him were completed in 1964 and officially opened on 8 May 1966 by the then Home Secretary, Sir Frank Soskice, in the presence of Game's widow, who unveiled a plaque in memory of her husband.

== Honours ==
Viceregal styles of Sir Philip Game
- Reference style: His Excellency
- Spoken style: Your Excellency

Knight Grand Cross of the Order of the Bath (GCB)	1945
Knight Commander of the Order of the Bath (KCB)	1924
Companion of the Order of the Bath (CB)	1919
Knight Grand Cross of the Royal Victorian Order (GCVO)	1937
Knight Grand Cross of the Order of the British Empire (GBE)	1929
Knight Commander of the Order of St Michael and St George (KCMG)	1935
Companion of the Distinguished Service Order (DSO)	1915
Knight of Grace of the Venerable Order of St John of Jerusalem (KStJ)	1929
Queen's South Africa Medal	
1914–15 Star	
British War Medal	
Victory Medal with palm for Mentioned in dispatches	
King George V Silver Jubilee Medal	1935
King George VI Coronation Medal	1937
Queen Elizabeth II Coronation Medal	1953
Officer of the Order of the Crown of Italy	1917
Officer of the Legion of Honour	1917
Grand Officer of the Order of Orange-Nassau	1947

=== Honorific eponyms ===
- Governor Game Lookout, Royal National Park (1932).
- Sir Phillip Game Reserve and Lady Game Drive, Lindfield (1933).

Military offices
Preceded by Robert Brooke-Popham	Chief of Staff, Royal Flying Corps in the Field; RAF in the Field from 1 April 1918; March 1916 – October 1918	Succeeded by Kenneth Wigram
Preceded by Mark Kerr	General Officer Commanding South-Western Area; 1918–1919	Succeeded by Charles Longcroft
Preceded by Tom Webb-Bowen	Air Officer Commanding RAF India; 1922–1923	Succeeded by Edward Ellington
Preceded by Sir Oliver Swann	Air Member for Personnel; 1923–1929	Succeeded by Sir John Salmond
Government offices
Preceded by Sir Dudley de Chair	Governor of New South Wales; 1930–1935	Succeeded by Sir Alexander Hore-Ruthven
Police appointments
Preceded by The Lord Trenchard	Commissioner of Police of the Metropolis; 1935–1945	Succeeded by Sir Harold Scott
