= New Guard =

Australian fascist paramilitary organisation

- Leader: Eric Campbell
- Founded: 16 March 1931; 95 years ago
- Dates active: c. 1931–1935
- Dissolved: 1935; 91 years ago
- Split from: Old Guard
- Country: Australia
- Headquarters: Sydney, New South Wales
- Active regions: New South Wales
- Ideology: Fascism; • Militarism; • Monarchism; • Anti-socialism; • Anti-communism; • Christian fascism; • Fascist corporatism; • Australian nationalism
- Political position: Far-right
- Size: c. 50,000 (1931) c. 80,000 (1932) c. 1,500 (1933)

The New Guard was an Australian fascist paramilitary organisation during the Great Depression. It was the largest and most successful fascist organisation in Australian history.

The New Guard, known for its violent agitation against NSW Premier Jack Lang, was founded and led by Eric Campbell. At its peak, membership was estimated to be around 50,000. The group's membership was predominantly made up of Anglo-Protestant, monarchist and anti-communist elements.

The organisation attracted great publicity when member Captain Francis de Groot, on horseback and at Campbell's direction, upstaged Lang in cutting the ribbon at the opening ceremony of the Sydney Harbour Bridge in protest at the latter's anti-monarchist ideology.

After Lang's dismissal in 1932, the New Guard's membership declined rapidly. Campbell met with fascists and National Socialists such as Sir Oswald Mosley and Joachim von Ribbentrop and, in 1934, published his manifesto The New Road, signalling an ideological transition towards Italian corporate statism. As the Centre Party, it unsuccessfully contested five seats at the 1935 New South Wales state election. The party failed to win a single seat, polling 0.60 per cent of the vote. Following the election, Campbell withdrew from public life. Both the party and the New Guard disbanded shortly afterwards.

== History ==
=== Old Guard ===
In response to the election of Jack Lang as Premier of New South Wales, and rising pressure from trade unionists, counter-movements began to rise in opposition to the Labor Party. Among them was the Old Guard, a secret organisation purported to exist as early as 1917, which at the time of the Great Depression was administrated primarily by businessmen Roger Goldfinch and Robert Gillespie, among other anonymous committee members. The Old Guard was a coalition of imperial loyalists, devoted to the British Empire and ready to act preemptively to prevent a socialist revolution from taking place. At the height of its popularity the organisation enjoyed close ties with the NSW Police Force, Attorney-General's Department and the Department of Defence, and boasted 30,000 members comprising strongly of rural New South Welshmen and wealthy Protestant Anglo-Saxons.

=== Old-New Guard schism ===
Among the Old Guard's members was World War I veteran Eric Campbell, an army officer and former gunner with the First Australian Imperial Force. Campbell had been introduced to the Old Guard by John Scott, a fellow member of the board of Sydney insurance company Sun Insurance.

Over time, Campbell grew discontented with the Old Guard. The organisation was sworn to absolute secrecy of membership, and was divided into cells as to conceal the identity of its leadership. Campbell disagreed with this arrangement, asserting that the uncommunicative nature of its leadership to its members, mostly returned servicemen, was ill-fitting to their nature as soldiers. He believed that without clear authority and direction, the Old Guard would be unable to retain members. Unable to convince the committee to change its administrative strategy, he and John Scott left the Old Guard. A week after Campbell's resignation, he and others from the Old Guard agreed, in mid-February, to form a separate body which would be diametrically opposed to the Old Guard's secrecy and what they considered its inaction.

The New Guard was officially formed on 16 March 1931, built on a common ideological system of monarchism, classic liberalism and anti-communism. Campbell was voted Chief Commander. Within a few weeks its membership had swelled.

=== Anti-leftist action (1931-32) ===
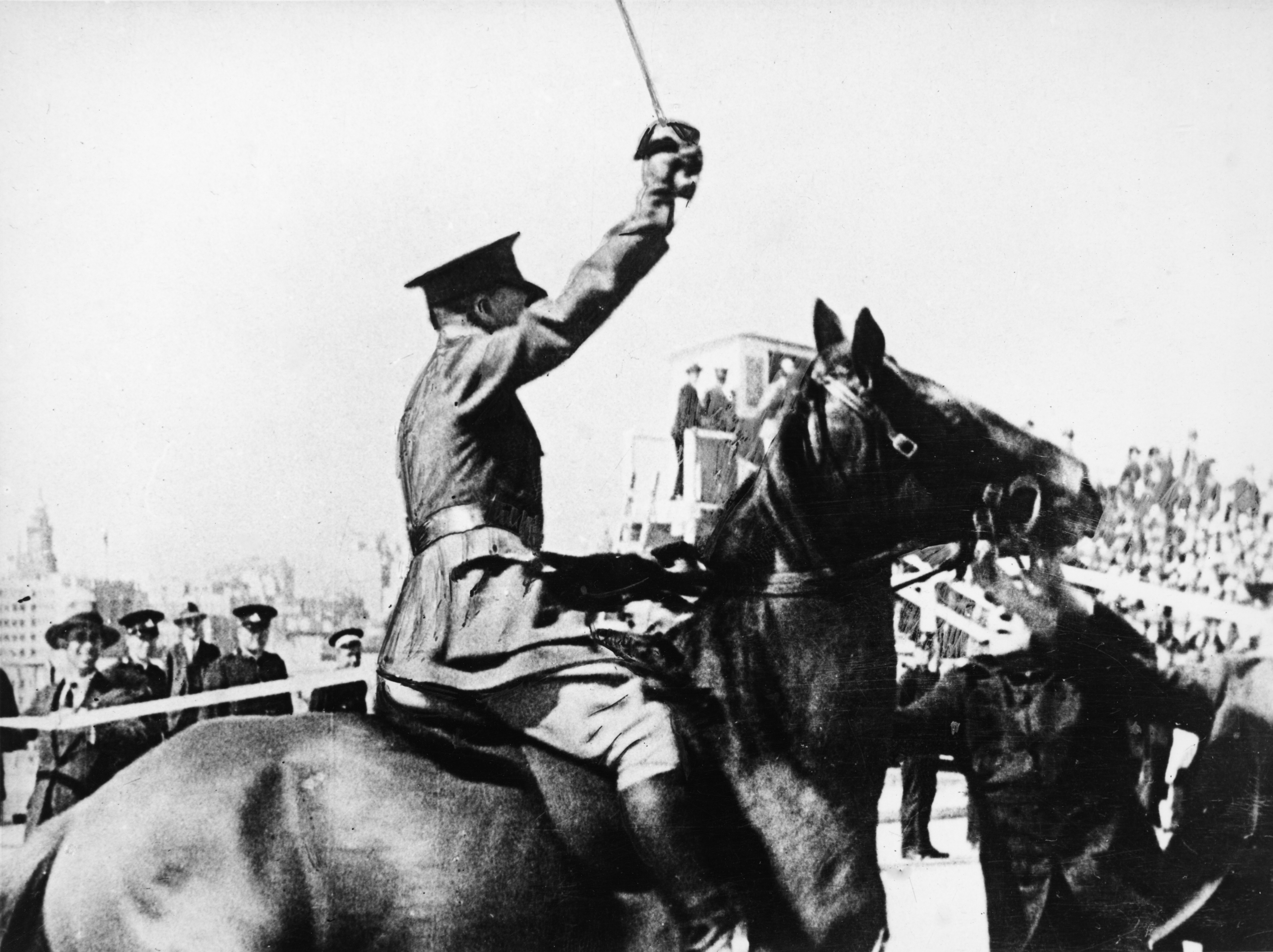
Captain de Groot declares the Sydney Harbour Bridge open in March 1932.

The New Guard was a paramilitary group, its military capability was extremely limited and vastly overstated by its leadership. It was amateurish, ineffectual and likened to the Keystone Cops. During the initial growth of the movement, Campbell was able to attract many ex-soldiers and ex-commanders to the movement, with ex-military making up the majority of the group's membership, including the likes of early aviator Charles Kingsford Smith and North Sydney Mayor Hubert Primrose. As general commanding officer, Campbell organised it on military lines. He claimed that, in an 'emergency', it could maintain essential services including Bunnerong power house and the police attested to the Guard's efficiency. With a peak membership of over 50,000, the Guard rallied in public, broke up 'Communist' meetings, drilled, vilified the Labor Party and demanded the deportation of Communists. Campbell and his New Guard proceeded to secure connections and weapons so that, in the event of a statewide communist revolt in which the police had become ineffective, he could seize control of essential services and keep them operational. An attempt to clothe its members in uniforms failed, however, when the Guard could not go through with its order for lack of funds. Campbell's naïve offer to step in to break a seamen's strike in October 1931 was rebuffed by shipowners.

==== Violent clashes ====
Assisted by motorcar, the New Guard developed a strategy of regularly disrupting left-wing workers' meetings, spending much of the 1932 summer doing so. During December 1931, Captain Francis de Groot organised around 1,000 New Guardsmen to attack leftist meetings. On 11 December 1931, three policemen were injured in a fight between New Guardsmen and communists in Darlinghurst. On 13 February 1932, 700 New Guardsmen practised military drills in Belmore and a number of journalists who attempted to document the drills were assaulted. A few days later, 13 members of the New Guard were arrested after violently disrupting a political meeting in Coffs Harbour. Violent attacks on leftist meetings continued for weeks as part of a 'general mobilisation'.

De Groot had stated that he 'felt that, the best reply to force, was greater force' and by May 1932 Campbell had started inciting street brawls, and came close to staging a coup d'état against the Lang government. Against this backdrop, the state Labor party formed a number of militias including the Workers' Defence Army (WDA), the Labor Defence Corps (LDC) and the Australian Labor Army (ALA), formed by Lang's supporters. Street fights between Lang's Labor Army and fascist paramilitary groups, including Sir Thomas Blamey's Victorian-based "White Army, also known as the League of National Security, and the New Guard became increasingly common as the New Guard attempted to discredit the left by starting brawls or other breaches of the peace.

Though the New Guard sought to work as a supplement to the police in the event of a socialist revolution, they were significantly opposed under orders from the Lang government. Of particular use to Lang in opposing the New Guard was William John MacKay, who was appointed Acting Metropolitan Superintendent following the 'Battle of Bankstown' on 26 February 1932. Following MacKay's commencement of a campaign of surveillance and legal persecution, the New Guard attempted to measure the strength of the Sydney police force by organising many small unapproved street meetings across the city in an attempt to stretch their men thin. When forced to disperse by police, each group of New Guardsmen would peacefully disperse and simply reform nearby. According to a contact Campbell had in the NSW Police Force, the police were reporting large street gatherings and were requesting reinforcements from all over the city.

==== Opening of the Sydney Harbour Bridge ====
On 19 March 1932, the New Guard interrupted the much-anticipated opening of the Sydney Harbour Bridge. The New Guard had wanted to have Sir Philip Game open the bridge on behalf of King George V, but Lang refused, stating that "I will open it myself, it'll be cheaper". The New Guard declared that Lang would not perform the ceremony, with Campbell calling Lang a 'tyrant and scoundrel' and declaring that Lang would never open the Harbour Bridge. Rumours began to circulate of a plot to kidnap Lang.

During the opening ceremony, army officer and zone commander Francis de Groot upstaged Jack Lang by slashing the ceremonial ribbon with his sword. De Groot was supplied with a horse by fellow New Guardsmen Albert Reichard and he rode to the ceremony in his World War I 15th Hussars uniform, managing to slash the ribbon before Lang. De Groot was pulled from his horse and detained, later being fined £9 (equivalent to $859.99 in 2017). The Mayor of North Sydney, Hubert Primrose, an official participant at the opening ceremony, was also a member of the New Guard.

==== Assault on Jock Garden ====
On 6 May 1932, Trades and Labour Council secretary John (Jock) Garden, an influential member of Lang's inner circle, was assaulted by members a New Guard faction known as the Fascist Legion. Garden was assaulted at his home by eight hooded men in Ku Klux Klan-like gowns. The incident caused massive resignations from the New Guard.

=== Decline ===
==== 1932 constitutional crisis ====
On 13 May 1932, Lang was dismissed from his premiership. Along with an inner faction of the New Guard's involvement in orchestrating the assault upon of Communist Party of Australia founder Jock Garden, the New Guard began to lose popularity as the organisation's purpose was perceived as having been fulfilled. The activities of militant splinter groups emerging from the New Guard, such as the Fascist Legion, also contributed to a rush of resignations which began even before Lang's dismissal.

By mid-1932, the New Guard was largely a spent force. With their main objective complete – the removal of Lang from office – the New Guard continued to lose members as it drifted into the mid-1930s. Even de Groot left the organisation in November 1932, pursuing collaboration with the Melbourne-based League of National Security by which the White Army was also known. It was during this time that Campbell began to outline more fully his political beliefs, producing a series of broadcasts in which he developed a "complete credo for a fascist State", most notably incorporating a "non-elective cabinet or commission, a corporative assembly, vocational franchise and a charter of liberty". He also stated his intentions to contest the next state election, a date for which had not yet been set.

==== 1933: Exploration into fascism ====
Campbell's memoirs state that due to the New Guard's opposition to party politics and unwillingness to align themselves with either side, they were often dubbed "fascists". Though the New Guard bore resemblance to the militant Blackshirts in Italy, its strong adherence to individualism found it disqualified it from this definition. Campbell was curious to learn about fascism from the source however, so in 1933 during an overseas business trip, he met with Sir Oswald Mosley and wife Lady Cynthia at their London home to discuss the matter. His experience was overall positive, and while unimpressed with the members of Mosley's British Union of Fascists, he was reminded of his own New Guardmen when he attended an Imperial Fascist League meeting.

With Mosley's recommendations he later progressed to Berlin where, unable to meet Chancellor of Germany Adolf Hitler, he was able to see Foreign Affairs Minister Joachim von Ribbentrop, as well as Alfred Rosenberg. In Rome he was likewise unable to see Mussolini, instead meeting with Secretary Achille Starace, though their mutual unintelligibility and failure to use French as a medium was no use. Nevertheless, Campbell's tour across the fascist powers of Europe left him deeply impressed with the ideology. However, on his return to Australia, Campbell's support for an "openly pro-fascist policy" was met with strong opposition from the Guard's "anti-fascist moderates". These attempts to establish the movement as what historian Keith Amos dubs "Australia's first fascist party" are thought to hastened the decline of the New Guard, with many previous members unhappy with the ideological progression that had taken place. One year later he would pen his manifesto The New Road which put forward his case for an Australian application of Italian corporate statism.

==== 1935 state election ====
One idea expressed in Campbell's manifesto was that the emergence of a "centre party" in Australia was inevitable. While initially satisfied by the prospects of a United Australia Party-led purging of communism and other socialistic and anti-communist dogmas from the continent, Campbell had realised that the central tenets of the New Guard could not be fulfilled due to those politicians' ineffectiveness in bringing them about. Becoming fully dissatisfied with the politics that had, in his words, "degenerated into a number of sordid business undertakings", the New Guard entered into party politics.

The Centre Party was officially established in December 1933 at a meeting of over 1,000 people, with The Sydney Morning Herald reporting that 100 branches of the party would be established. The majority of the shrinking organisation endorsed its move into electoral politics, which was, according to Campbell, "necessitated by the failure of the UAP governments, at both federal and state levels, to accede to the New Guard's demands". Due to a lack of time needed to organise the campaign, the party did not contest the September 1934 federal election. An August 1934 meeting of the New Guard reaffirmed Campbell as leader, and resolved to "make itself felt in the next State elections".

At the May 1935 New South Wales state election, the Centre Party contested five out of the 90 Legislative Assembly districts, all in suburban Sydney, and polled 0.60 percent of the total vote. In two seats, Hornsby, contested by Fergus Munro, and Lane Cove, contested by Campbell, only the Centre Party and the United Australia Party fielded candidates, with the former polling over 15 percent of the vote in both seats. In the other seats it contested, the Centre Party candidates failed to poll more than 5 percent of the vote. The party's relatively high vote in Hornsby and Lane Cove is thought to have represented "merely the level of protest against [UAP Premier] Stevens" in the absence of other candidates.

In Arncliffe, the only seat that required a preference distribution, the majority (56.78%) of Centre Party preferences flowed to the United Australia candidate, Horace Harper, who was defeated by Labor's Joseph Cahill, a future premier. Enoch Jones, the candidate for Arncliffe, later served as a City of Rockdale councillor, and contested the seat of Rockdale for the Liberal Democrats at the 1944 state election. Additionally, Aubrey Murphy, the candidate in Concord, served on two occasions as mayor of the Blue Mountains City Council in the 1950s, and was named an MBE in the 1960 New Year Honours.

With the exception of occasional speaking engagements, Campbell largely withdrew from public life following the election, and spent most of the rest of his life in country New South Wales, where he was president of the Burrangong Shire Council in 1949 and 1950 (now part of Young Shire). Campbell's 1965 autobiographical account of his involvement in the New Guard, The Rallying Point, considered "confused", "highly unreliable" and a work of "historical fiction" by Moore in any event, does not mention the Centre Party at all. Later writers have suggested that the party's lack of success at the 1935 election represented "an electoral brick-wall", with the party overall a "failure" and Campbell's movement having "lost most of its drive".

== Organisation ==
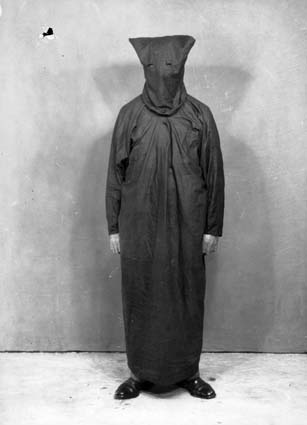
The costume of a New Guard member, obtained from a defendant in the Garden case.

At its inception, the administrative structure of the New Guard consisted of an Organising Committee led by a chairman with powers to add more committee members by way of a unanimous vote. This committee would be tasked with the recruitment of members and their separation by localities across the Sydney and regional New South Wales areas. Following the meeting at Cahill's, the structure of the organisation was revised in an attempt to exercise "practical democracy". The power allotted to each position in the New Guard changed as the organisation was built.

The area of Greater Sydney would be broken down into four independent Zones: A Zone, consisting of the land north of Sydney Harbour; B Zone, covering the Eastern Suburbs as well as from the coastline down to Maroubra; C Zone, incorporating the Southern Suburbs down to and including the Sutherland Shire; and D Zone, including the Western Suburbs to the west of Parramatta. These Zones would be divided into Divisions and then subdivided into Localities. As part of Campbell's practical democratic solution, each Locality would operate as independent units where a few hundred New Guardsmen would select for themselves a Locality Commanders and Administrator to handle affairs, and each Locality would frequently meet at Locality Conventions to discuss and vote on matters. The Locality Commanders of each Division would select Divisional Commanders, and said Divisional Commanders would meet to pick the Zone Commander for their respective Zone. Divisional and Zone Commanders would only assume active command positions when more than one of their respective subdivisions were active in a particular objective, therefore making Localities especially independent in the operation of the New Guard.

The executive branch of the New Guard was the General Council, consisting of the leading Chief Commander and four Zone Commanders with equal voting power. The General Council was only to make decisions regarding major executive matters, and questions regarding routine and defensive emergencies would be directed to the Chief Commander, or Deputy Chief Commander if the former was absent. During the period of structural preparation the Chief Commander was to not interfere in the movement's formation, and only assume complete executive involvement once the Locality system was completely established. To put checks on the General Council's power, Campbell formed the Council of Action, consisting of the Chief Commander and Divisional Commanders; the Chief Commander would be deprived of a vote.

Intelligence on the New Guard's political rivals would be collected by the individual Localities and submitted to the Chief of the Intelligence Branch for collation. While being essential to the New Guard's functionality, it was sometimes inaccurate in its intelligence gathering; flawed analysis of the political demographics of Sydney claimed that there were 252,473 Communists in ten Sydney electorates alone.

As Campbell allowed considerable independence for the Localities and permitted members to associate freely with any political party so long that the New Guard's central values were upheld, splinter groups such as the Fascist Legion (also known as the Pack of Cards) formed. Legion members wore Ku Klux Klan-style gowns and hoods at their own internal meetings in order to guarantee anonymity, adopting pseudonyms based on particular playing cards in a standard 52-card deck (excluding queens). Keeping with the theme of playing cards, the Fascist Legion's leader was led by "the Joker". Its membership was estimated at 49. Besides investigating disloyalty and laxity within the New Guard, they purportedly engaged in targeted operations such as the aforementioned attack on Jock Garden. They were reported to be planning kidnappings and police arm store raids. The activity of splinter groups such as the Fascist Legion contributed to the bleeding of members in the lead-up to Lang's dismissal by Sir Philip Game.

== Membership ==
Standards for New Guard membership had prospective members picked irrespective of class, financial situation or party affiliations, so long as they were of good character. For maximal utility, the membership system was split into three groups:

- A class - Members who were physically able, and could be employed for operations both within Localities and outside its boundaries if needed
- B class - Members with technical qualifications, regardless of age, who could assist in the maintenance of essential services such as water, electricity and transport services, among others, in the event of a socialist revolution
- C class - Members that due to their age or personality could only be trusted to handle operations within their own Locality

New Guardsmen of their own Locality were encouraged to participate during Locality Conventions to decide matters specific to their area. A member was not kept within the organisation against their will, as they could leave at any time for any reason. This was to ensure that the New Guard could preserve its democratic, voluntary elements established at its founding.

Estimates of the New Guard's membership count are contradictory. A report conducted by the NSW Police in September 1931 found 87,000 had sought membership and by December of the same year there were 39,000 card-carrying members – with 3,000 residing in the country centres of regional NSW. For practical reasons, Campbell's internal estimations of membership count focused on those that the New Guard could rely on in the event of a socialist revolution. In that he estimated the figure at 20,000. For propaganda reasons, the New Guard's membership was often publicly exaggerated, as when Campbell foreshadowed a procession of 100,000 men along Macquarie Street to present a petition to Sir Game.

=== Notable members ===
- Hubert Primrose, former Mayor of North Sydney
- Charles Kingsford Smith and Charles Ulm, early Australian aviators
- Francis de Groot, interloper at opening of the Sydney Harbour Bridge
- Tom Walsh, former trade unionist and husband of suffragette Adela Pankhurst
- Herbert Lloyd, Major General of the Australian Army
- Julian Howard Ashton, prominent journalist and writer

== See also ==
- Australian nationalism
- Australia First Movement
- Far-right politics in Australia
- Loyalism
- Opposition to trade unions
